= Communauté de communes du Val de Noye =

Coordinates: 49.7545°N 2.3629°E

Val de Noye
- Former communauté de communes
- Interactive map of Val de Noye
- Country: France
- Region: Hauts-de-France
- Department: Somme
- No. of communes: {{{nbcomm}}}
- Established: 2001
- Disbanded: 2017
- Population (1999): 8,772

The Communauté de communes du Val de Noye is a former communauté de communes in the Somme département and in the Picardie région of France. It was created in May 2001. It was merged into the new Communauté de communes Avre Luce Noye in January 2017.

== Composition ==
This communauté de communes comprised 26 communes:

1. Ailly-sur-Noye
2. Aubvillers
3. Chaussoy-Epagny
4. Chirmont
5. Cottenchy
6. Coullemelle
7. Dommartin
8. Esclainvillers
9. La Faloise
10. Flers-sur-Noye
11. Folleville
12. Fouencamps
13. Fransures
14. Grivesnes
15. Guyencourt-sur-Noye
16. Hallivillers
17. Jumel
18. Lawarde-Mauger-l'Hortoy
19. Louvrechy
20. Mailly-Raineval
21. Quiry-le-Sec
22. Rogy
23. Rouvrel
24. Sauvillers-Mongival
25. Sourdon
26. Thory

== See also ==
- Communes of the Somme department
