= Flers =

Flers may refer to several communes in France:

- Flers, Orne
- Flers, Pas-de-Calais
- Flers, Somme
- Flers-en-Escrebieux, Nord
- Flers-lez-Lille, Nord; now part of Villeneuve d'Ascq
- Flers-sur-Noye, Somme
