= Arrondissement of Montdidier =

Coordinates: 49.65°N 2.57°E

Montdidier
- Arrondissement
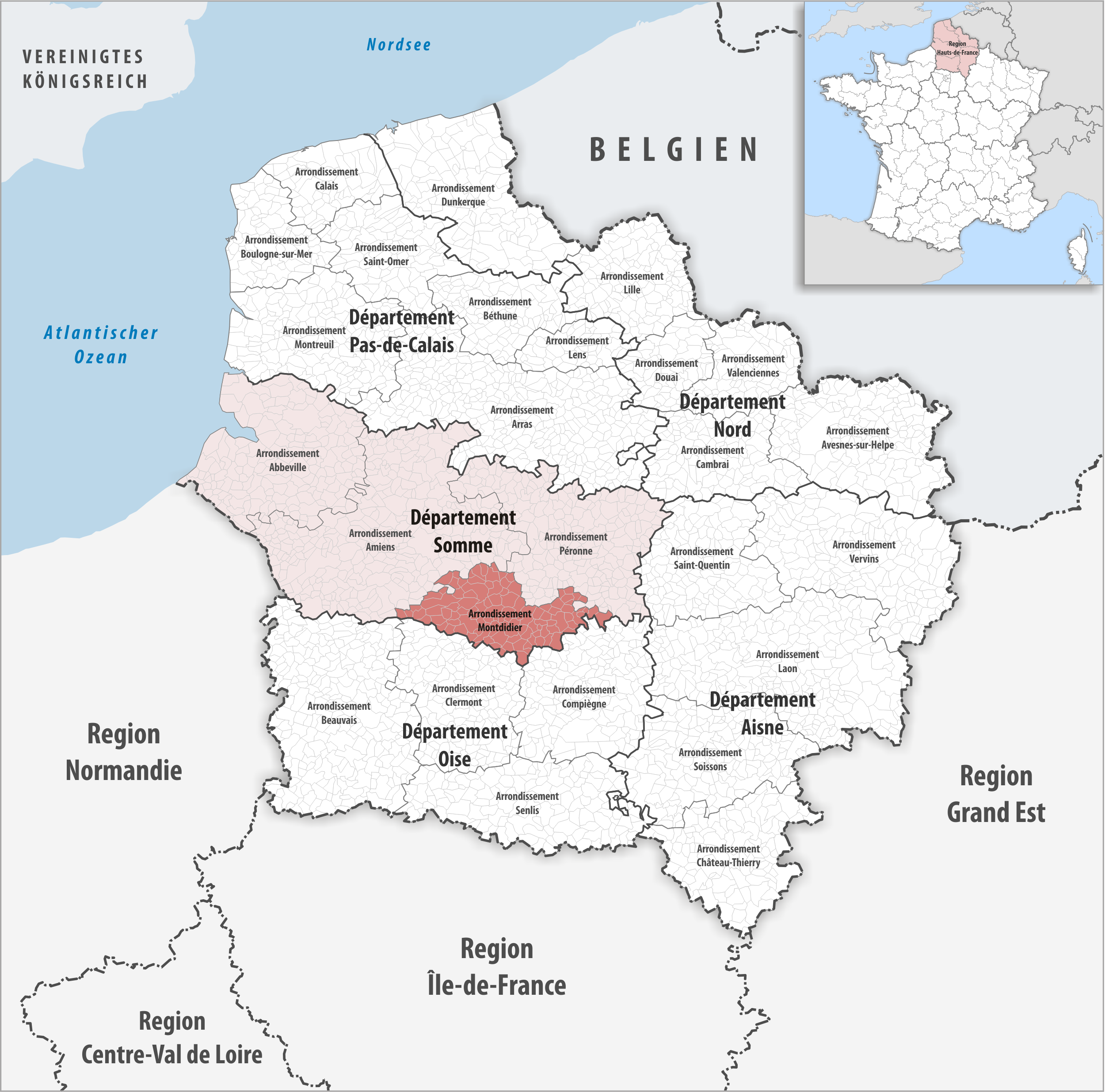
- Location within the region Hauts-de-France
- Country: France
- Region: Hauts-de-France
- Department: Somme
- No. of communes: {{{nbcomm}}}
- Area: 781.9 km^{2} (301.9 sq mi)
- Population (2023): 46,658
  - Density: 59.67/km^{2} (154.6/sq mi)
- INSEE code: 803

The arrondissement of Montdidier is an arrondissement of France in the Somme department in the Hauts-de-France region. It has 109 communes. Its population is 46,920 (2021), and its area is 781.9 km^{2} (301.9 sq mi).

== Composition ==
The communes of the arrondissement of Montdidier, and their INSEE codes, are:

1. Ailly-sur-Noye (80010)
2. Andechy (80023)
3. Armancourt (80027)
4. Arvillers (80031)
5. Assainvillers (80032)
6. Aubercourt (80035)
7. Aubvillers (80037)
8. Ayencourt (80049)
9. Balâtre (80053)
10. Beaucourt-en-Santerre (80064)
11. Becquigny (80074)
12. Berteaucourt-lès-Thennes (80094)
13. Beuvraignes (80101)
14. Biarre (80103)
15. Bouillancourt-la-Bataille (80121)
16. Boussicourt (80125)
17. Braches (80132)
18. Bus-la-Mésière (80152)
19. Cantigny (80170)
20. Le Cardonnois (80174)
21. Carrépuis (80176)
22. Cayeux-en-Santerre (80181)
23. Champien (80185)
24. Chaussoy-Epagny (80188)
25. Chirmont (80193)
26. Cottenchy (80213)
27. Coullemelle (80214)
28. Courtemanche (80220)
29. Crémery (80223)
30. Cressy-Omencourt (80224)
31. Damery (80232)
32. Dancourt-Popincourt (80233)
33. Davenescourt (80236)
34. Démuin (80237)
35. Domart-sur-la-Luce (80242)
36. Dommartin (80246)
37. L'Échelle-Saint-Aurin (80263)
38. Erches (80278)
39. Ercheu (80279)
40. Esclainvillers (80283)
41. Étalon (80292)
42. Ételfay (80293)
43. La Faloise (80299)
44. Faverolles (80302)
45. Fescamps (80306)
46. Fignières (80311)
47. Flers-sur-Noye (80315)
48. Folleville (80321)
49. Fonches-Fonchette (80322)
50. Fontaine-sous-Montdidier (80326)
51. Fouencamps (80337)
52. Fransures (80349)
53. Fresnoy-en-Chaussée (80358)
54. Fresnoy-lès-Roye (80359)
55. Goyencourt (80383)
56. Gratibus (80386)
57. Grivesnes (80390)
58. Grivillers (80391)
59. Gruny (80393)
60. Guerbigny (80395)
61. Guyencourt-sur-Noye (80403)
62. Hailles (80405)
63. Hallivillers (80407)
64. Hangard (80414)
65. Hangest-en-Santerre (80415)
66. Hattencourt (80421)
67. Herly (80433)
68. Ignaucourt (80449)
69. Jumel (80452)
70. Laboissière-en-Santerre (80453)
71. Laucourt (80467)
72. Lawarde-Mauger-l'Hortoy (80469)
73. Liancourt-Fosse (80473)
74. Lignières (80478)
75. Louvrechy (80494)
76. Mailly-Raineval (80499)
77. Malpart (80504)
78. Marché-Allouarde (80508)
79. Marestmontiers (80511)
80. Marquivillers (80517)
81. Mesnil-Saint-Georges (80541)
82. Mézières-en-Santerre (80545)
83. Montdidier (80561)
84. Moreuil (80570)
85. Morisel (80571)
86. La Neuville-Sire-Bernard (80595)
87. Piennes-Onvillers (80623)
88. Le Plessier-Rozainvillers (80628)
89. Le Quesnel (80652)
90. Quiry-le-Sec (80657)
91. Remaugies (80667)
92. Rogy (80675)
93. Roiglise (80676)
94. Rollot (80678)
95. Rouvrel (80681)
96. Roye (80685)
97. Rubescourt (80687)
98. Saint-Mard (80708)
99. Sauvillers-Mongival (80729)
100. Sourdon (80740)
101. Thennes (80751)
102. Thory (80758)
103. Tilloloy (80759)
104. Trois-Rivières (80625)
105. Verpillières (80790)
106. Villers-aux-Érables (80797)
107. Villers-lès-Roye (80803)
108. Villers-Tournelle (80805)
109. Warsy (80822)

== History ==
The arrondissement of Montdidier was created in 1800. At the January 2017 reorganisation of the arrondissements of Somme, it received five communes from the arrondissement of Amiens, and it lost 26 communes to the arrondissement of Péronne.

As a result of the reorganisation of the cantons of France which came into effect in 2015, the borders of the cantons are no longer related to the borders of the arrondissements. The cantons of the arrondissement of Montdidier were, as of January 2015:

1. Ailly-sur-Noye
2. Montdidier
3. Moreuil
4. Rosières-en-Santerre
5. Roye
