= Jumel =

- Commune
- The church in Jumel

- Coat of arms
- Location of Jumel
- Location within France Location within Hauts-de-France
- Coordinates: 49°45′34″N 2°21′09″E
- Country: France
- Region: Hauts-de-France
- Department: Somme
- Arrondissement: Montdidier
- Canton: Ailly-sur-Noye
- Intercommunality: CC Avre Luce Noye

Government
  - Mayor (2020–2026): Hubert Vangoethem
- Area^{1}: 8.89 km^{2} (3.43 sq mi)
- Elevation: 65 m (213 ft)
- Highest elevation: 135 m (443 ft)
- Lowest elevation: 48 m (157 ft)
- Population (2023): 532
  - Density: 59.8/km^{2} (155/sq mi)
- Time zone: UTC+01:00 (CET)
  - Summer (DST): UTC+02:00 (CEST)
- INSEE/Postal code: 80452 /80250
- ^{1} French Land Register data, which excludes lakes, ponds, glaciers > 1 km^{2} (0.386 sq mi or 247 acres) and river estuaries.

Jumel (French pronunciation: [ʒymɛl]; Picard: Jumèl) is a commune in the Somme department in Hauts-de-France in northern France.

== Geography ==
Jumel is situated on the D7 and D920 junction, by the banks of the river Noye, some 10 miles (16 km) south of Amiens.

== Population ==
Historical population
Year	Pop.	±% p.a.
1968	322	—
1975	291	−1.44%
1982	268	−1.17%
1990	303	+1.55%
1999	368	+2.18%
2007	354	−0.48%
2012	452	+5.01%
2017	518	+2.76%
2023	532	+0.45%
Source: INSEE

== See also ==
- Communes of the Somme department
