= Chaussoy-Epagny =

- Commune
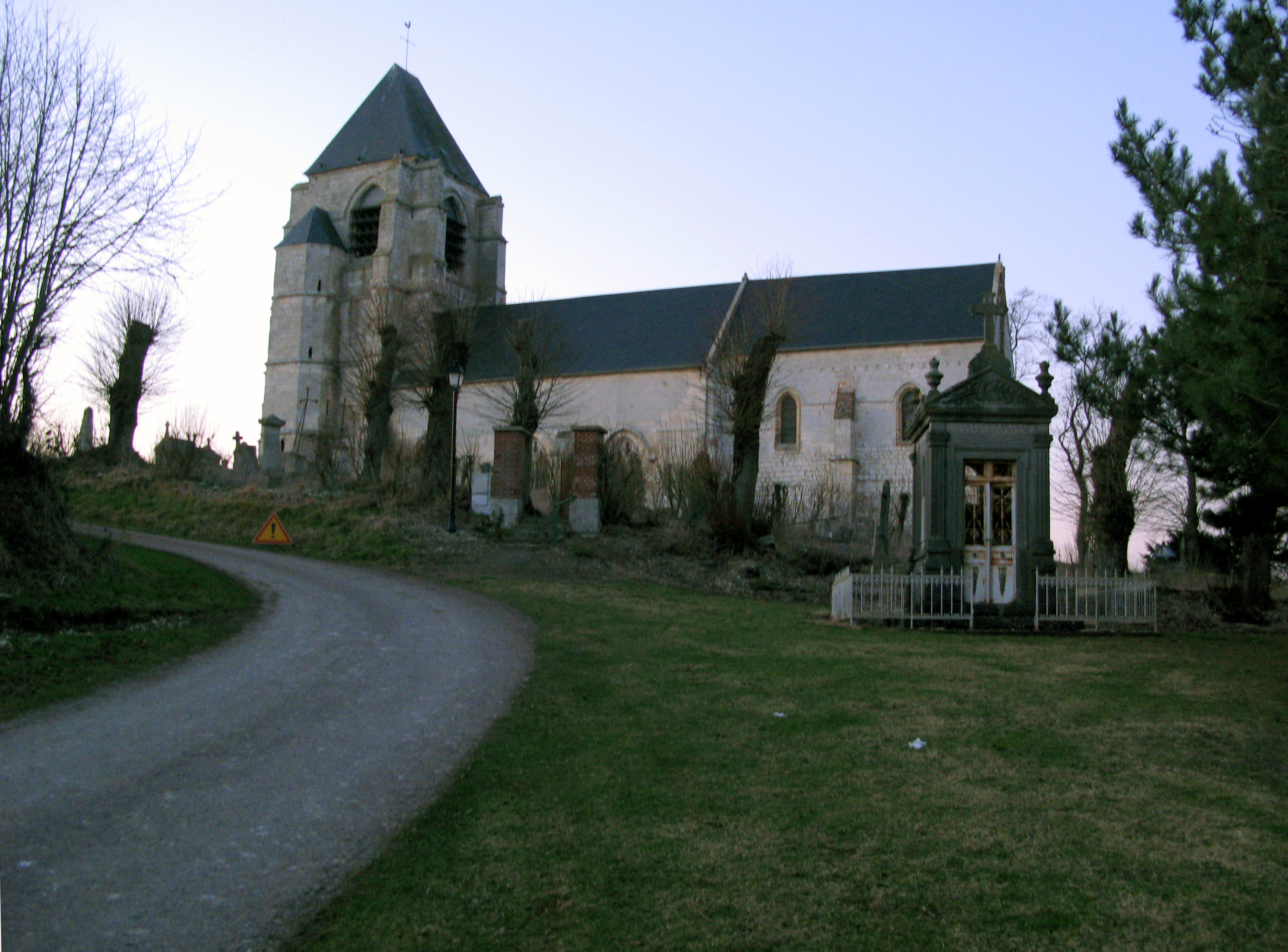
- The church in Chaussoy-Epagny
- Location of Chaussoy-Epagny
- Location within France Location within Hauts-de-France
- Coordinates: 49°43′39″N 2°19′53″E
- Country: France
- Region: Hauts-de-France
- Department: Somme
- Arrondissement: Montdidier
- Canton: Ailly-sur-Noye
- Intercommunality: CC Avre Luce Noye

Government
  - Mayor (2021–2026): Christian De Caffarelli
- Area^{1}: 11.59 km^{2} (4.47 sq mi)
- Elevation: 110 m (360 ft)
- Highest elevation: 143 m (469 ft)
- Lowest elevation: 52 m (171 ft)
- Population (2023): 570
  - Density: 49/km^{2} (130/sq mi)
- Time zone: UTC+01:00 (CET)
  - Summer (DST): UTC+02:00 (CEST)
- INSEE/Postal code: 80188 /80250
- ^{1} French Land Register data, which excludes lakes, ponds, glaciers > 1 km^{2} (0.386 sq mi or 247 acres) and river estuaries.

Chaussoy-Epagny (Picard: L’Queuchoy-Épagny) is a commune in the Somme department in Hauts-de-France in northern France.

== Geography ==
The commune is situated on the D193 road, in the valley of the river Noye some 26 kilometres (16 mi) south of Amiens.

== Population ==
Historical population
| Year | Pop. | ±% p.a. |
|---|---|---|
| 1968 | 378 | — |
| 1975 | 382 | +0.15% |
| 1982 | 521 | +4.53% |
| 1990 | 587 | +1.50% |
| 1999 | 622 | +0.65% |
| 2007 | 625 | +0.06% |
| 2012 | 584 | −1.35% |
| 2017 | 581 | −0.10% |
| 2023 | 570 | −0.32% |
Source: INSEE

== See also ==
- Communes of the Somme department
- Réseau des Bains de Mer
