= Louvrechy =

- Commune
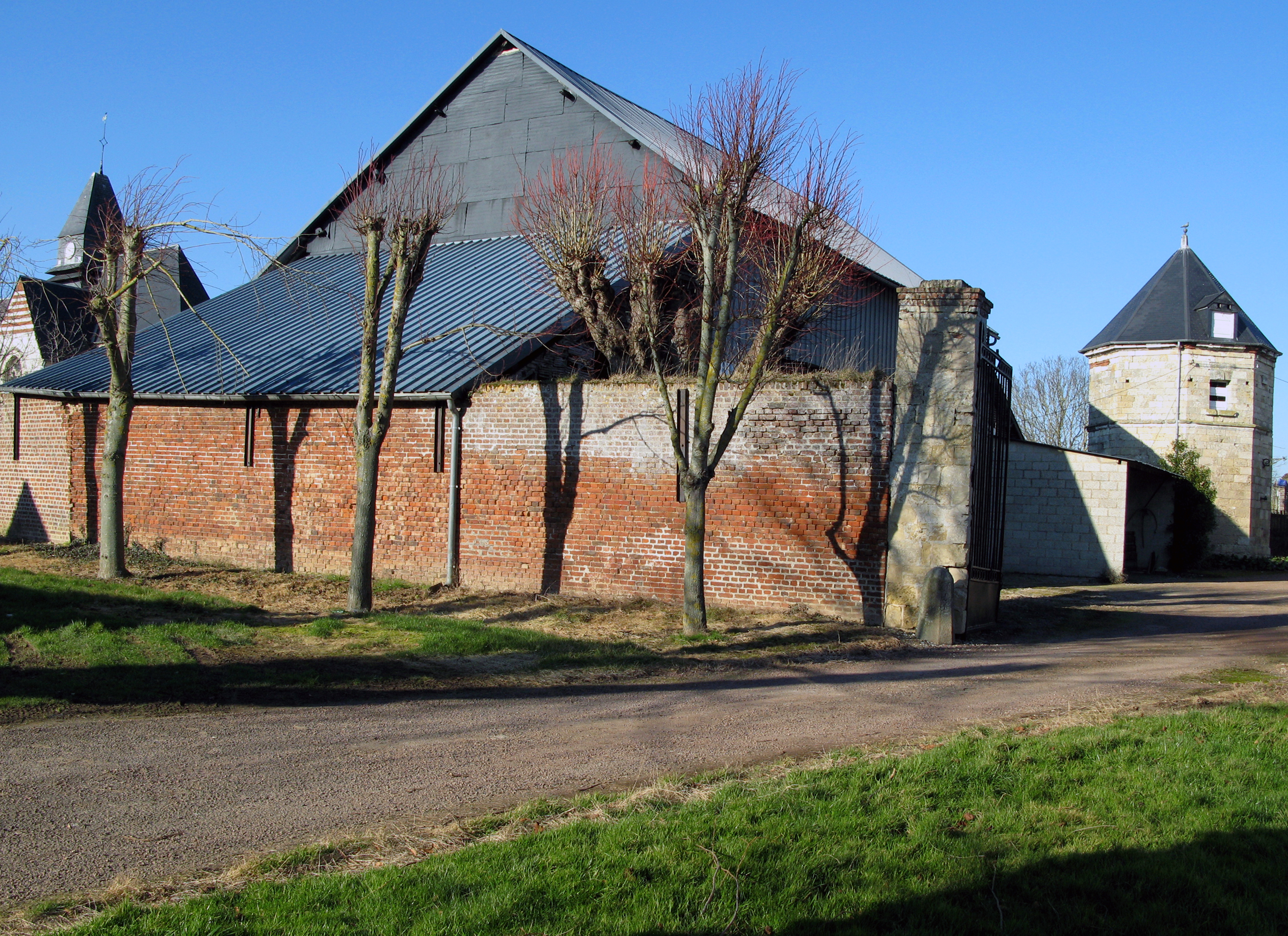
- Dovecote
- Location of Louvrechy
- Location within France Location within Hauts-de-France
- Coordinates: 49°44′02″N 2°23′45″E
- Country: France
- Region: Hauts-de-France
- Department: Somme
- Arrondissement: Montdidier
- Canton: Ailly-sur-Noye
- Intercommunality: CC Avre Luce Noye

Government
  - Mayor (2020–2026): Anne Rihet
- Area^{1}: 5.78 km^{2} (2.23 sq mi)
- Elevation: 117 m (384 ft)
- Highest elevation: 140 m (460 ft)
- Lowest elevation: 88 m (289 ft)
- Population (2023): 197
  - Density: 34.1/km^{2} (88.3/sq mi)
- Time zone: UTC+01:00 (CET)
  - Summer (DST): UTC+02:00 (CEST)
- INSEE/Postal code: 80494 /80250
- ^{1} French Land Register data, which excludes lakes, ponds, glaciers > 1 km^{2} (0.386 sq mi or 247 acres) and river estuaries.

Louvrechy (French pronunciation: [luvʁəʃi]) is a commune in the Somme department in Hauts-de-France in northern France.

== Geography ==
Louvrechy is situated 13 miles (21 km) south of Amiens, in the Noye river valley, at the D83 and D134 crossroads

== Population ==
Historical population
Year	Pop.	±% p.a.
1968	185	—
1975	153	−2.68%
1982	149	−0.38%
1990	144	−0.43%
1999	162	+1.32%
2007	165	+0.23%
2012	206	+4.54%
2017	200	−0.59%
2023	197	−0.25%
Source: INSEE

== See also ==
- Communes of the Somme department
