= Marché-Allouarde =

- Commune
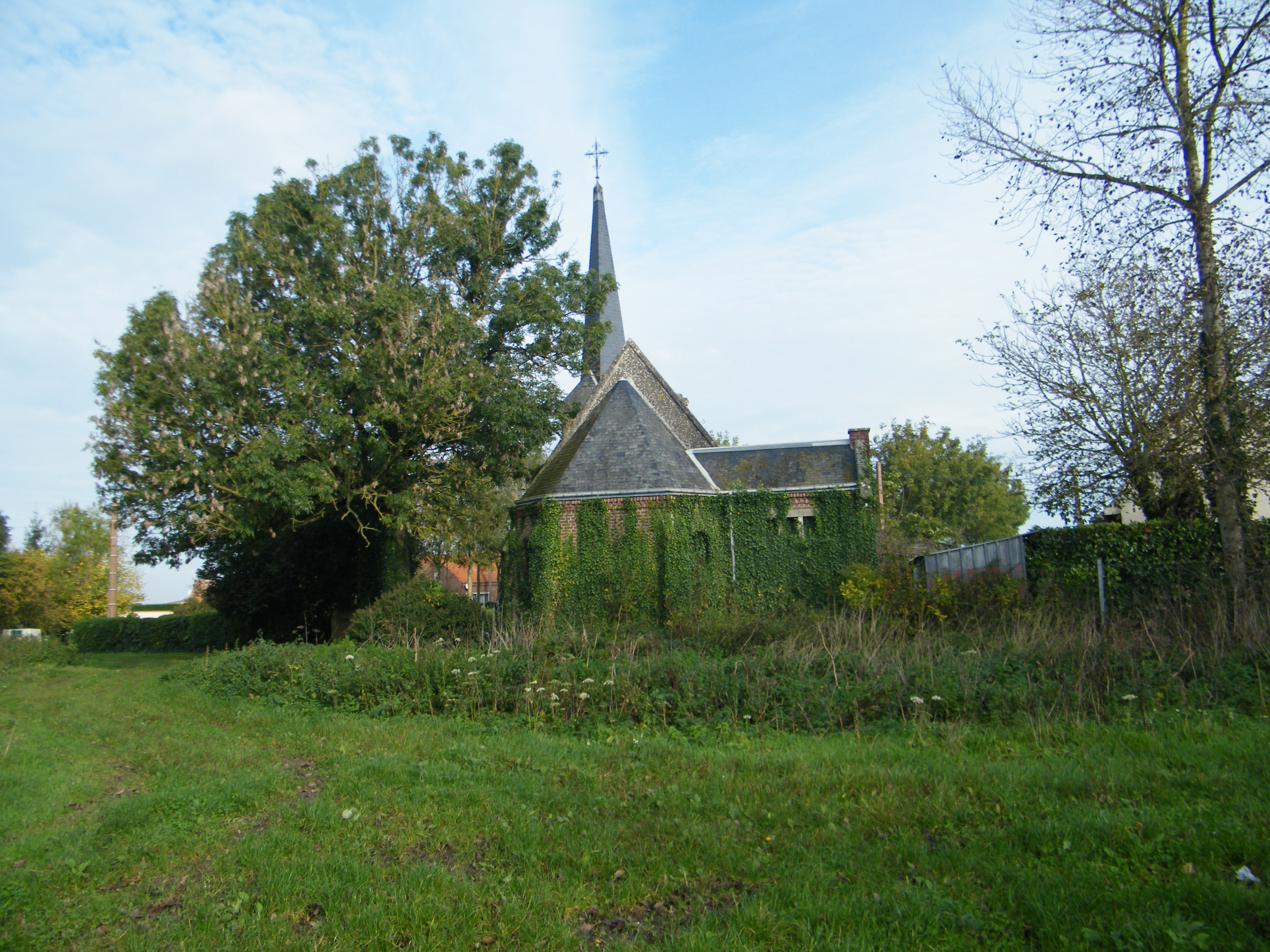
- The church in Marché-Allouarde
- Location of Marché-Allouarde
- Location within France Location within Hauts-de-France
- Coordinates: 49°43′41″N 2°52′06″E
- Country: France
- Region: Hauts-de-France
- Department: Somme
- Arrondissement: Montdidier
- Canton: Roye
- Intercommunality: CC Grand Roye

Government
  - Mayor (2020–2026): Pierre Fardel
- Area^{1}: 2.07 km^{2} (0.80 sq mi)
- Elevation: 80 m (260 ft)
- Highest elevation: 95 m (312 ft)
- Lowest elevation: 84 m (276 ft)
- Population (2023): 51
  - Density: 25/km^{2} (64/sq mi)
- Time zone: UTC+01:00 (CET)
  - Summer (DST): UTC+02:00 (CEST)
- INSEE/Postal code: 80508 /80700
- ^{1} French Land Register data, which excludes lakes, ponds, glaciers > 1 km^{2} (0.386 sq mi or 247 acres) and river estuaries.

Marché-Allouarde is a commune in the Somme department in Hauts-de-France in northern France.

== Geography ==
The commune is situated on the D930 road, some 30 miles (48 km) southeast of Amiens.

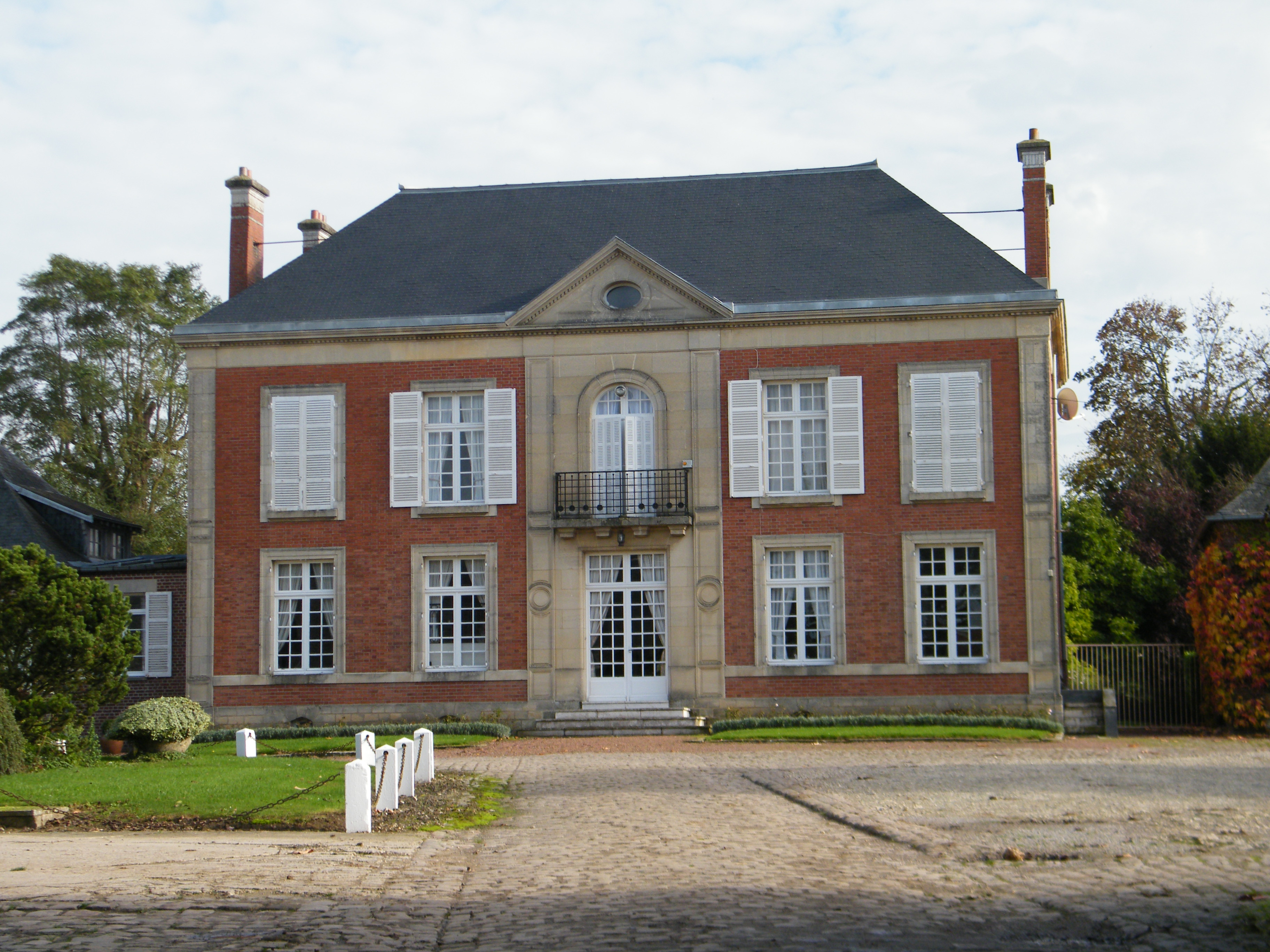
Castle.

== Population ==
Historical population
Year	Pop.	±% p.a.
1968	70	—
1975	64	−1.27%
1982	50	−3.47%
1990	60	+2.31%
1999	77	+2.81%
2007	72	−0.84%
2012	65	−2.02%
2017	53	−4.00%
2023	51	−0.64%
Source: INSEE

== See also ==
- Communes of the Somme department
