= Crémery =

- Commune
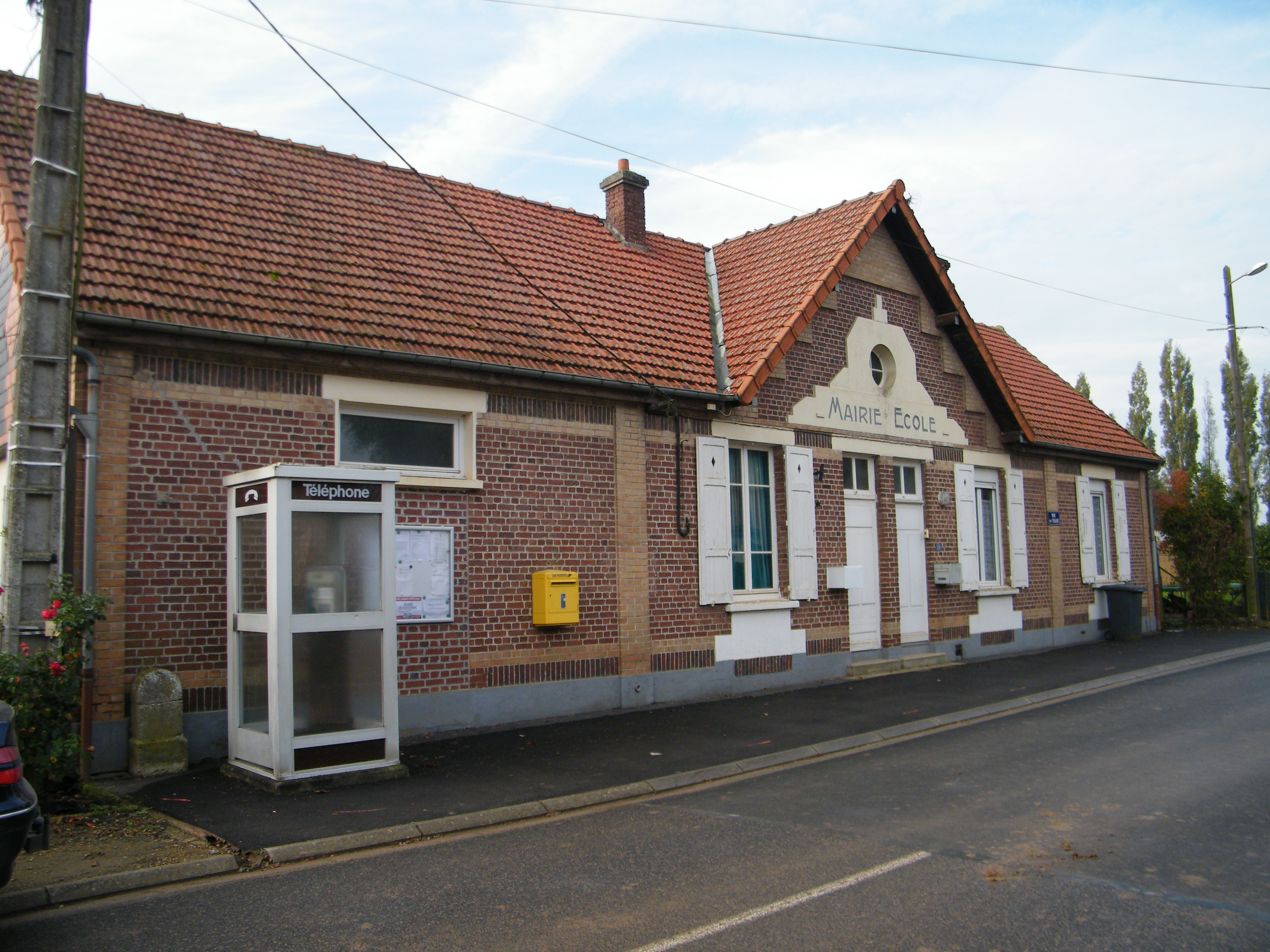
- The town hall in Crémery
- Location of Crémery
- Location within France Location within Hauts-de-France
- Coordinates: 49°44′32″N 2°49′29″E
- Country: France
- Region: Hauts-de-France
- Department: Somme
- Arrondissement: Montdidier
- Canton: Roye
- Intercommunality: CC Grand Roye

Government
  - Mayor (2020–2026): Jean-François Niquet
- Area^{1}: 2.58 km^{2} (1.00 sq mi)
- Elevation: 94 m (308 ft)
- Highest elevation: 96 m (315 ft)
- Lowest elevation: 78 m (256 ft)
- Population (2023): 115
  - Density: 44.6/km^{2} (115/sq mi)
- Time zone: UTC+01:00 (CET)
  - Summer (DST): UTC+02:00 (CEST)
- INSEE/Postal code: 80223 /80700
- ^{1} French Land Register data, which excludes lakes, ponds, glaciers > 1 km^{2} (0.386 sq mi or 247 acres) and river estuaries.

Crémery (French pronunciation: [kʁɛmʁi]; Picard: Crémerin) is a commune in the Somme department in Hauts-de-France in northern France.

== Geography ==
The commune is situated on the D139 road, some 30 miles (48 km) southeast of Amiens.

== Population ==
Historical population
Year	Pop.	±% p.a.
1968	84	—
1975	68	−2.97%
1982	75	+1.41%
1990	53	−4.25%
1999	68	+2.81%
2007	146	+10.02%
2012	126	−2.90%
2017	121	−0.81%
2023	115	−0.84%
Source: INSEE

== See also ==
- Communes of the Somme department
