= Guyencourt-sur-Noye =

- Commune
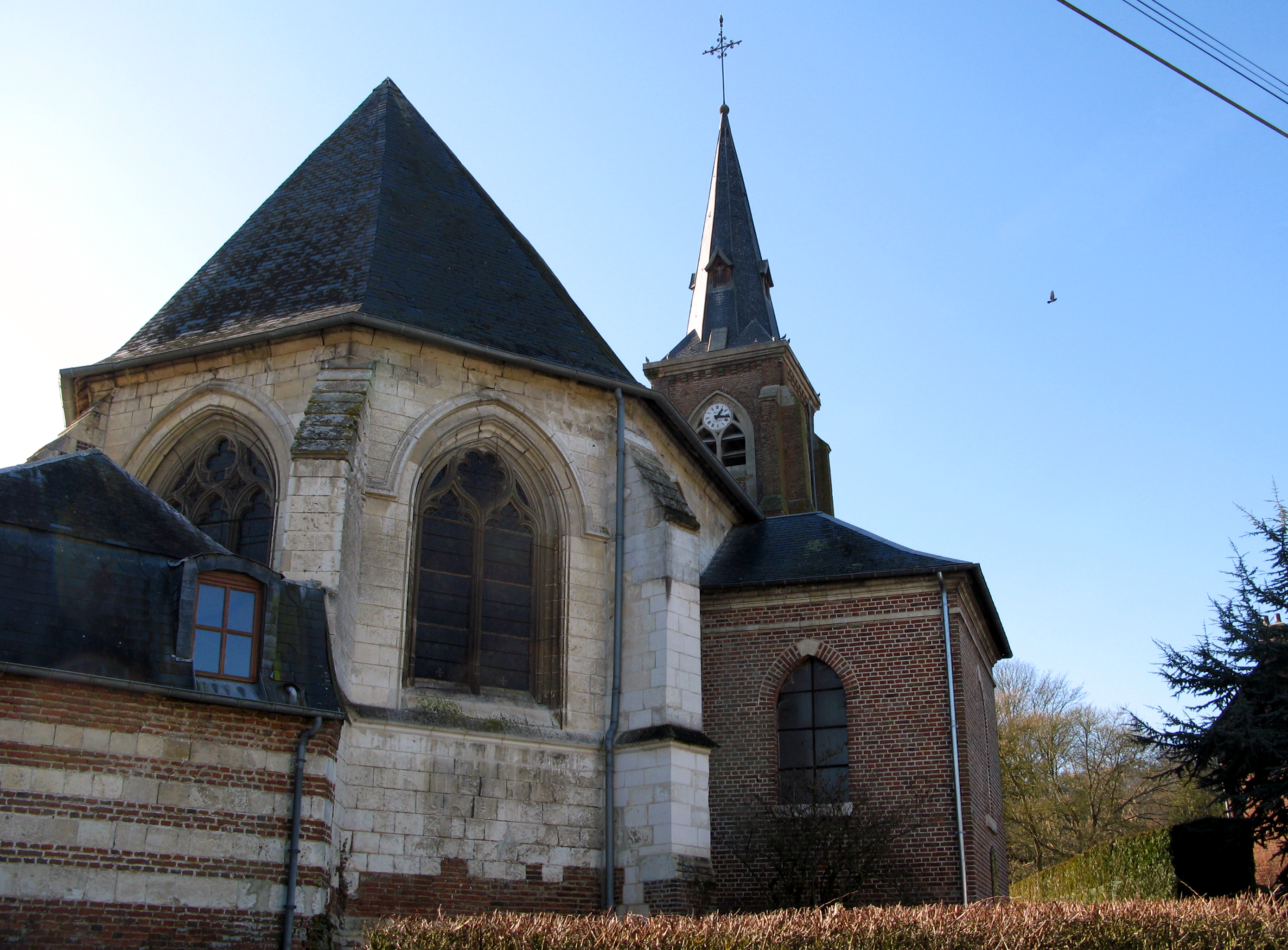
- The church in Guyencourt-sur-Noye
- Location of Guyencourt-sur-Noye
- Location within France Location within Hauts-de-France
- Coordinates: 49°46′51″N 2°22′18″E
- Country: France
- Region: Hauts-de-France
- Department: Somme
- Arrondissement: Montdidier
- Canton: Ailly-sur-Noye
- Intercommunality: CC Avre Luce Noye

Government
  - Mayor (2020–2026): Monique Blin
- Area^{1}: 3.81 km^{2} (1.47 sq mi)
- Elevation: 45 m (148 ft)
- Highest elevation: 115 m (377 ft)
- Lowest elevation: 37 m (121 ft)
- Population (2023): 161
  - Density: 42.3/km^{2} (109/sq mi)
- Time zone: UTC+01:00 (CET)
  - Summer (DST): UTC+02:00 (CEST)
- INSEE/Postal code: 80403 /80250
- ^{1} French Land Register data, which excludes lakes, ponds, glaciers > 1 km^{2} (0.386 sq mi or 247 acres) and river estuaries.

Guyencourt-sur-Noye is a commune in the Somme department in Hauts-de-France in northern France.

== Geography ==
The commune is situated on the D116 road, by the banks of the river Noye, some 10 miles (16 km) south of Amiens.

== History ==
In 1692, the village name was written as Guiencourt.
Prehistoric flint tools have been found in the vicinity

== Population ==
Historical population

Year	Pop.	±% p.a.
1856	332	—
1896	206	−1.19%
1962	158	−0.40%
1968	147	−1.20%
1975	175	+2.52%
1982	186	+0.87%

Year	Pop.	±% p.a.
1990	196	+0.66%
1999	201	+0.28%
2007	169	−2.14%
2012	159	−1.21%
2017	177	+2.17%
2023	161	−1.57%

Source: EHESS and INSEE (1968-2023)

== See also ==
- Communes of the Somme department
