= Biarre =

- Commune
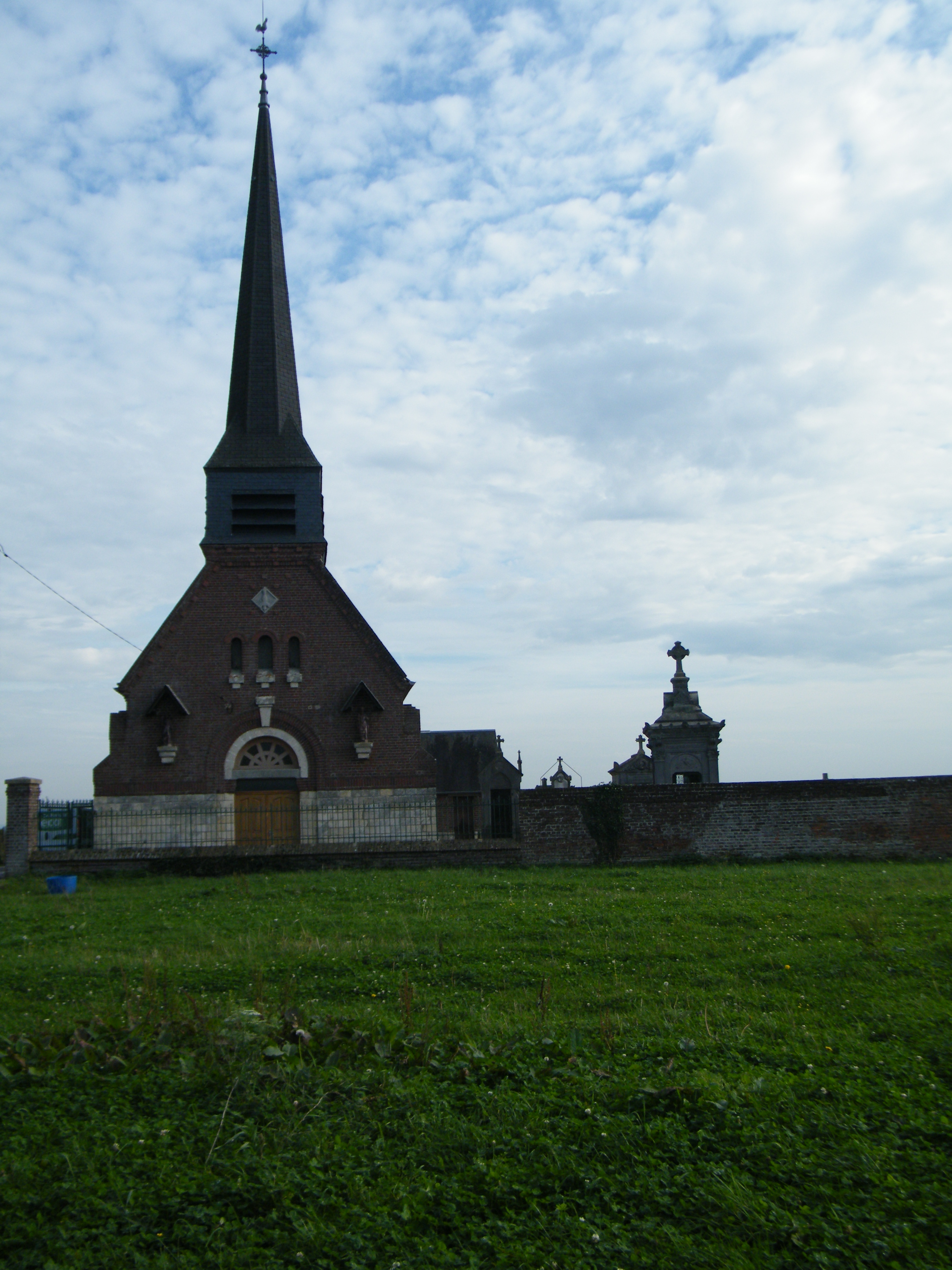
- The church in Biarre
- Location of Biarre
- Location within France Location within Hauts-de-France
- Coordinates: 49°43′19″N 2°52′47″E
- Country: France
- Region: Hauts-de-France
- Department: Somme
- Arrondissement: Montdidier
- Canton: Roye
- Intercommunality: CC Grand Roye

Government
  - Mayor (2020–2026): Jean-Pierre Dhilly
- Area^{1}: 2.4 km^{2} (0.93 sq mi)
- Elevation: 89 m (292 ft)
- Highest elevation: 91 m (299 ft)
- Lowest elevation: 81 m (266 ft)
- Population (2023): 57
  - Density: 24/km^{2} (62/sq mi)
- Time zone: UTC+01:00 (CET)
  - Summer (DST): UTC+02:00 (CEST)
- INSEE/Postal code: 80103 /80190
- ^{1} French Land Register data, which excludes lakes, ponds, glaciers > 1 km^{2} (0.386 sq mi or 247 acres) and river estuaries.

Biarre (French pronunciation: [bjaʁ]) is a commune in the Somme department in Hauts-de-France in northern France.

== Geography ==
Biarre is situated 35 miles (56 km) southeast of Amiens on the D227 road.

== Population ==
Historical population
Year	Pop.	±% p.a.
1968	47	—
1975	53	+1.73%
1982	54	+0.27%
1990	65	+2.34%
1999	71	+0.99%
2007	59	−2.29%
2012	72	+4.06%
2017	67	−1.43%
2023	57	−2.66%
Source: INSEE

== See also ==
- Communes of the Somme department
