= Cottenchy =

- Commune
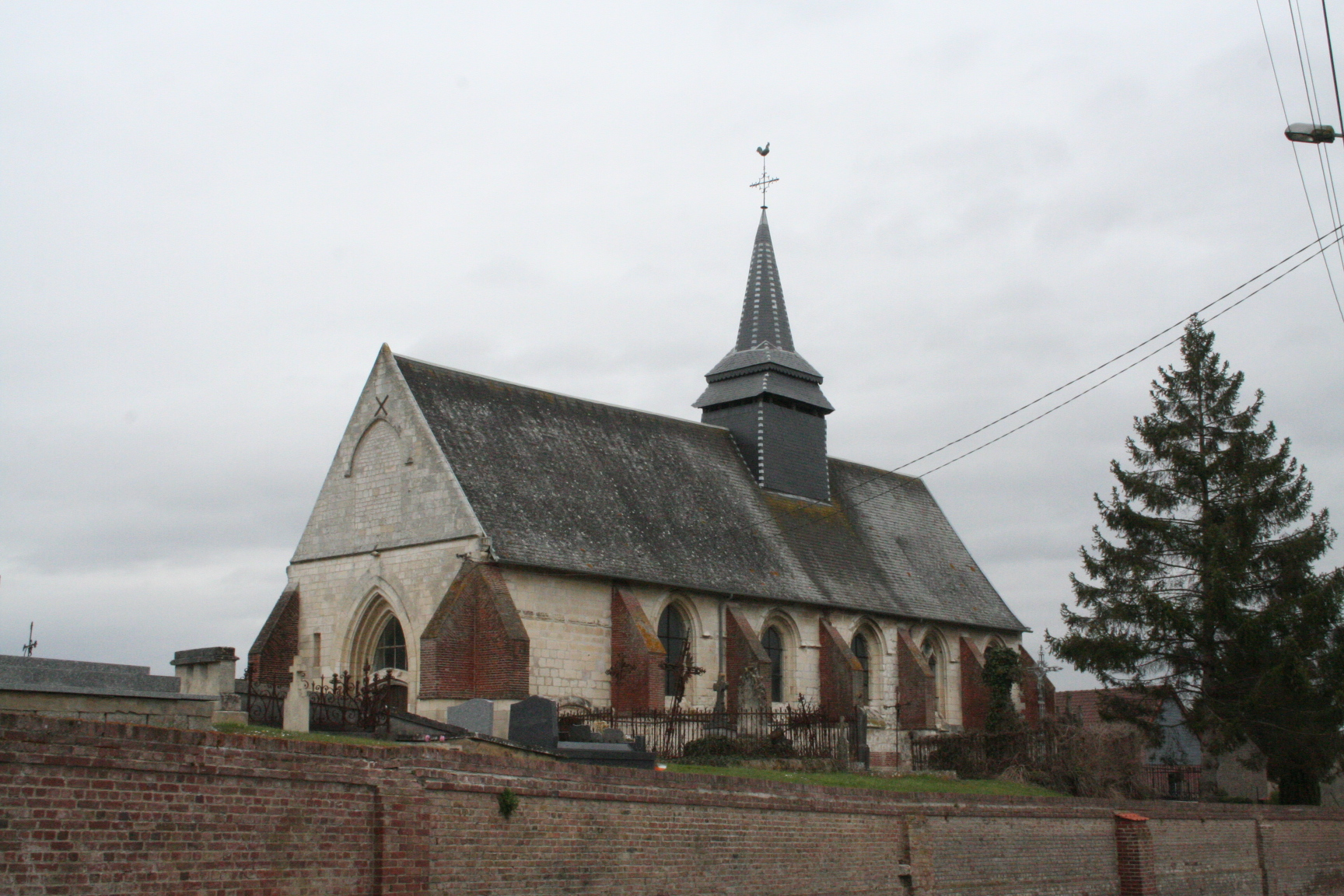
- The church in Cottenchy

- Coat of arms
- Location of Cottenchy
- Location within France Location within Hauts-de-France
- Coordinates: 49°48′36″N 2°23′00″E
- Country: France
- Region: Hauts-de-France
- Department: Somme
- Arrondissement: Montdidier
- Canton: Ailly-sur-Noye
- Intercommunality: CC Avre Luce Noye

Government
  - Mayor (2020–2026): Jérémy Gawlik
- Area^{1}: 10.73 km^{2} (4.14 sq mi)
- Elevation: 40 m (130 ft)
- Highest elevation: 112 m (367 ft)
- Lowest elevation: 31 m (102 ft)
- Population (2023): 566
  - Density: 52.7/km^{2} (137/sq mi)
- Time zone: UTC+01:00 (CET)
  - Summer (DST): UTC+02:00 (CEST)
- INSEE/Postal code: 80213 /80440
- ^{1} French Land Register data, which excludes lakes, ponds, glaciers > 1 km^{2} (0.386 sq mi or 247 acres) and river estuaries.

Cottenchy (French pronunciation: [kɔtɑ̃ʃi]; Picard: Cotinchy) is a commune in the Somme department in Hauts-de-France in northern France.

== Geography ==
Cottenchy is situated on the D75 and D116 crossroads, on the banks of the river Noye, some 8 miles (13 km) southeast of Amiens.

== Population ==
Historical population
| Year | Pop. | ±% p.a. |
|---|---|---|
| 1968 | 296 | — |
| 1975 | 341 | +2.04% |
| 1982 | 368 | +1.09% |
| 1990 | 385 | +0.57% |
| 1999 | 372 | −0.38% |
| 2007 | 446 | +2.29% |
| 2012 | 540 | +3.90% |
| 2017 | 576 | +1.30% |
| 2023 | 566 | −0.29% |
Source: INSEE

== See also ==
- Communes of the Somme department
