= Breteuil, Oise =

Breteuil-sur-Noye
- Commune
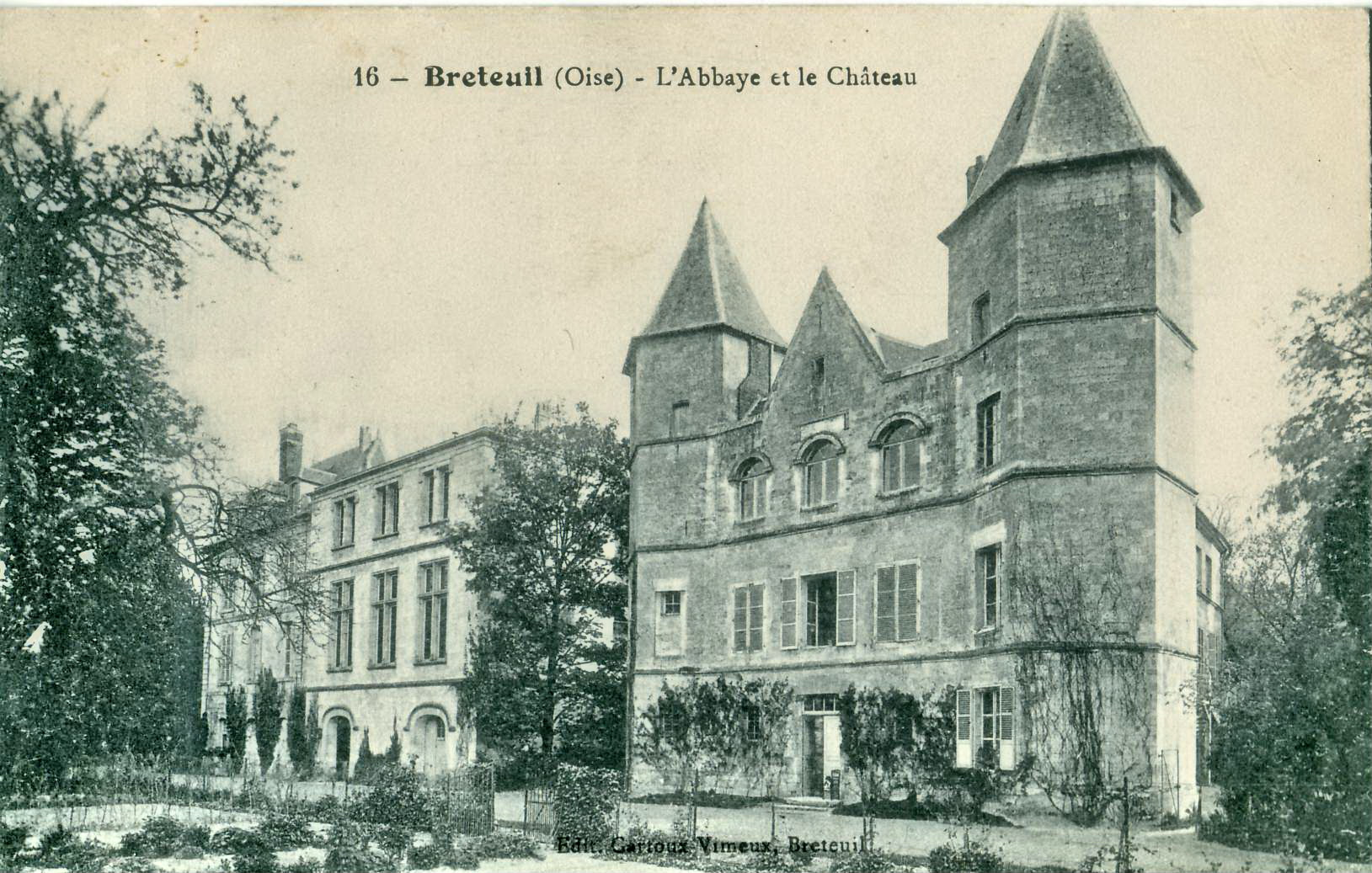
- Former abbey and the castle

- Coat of arms
- Location of Breteuil-sur-Noye
- Location within France Location within Hauts-de-France
- Coordinates: 49°38′00″N 2°17′39″E
- Country: France
- Region: Hauts-de-France
- Department: Oise
- Arrondissement: Clermont
- Canton: Saint-Just-en-Chaussée
- Intercommunality: Oise Picarde

Government
  - Mayor (2020–2026): Jean Cauwel
- Area^{1}: 17.27 km^{2} (6.67 sq mi)
- Elevation: 102 m (335 ft)
- Highest elevation: 166 m (545 ft)
- Lowest elevation: 70 m (230 ft)
- Population (2023): 4,222
  - Density: 244.5/km^{2} (633.2/sq mi)
- Time zone: UTC+01:00 (CET)
  - Summer (DST): UTC+02:00 (CEST)
- INSEE/Postal code: 60104 /60120
- ^{1} French Land Register data, which excludes lakes, ponds, glaciers > 1 km^{2} (0.386 sq mi or 247 acres) and river estuaries.

Breteuil (French pronunciation: [bʁətœj]; Picard: Berteul) or Breteuil-sur-Noye (French pronunciation: [bʁətœj syʁ nwa], literally Breteuil on Noye) is a commune in the Oise department in northern France.

It is located in the Noye valley.

== Law of Breteuil ==
The Duke of Normandy gave a charter to Breteuil guaranteeing it many freedoms. After the Norman conquest of England and later the Norman Conquest of Ireland, the "law of Breteuil" was granted to many towns in those countries.

== Population ==
Its inhabitants are calles Brituliens in French.

Historical population

Year	Pop.	±% p.a.
1793	2,030	—
1821	2,099	+0.12%
1846	2,561	+0.80%
1872	2,802	+0.35%
1901	2,830	+0.03%
1926	2,426	−0.61%
1946	1,785	−1.52%
1962	2,748	+2.73%
1968	3,085	+1.95%

Year	Pop.	±% p.a.
1975	3,531	+1.95%
1982	3,873	+1.33%
1990	3,879	+0.02%
1999	4,131	+0.70%
2007	4,287	+0.46%
2012	4,475	+0.86%
2017	4,340	−0.61%
2023	4,222	−0.46%

Source: EHESS and INSEE (1968-2023)

== See also ==
- Communes of the Oise department
