= Canton of Ailly-sur-Noye =

Coordinates: 49°45′25″N 2°21′51″E

Ailly-sur-Noye
- Canton
- Interactive map of Ailly-sur-Noye
- Country: France
- Region: Hauts-de-France
- Department: Somme
- No. of communes: {{{nbcomm}}}
- Area: 451.46 km^{2} (174.31 sq mi)
- Population (2023): 21,322
  - Density: 47.229/km^{2} (122.32/sq mi)
- INSEE code: 80 03

The Canton of Ailly-sur-Noye is a canton situated in the department of the Somme and in the Hauts-de-France region of northern France.

== Geography ==
The canton is organized around the commune of Ailly-sur-Noye.

== Composition ==
At the French canton reorganisation which came into effect in March 2015, the canton was expanded from 22 to 54 communes (3 of which were merged into the new commune Ô-de-Selle):

- Ailly-sur-Noye
- Aubvillers
- Bacouel-sur-Selle
- Belleuse
- Bosquel
- Brassy
- Chaussoy-Epagny
- Chirmont
- Contre
- Conty
- Cottenchy
- Coullemelle
- Courcelles-sous-Thoix
- Dommartin
- Esclainvillers
- Essertaux
- Estrées-sur-Noye
- La Faloise
- Flers-sur-Noye
- Fleury
- Folleville
- Fossemanant
- Fouencamps
- Fransures
- Frémontiers
- Grattepanche
- Grivesnes
- Guyencourt-sur-Noye
- Hallivillers
- Jumel
- Lawarde-Mauger-l'Hortoy
- Louvrechy
- Mailly-Raineval
- Monsures
- Namps-Maisnil
- Nampty
- Ô-de-Selle
- Oresmaux
- Plachy-Buyon
- Prouzel
- Quiry-le-Sec
- Remiencourt
- Rogy
- Rouvrel
- Saint-Sauflieu
- Sauvillers-Mongival
- Sentelie
- Sourdon
- Thézy-Glimont
- Thoix
- Thory
- Velennes

== Population ==
Historical population
Year	Pop.	±% p.a.
2013	21,147	—
2018	21,636	+0.46%
Source: INSEE

== See also ==
- Arrondissements of the Somme department
- Cantons of the Somme department
- Communes of the Somme department
