= Liancourt-Fosse =

- Commune
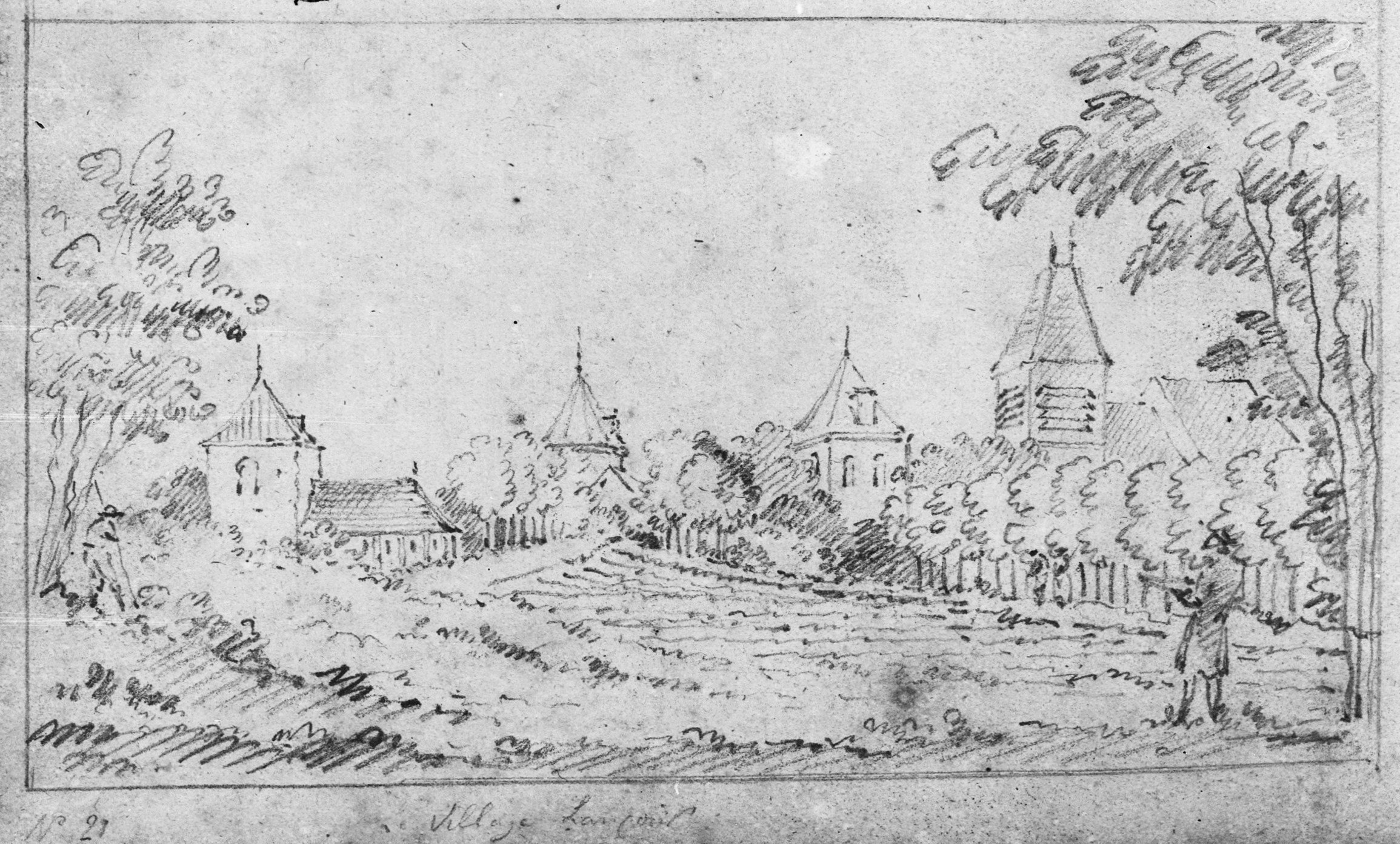
- The chateau in Liancourt-Fosse

- Coat of arms
- Location of Liancourt-Fosse
- Location within France Location within Hauts-de-France
- Coordinates: 49°45′21″N 2°48′59″E
- Country: France
- Region: Hauts-de-France
- Department: Somme
- Arrondissement: Montdidier
- Canton: Roye
- Intercommunality: CC Grand Roye

Government
  - Mayor (2020–2026): Frédérick Boquet
- Area^{1}: 6.44 km^{2} (2.49 sq mi)
- Elevation: 82 m (269 ft)
- Highest elevation: 96 m (315 ft)
- Lowest elevation: 71 m (233 ft)
- Population (2023): 292
  - Density: 45.3/km^{2} (117/sq mi)
- Time zone: UTC+01:00 (CET)
  - Summer (DST): UTC+02:00 (CEST)
- INSEE/Postal code: 80473 /80700
- ^{1} French Land Register data, which excludes lakes, ponds, glaciers > 1 km^{2} (0.386 sq mi or 247 acres) and river estuaries.

Liancourt-Fosse (French pronunciation: [ljɑ̃kuʁ fos]) is a commune in the Somme department in Hauts-de-France in northern France.

== Geography ==
The commune is situated at the junction of the D227 and N17 roads, half a mile from the A1 autoroute and some 30 miles (48 km) southeast of Amiens.

== Population ==
Historical population
Year	Pop.	±% p.a.
1968	220	—
1975	226	+0.39%
1982	221	−0.32%
1990	226	+0.28%
1999	231	+0.24%
2007	235	+0.21%
2012	284	+3.86%
2017	301	+1.17%
2023	292	−0.50%
Source: INSEE

== See also ==
- Communes of the Somme department
