= Flers-sur-Noye =

- Commune
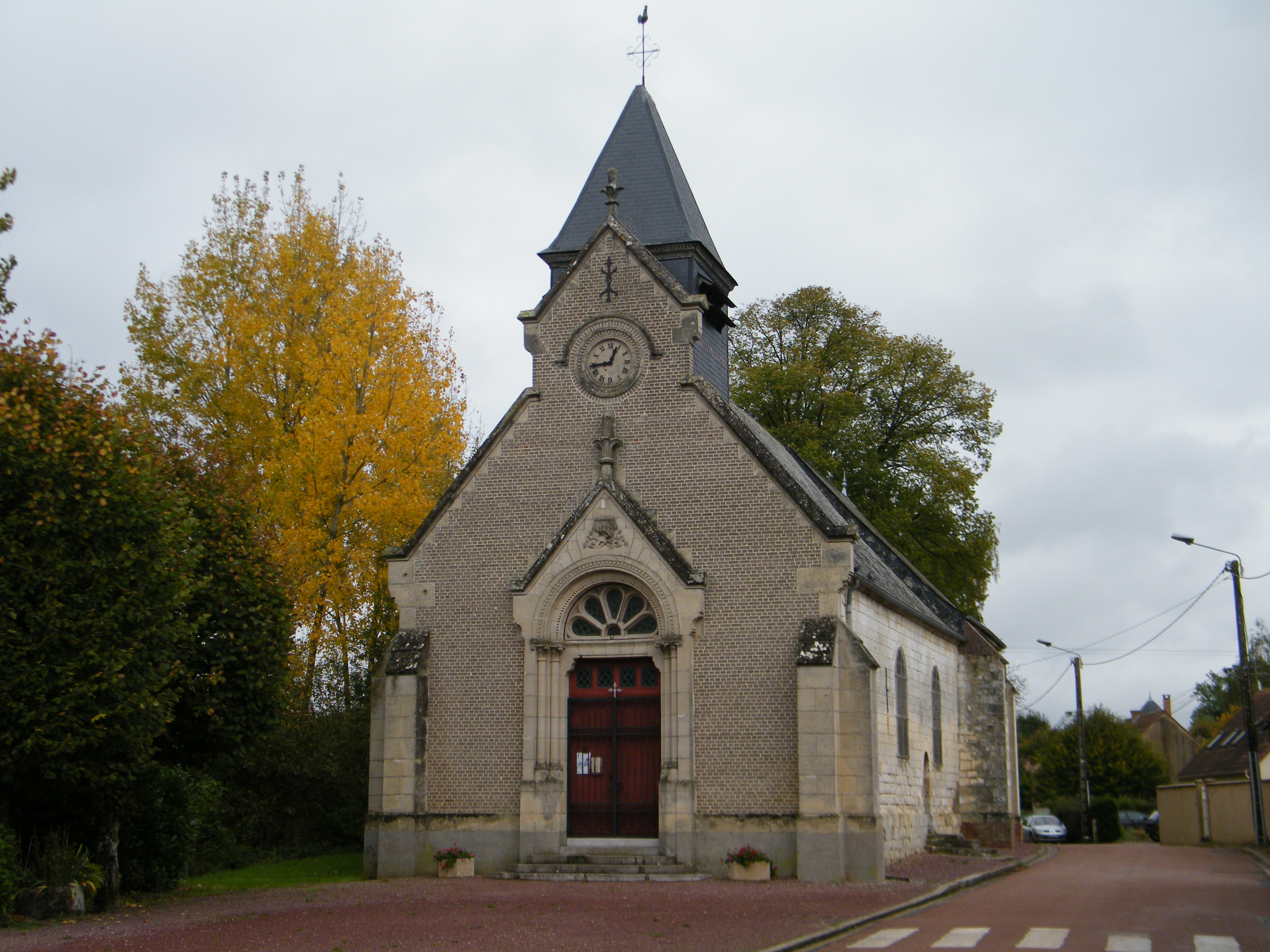
- Church of Saint-Pierre

- Coat of arms
- Location of Flers-sur-Noye
- Location within France Location within Hauts-de-France
- Coordinates: 49°43′59″N 2°15′14″E
- Country: France
- Region: Hauts-de-France
- Department: Somme
- Arrondissement: Montdidier
- Canton: Ailly-sur-Noye
- Intercommunality: CC Avre Luce Noye

Government
  - Mayor (2020–2026): Joël Beaumont
- Area^{1}: 4.65 km^{2} (1.80 sq mi)
- Elevation: 147 m (482 ft)
- Highest elevation: 159 m (522 ft)
- Lowest elevation: 113 m (371 ft)
- Population (2023): 531
  - Density: 114/km^{2} (296/sq mi)
- Time zone: UTC+01:00 (CET)
  - Summer (DST): UTC+02:00 (CEST)
- INSEE/Postal code: 80315 /80160
- ^{1} French Land Register data, which excludes lakes, ponds, glaciers > 1 km^{2} (0.386 sq mi or 247 acres) and river estuaries.

Flers-sur-Noye (French pronunciation: [flɛʁ syʁ nwa], literally Flers on Noye; Picard: Flèr-su-Noée ) is a commune in the Somme department in Hauts-de-France in northern France.

== Geography ==
The commune is situated on the N1 road, a mile from the junction with the A16 autoroute, on the banks of the river Noye, some 15 miles (24 km) south of Amiens.

== Population ==
Historical population
Year	Pop.	±% p.a.
1968	223	—
1975	220	−0.19%
1982	247	+1.67%
1990	299	+2.42%
1999	342	+1.50%
2007	361	+0.68%
2012	461	+5.01%
2017	506	+1.88%
2023	531	+0.81%
Source: INSEE

== See also ==
- Communes of the Somme department
