= Lawarde-Mauger-l'Hortoy =

- Commune
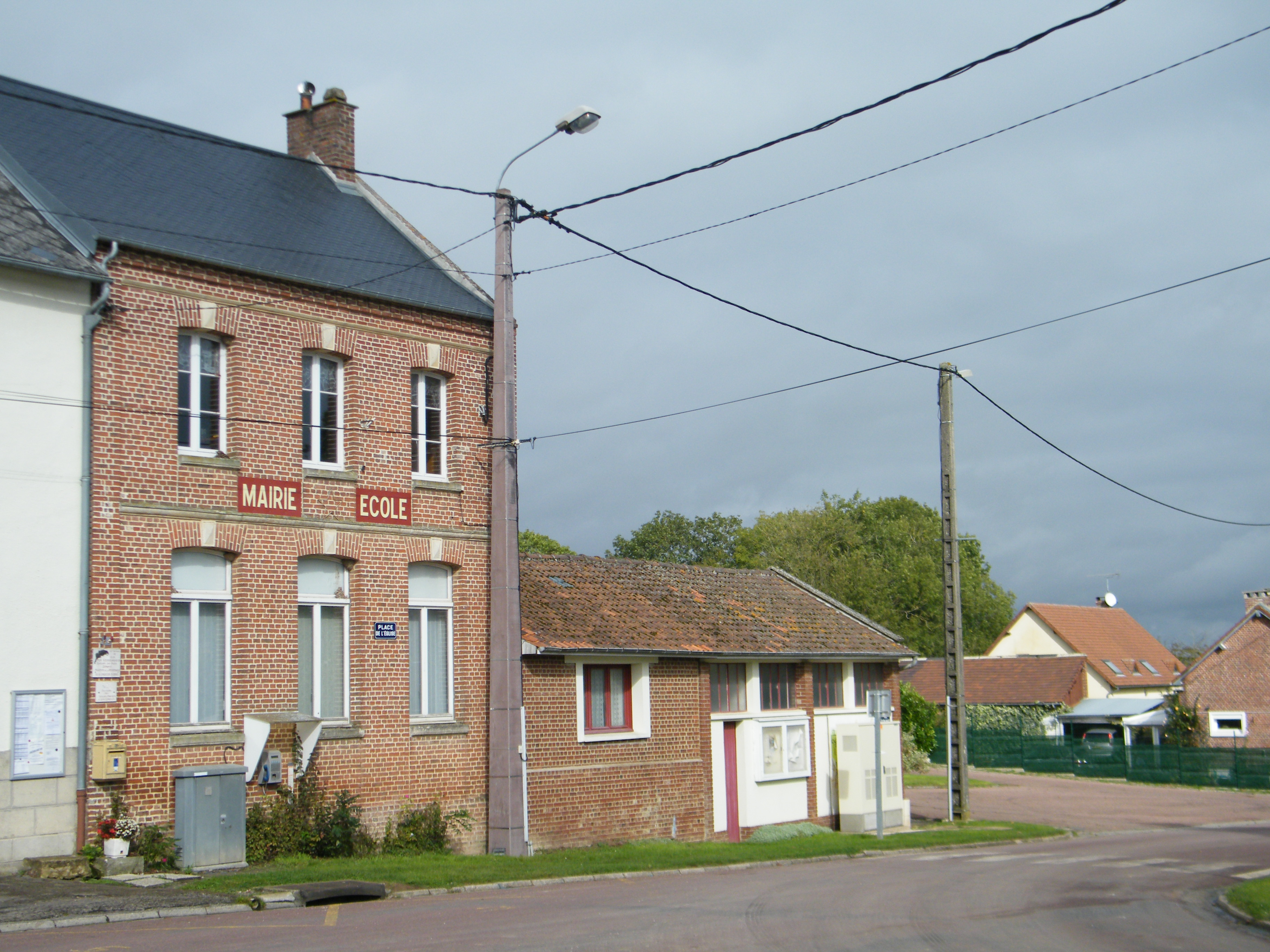
- The town hall and school in Lawarde-Mauger-l'Hortoy
- Location of Lawarde-Mauger-l'Hortoy
- Location within France Location within Hauts-de-France
- Coordinates: 49°42′29″N 2°16′49″E
- Country: France
- Region: Hauts-de-France
- Department: Somme
- Arrondissement: Montdidier
- Canton: Ailly-sur-Noye
- Intercommunality: CC Avre Luce Noye

Government
  - Mayor (2020–2026): Gautier Tourniquet
- Area^{1}: 9.32 km^{2} (3.60 sq mi)
- Elevation: 162 m (531 ft)
- Highest elevation: 167 m (548 ft)
- Lowest elevation: 89 m (292 ft)
- Population (2023): 154
  - Density: 16.5/km^{2} (42.8/sq mi)
- Time zone: UTC+01:00 (CET)
  - Summer (DST): UTC+02:00 (CEST)
- INSEE/Postal code: 80469 /80250
- ^{1} French Land Register data, which excludes lakes, ponds, glaciers > 1 km^{2} (0.386 sq mi or 247 acres) and river estuaries.

Lawarde-Mauger-l'Hortoy is a commune in the Somme department in Hauts-de-France in northern France.

== Geography ==
The commune is situated on the D109 road, some 15 miles (24 km) south of Amiens.

== Population ==
Historical population
Year	Pop.	±% p.a.
1968	160	—
1975	146	−1.30%
1982	141	−0.50%
1990	128	−1.20%
1999	132	+0.34%
2007	162	+2.59%
2012	185	+2.69%
2017	173	−1.33%
2023	154	−1.92%
Source: INSEE

== See also ==
- Communes of the Somme department
