= Chirmont =

- Commune
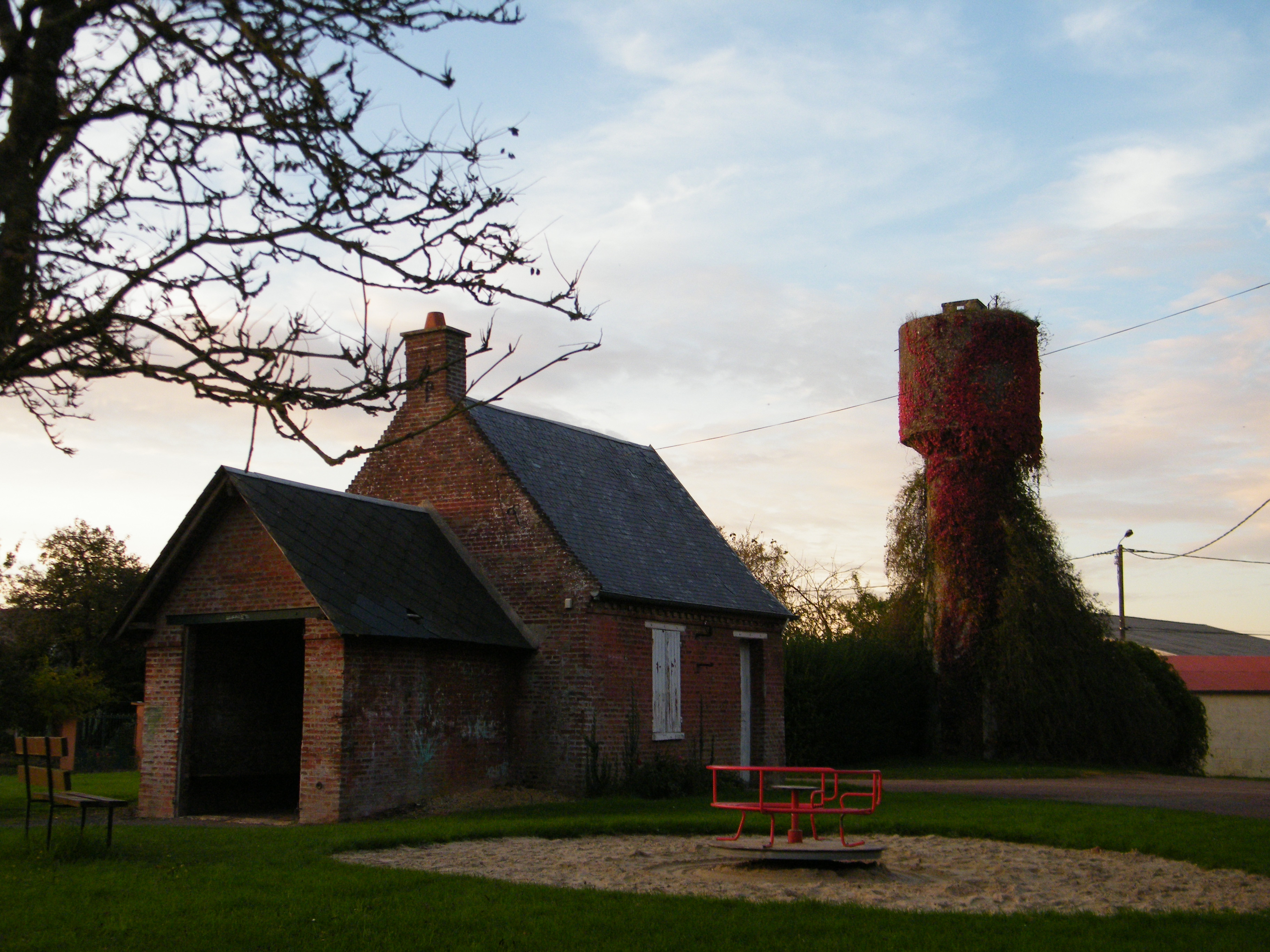
- Municipal playground and shelter
- Location of Chirmont
- Location within France Location within Hauts-de-France
- Coordinates: 49°42′48″N 2°23′09″E
- Country: France
- Region: Hauts-de-France
- Department: Somme
- Arrondissement: Montdidier
- Canton: Ailly-sur-Noye
- Intercommunality: CC Avre Luce Noye

Government
  - Mayor (2020–2026): Jean-Michel Vanooteghem
- Area^{1}: 7.85 km^{2} (3.03 sq mi)
- Elevation: 140 m (460 ft)
- Highest elevation: 149 m (489 ft)
- Lowest elevation: 59 m (194 ft)
- Population (2023): 158
  - Density: 20.1/km^{2} (52.1/sq mi)
- Time zone: UTC+01:00 (CET)
  - Summer (DST): UTC+02:00 (CEST)
- INSEE/Postal code: 80193 /80250
- ^{1} French Land Register data, which excludes lakes, ponds, glaciers > 1 km^{2} (0.386 sq mi or 247 acres) and river estuaries.

Chirmont (French pronunciation: [ʃiʁmɔ̃]) is a commune in the Somme department in Hauts-de-France in northern France.

== Geography ==
Chirmont is situated on the D188 road, some 14 miles (23 km) south of Amiens.

== Population ==
Historical population
Year	Pop.	±% p.a.
1968	102	—
1975	108	+0.82%
1982	102	−0.81%
1990	106	+0.48%
1999	108	+0.21%
2007	121	+1.43%
2012	122	+0.16%
2017	119	−0.50%
2023	158	+4.84%
Source: INSEE

== See also ==
- Communes of the Somme department
