= Thory, Somme =

Thory
- Commune
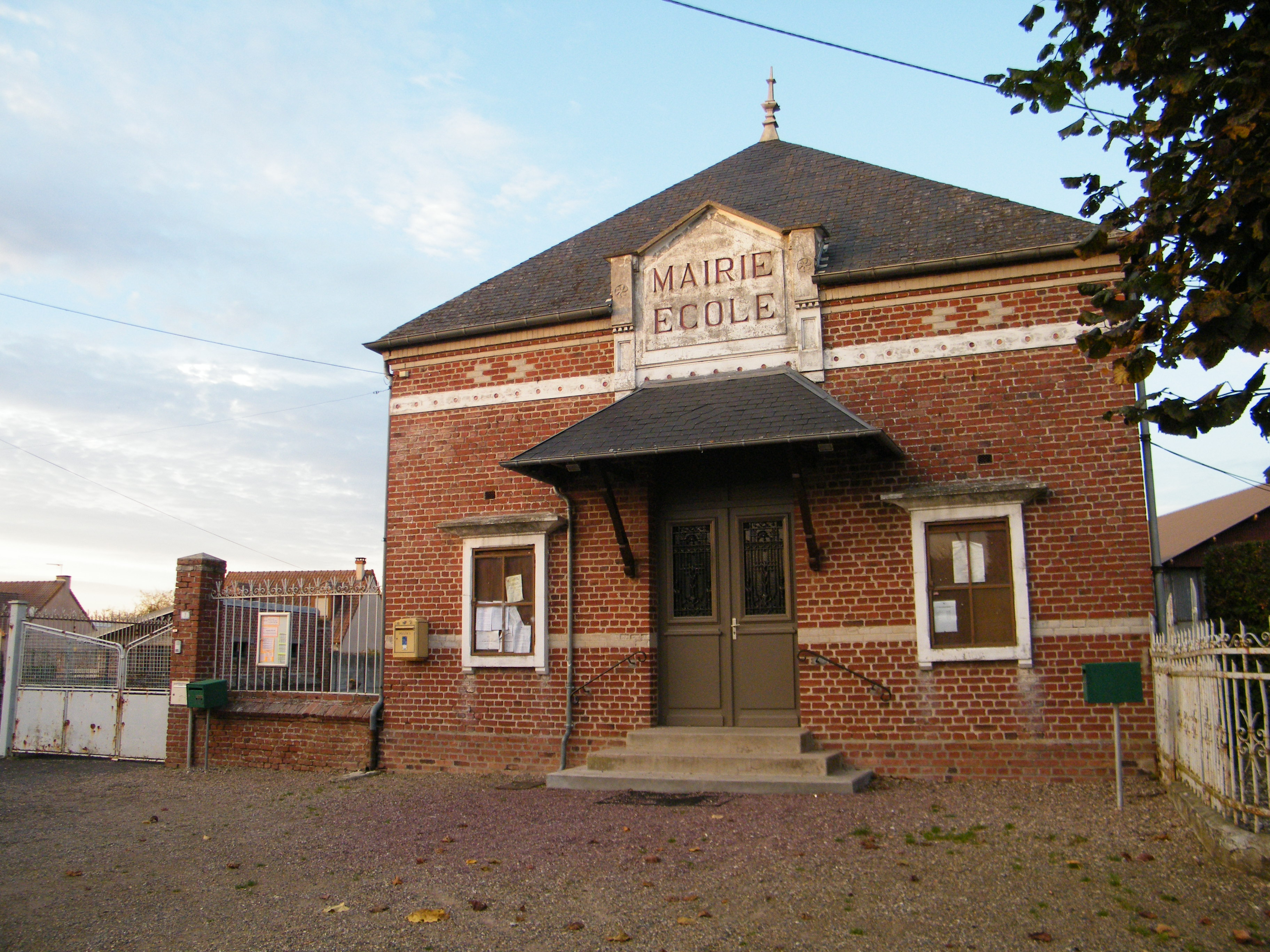
- The town hall in Thory
- Location of Thory
- Location within France Location within Hauts-de-France
- Coordinates: 49°43′13″N 2°26′09″E
- Country: France
- Region: Hauts-de-France
- Department: Somme
- Arrondissement: Montdidier
- Canton: Ailly-sur-Noye
- Intercommunality: CC Avre Luce Noye

Government
  - Mayor (2020–2026): Dominique Clément
- Area^{1}: 5.19 km^{2} (2.00 sq mi)
- Elevation: 90 m (300 ft)
- Highest elevation: 132 m (433 ft)
- Lowest elevation: 85 m (279 ft)
- Population (2023): 207
  - Density: 39.9/km^{2} (103/sq mi)
- Time zone: UTC+01:00 (CET)
  - Summer (DST): UTC+02:00 (CEST)
- INSEE/Postal code: 80758 /80250
- ^{1} French Land Register data, which excludes lakes, ponds, glaciers > 1 km^{2} (0.386 sq mi or 247 acres) and river estuaries.

Thory (French pronunciation: [tɔʁi]) is a commune in the Somme department in Hauts-de-France in northern France.

== Geography ==
Thory is situated 15 miles (24 km) southeast of Amiens, on the D83 road

== Population ==
Historical population
| Year | Pop. | ±% p.a. |
|---|---|---|
| 1968 | 124 | — |
| 1975 | 101 | −2.89% |
| 1982 | 106 | +0.69% |
| 1990 | 129 | +2.49% |
| 1999 | 150 | +1.69% |
| 2007 | 162 | +0.97% |
| 2012 | 172 | +1.21% |
| 2017 | 195 | +2.54% |
| 2023 | 207 | +1.00% |
Source: INSEE

== See also ==
- Communes of the Somme department
