= Rouvrel =

- Commune
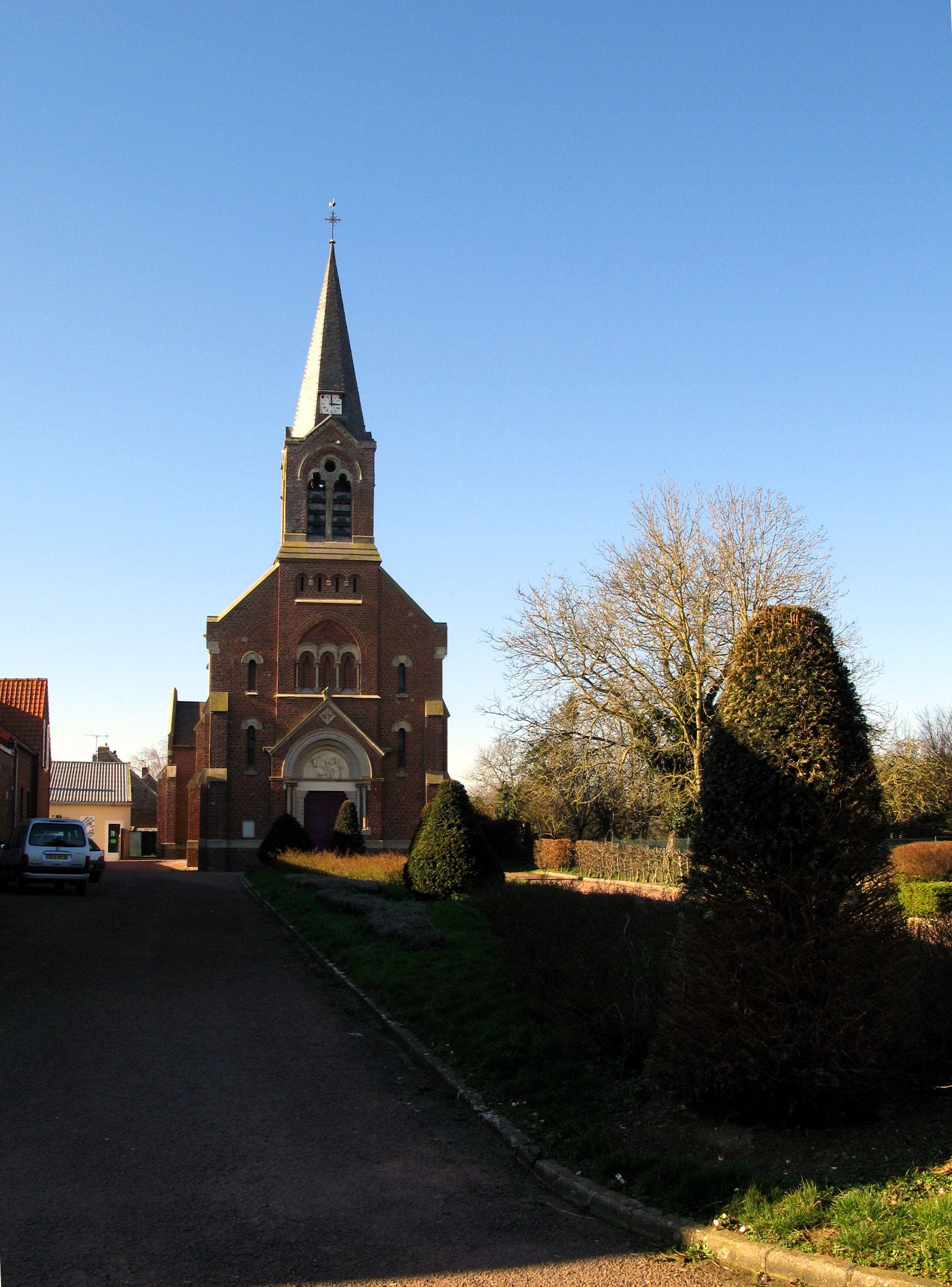
- The church in Rouvrel
- Location of Rouvrel
- Location within France Location within Hauts-de-France
- Coordinates: 49°46′17″N 2°24′47″E
- Country: France
- Region: Hauts-de-France
- Department: Somme
- Arrondissement: Montdidier
- Canton: Ailly-sur-Noye
- Intercommunality: CC Avre Luce Noye

Government
  - Mayor (2020–2026): Jean-Maurice Leroy
- Area^{1}: 7.16 km^{2} (2.76 sq mi)
- Elevation: 110 m (360 ft)
- Highest elevation: 121 m (397 ft)
- Lowest elevation: 65 m (213 ft)
- Population (2023): 304
  - Density: 42.5/km^{2} (110/sq mi)
- Time zone: UTC+01:00 (CET)
  - Summer (DST): UTC+02:00 (CEST)
- INSEE/Postal code: 80681 /80250
- ^{1} French Land Register data, which excludes lakes, ponds, glaciers > 1 km^{2} (0.386 sq mi or 247 acres) and river estuaries.

Rouvrel (French pronunciation: [ʁuvʁɛl]) is a commune in the Somme department in Hauts-de-France in northern France.

== Geography ==
Rouvrel is situated some 10 miles (16 km) south of Amiens, just off the D920 road

== Population ==
Historical population
Year	Pop.	±% p.a.
1968	201	—
1975	204	+0.21%
1982	206	+0.14%
1990	211	+0.30%
1999	238	+1.35%
2007	276	+1.87%
2012	277	+0.07%
2017	306	+2.01%
2023	304	−0.11%
Source: INSEE

== Places of interest ==
- The church

== See also ==
- Communes of the Somme department
