= Hallivillers =

- Commune
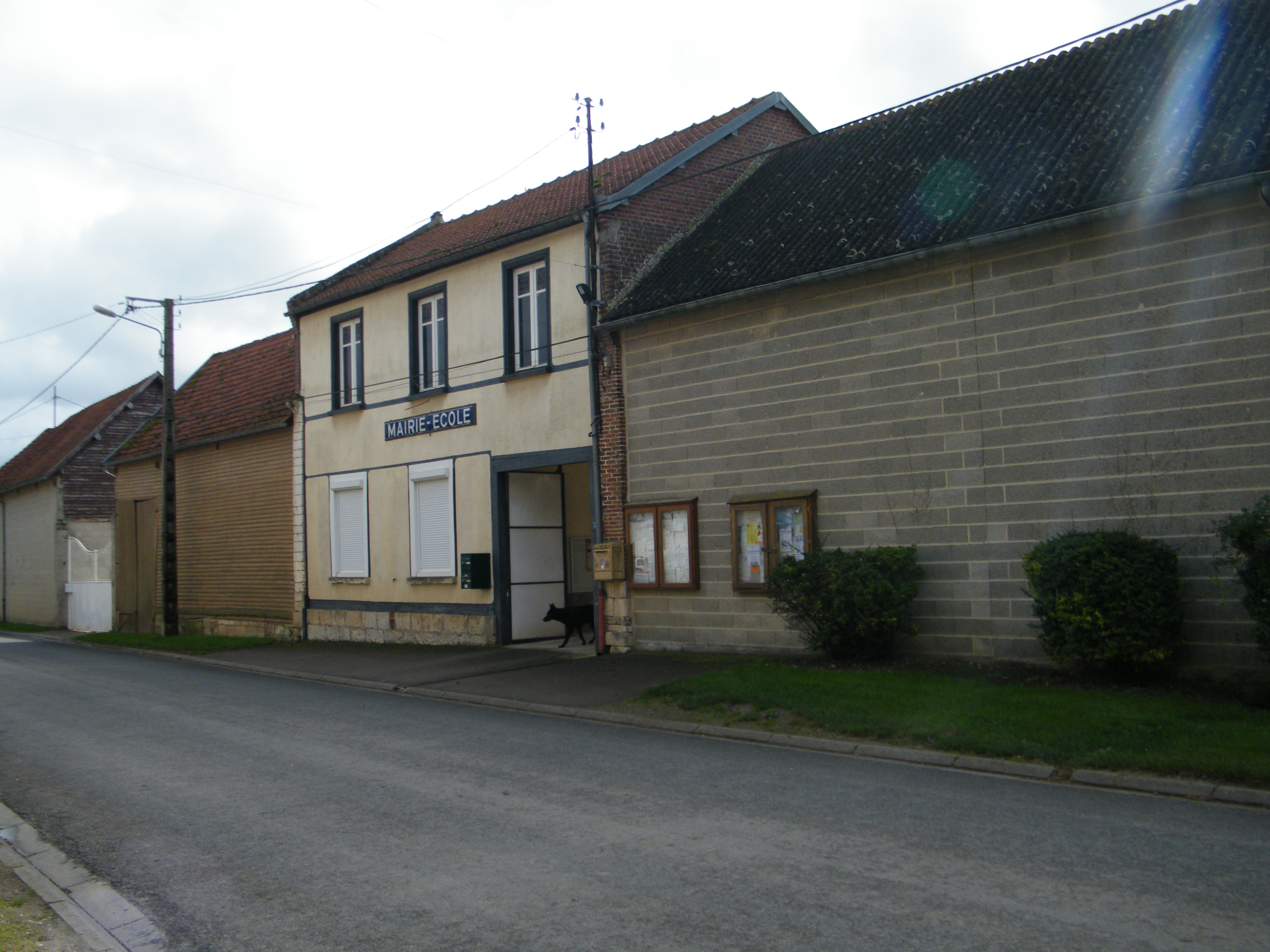
- The town hall in Hallivillers
- Location of Hallivillers
- Location within France Location within Hauts-de-France
- Coordinates: 49°42′04″N 2°17′21″E
- Country: France
- Region: Hauts-de-France
- Department: Somme
- Arrondissement: Montdidier
- Canton: Ailly-sur-Noye
- Intercommunality: CC Avre Luce Noye

Government
  - Mayor (2020–2026): Patrick Depret
- Area^{1}: 7.12 km^{2} (2.75 sq mi)
- Elevation: 100 m (330 ft)
- Highest elevation: 158 m (518 ft)
- Lowest elevation: 86 m (282 ft)
- Population (2023): 142
  - Density: 19.9/km^{2} (51.7/sq mi)
- Time zone: UTC+01:00 (CET)
  - Summer (DST): UTC+02:00 (CEST)
- INSEE/Postal code: 80407 /80250
- ^{1} French Land Register data, which excludes lakes, ponds, glaciers > 1 km^{2} (0.386 sq mi or 247 acres) and river estuaries.

Hallivillers is a commune in the Somme department in Hauts-de-France in northern France.

== Geography ==
Hallivillers is situated on the D109 road, some 15 miles (24 km) south of Amiens.

== Population ==
Historical population
Year	Pop.	±% p.a.
1968	139	—
1975	110	−3.29%
1982	106	−0.53%
1990	97	−1.10%
1999	116	+2.01%
2007	131	+1.53%
2012	144	+1.91%
2017	149	+0.68%
2023	142	−0.80%
Source: INSEE

== See also ==
- Communes of the Somme department
