= Mailly-Raineval =

- Commune
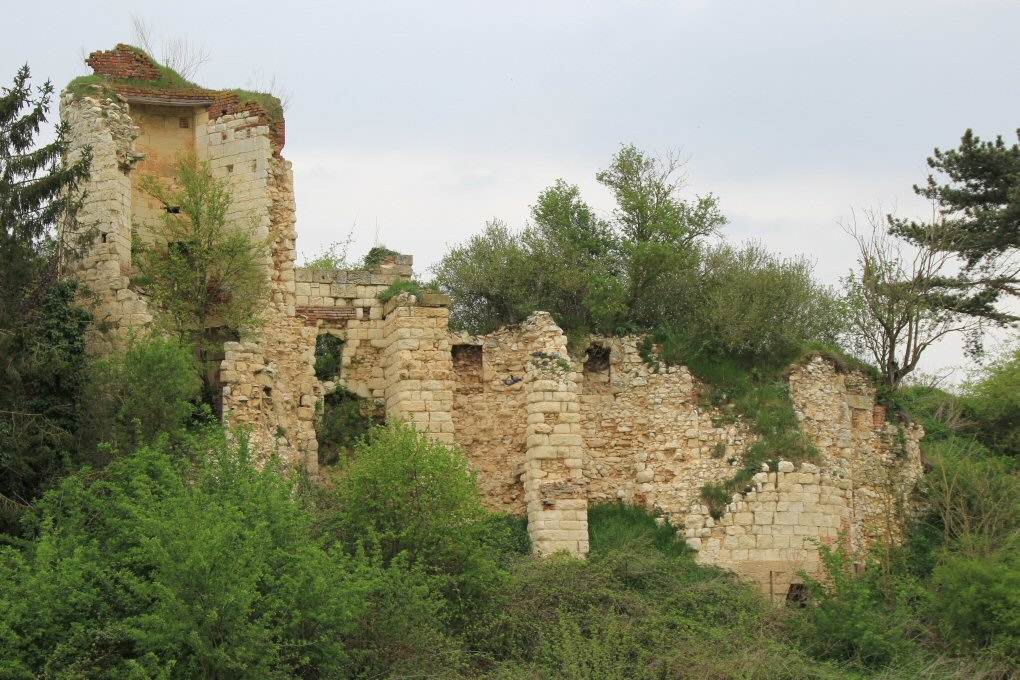
- The chateau ruins in Mailly-Raineval

- Coat of arms
- Location of Mailly-Raineval
- Location within France Location within Hauts-de-France
- Coordinates: 49°45′N 2°27′E
- Country: France
- Region: Hauts-de-France
- Department: Somme
- Arrondissement: Montdidier
- Canton: Ailly-sur-Noye
- Intercommunality: CC Avre Luce Noye

Government
  - Mayor (2020–2026): Francis Mourier
- Area^{1}: 14.3 km^{2} (5.5 sq mi)
- Elevation: 25 m (82 ft)
- Highest elevation: 115 m (377 ft)
- Lowest elevation: 39 m (128 ft)
- Population (2023): 290
  - Density: 20/km^{2} (53/sq mi)
- Time zone: UTC+01:00 (CET)
  - Summer (DST): UTC+02:00 (CEST)
- INSEE/Postal code: 80499 /80110
- ^{1} French Land Register data, which excludes lakes, ponds, glaciers > 1 km^{2} (0.386 sq mi or 247 acres) and river estuaries.

Mailly-Raineval (Picard: Mailleu-Rainevo) is a commune in the Somme department in Hauts-de-France in northern France.

== Geography ==
The commune is situated on the D14 road, some 15 miles (24 km) southeast of Amiens.

== Population ==
Historical population
Year	Pop.	±% p.a.
1968	127	—
1975	96	−3.92%
1982	111	+2.10%
1990	174	+5.78%
1999	195	+1.27%
2007	257	+3.51%
2012	256	−0.08%
2017	299	+3.15%
2023	290	−0.51%
Source: INSEE

== See also ==
- Communes of the Somme department
