= Sourdon =

- Commune
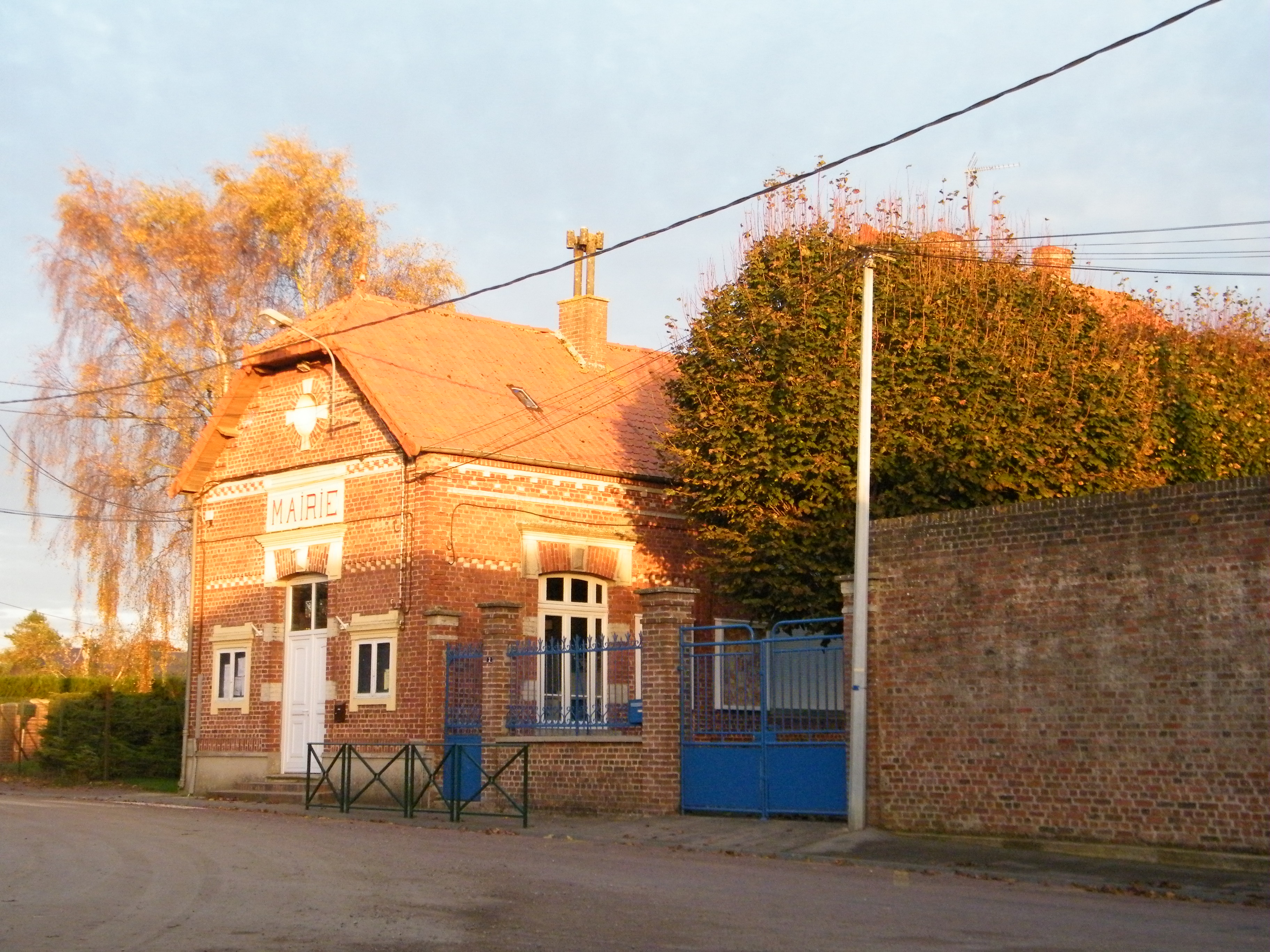
- The town hall and school in Sourdon
- Location of Sourdon
- Location within France Location within Hauts-de-France
- Coordinates: 49°42′39″N 2°23′54″E
- Country: France
- Region: Hauts-de-France
- Department: Somme
- Arrondissement: Montdidier
- Canton: Ailly-sur-Noye
- Intercommunality: CC Avre Luce Noye

Government
  - Mayor (2020–2026): Jacky Szyroki
- Area^{1}: 5.12 km^{2} (1.98 sq mi)
- Elevation: 142 m (466 ft)
- Highest elevation: 149 m (489 ft)
- Lowest elevation: 93 m (305 ft)
- Population (2023): 288
  - Density: 56.3/km^{2} (146/sq mi)
- Time zone: UTC+01:00 (CET)
  - Summer (DST): UTC+02:00 (CEST)
- INSEE/Postal code: 80740 /80250
- ^{1} French Land Register data, which excludes lakes, ponds, glaciers > 1 km^{2} (0.386 sq mi or 247 acres) and river estuaries.

Sourdon (French pronunciation: [suʁdɔ̃]; Picard: Sordon) is a commune in the Somme department in the Hauts-de-France region of France.

== Geography ==
Sourdon is situated 10 miles (16 km) south of Amiens, on the D14 road

== Population ==
Historical population
Year	Pop.	±% p.a.
1968	225	—
1975	243	+1.11%
1982	267	+1.35%
1990	264	−0.14%
1999	257	−0.30%
2007	281	+1.12%
2012	289	+0.56%
2017	325	+2.38%
2023	288	−1.99%
Source: INSEE

== See also ==
- Communes of the Somme department
