= Aubvillers =

- Commune
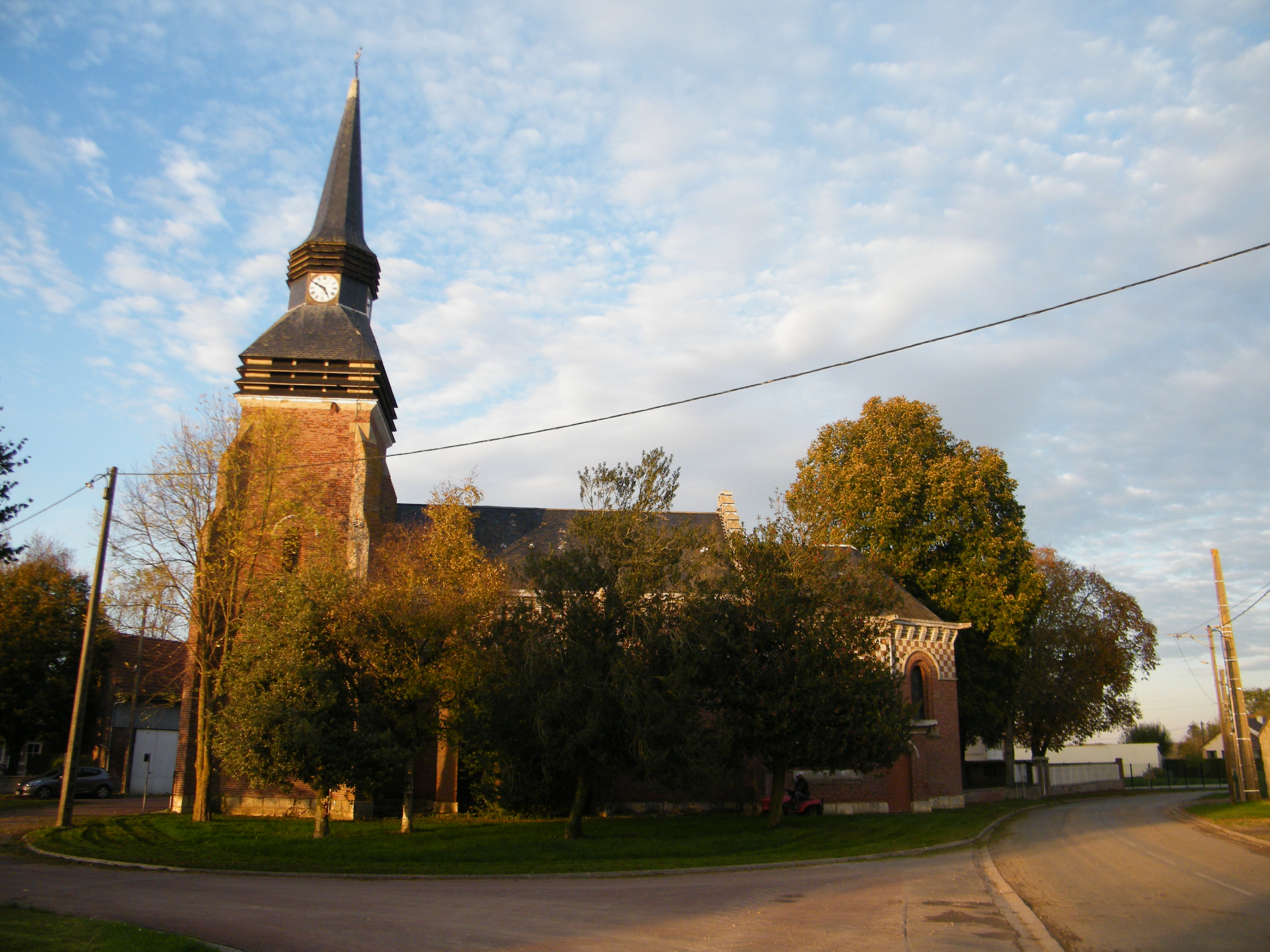
- The church in Aubvillers
- Location of Aubvillers
- Location within France Location within Hauts-de-France
- Coordinates: 49°42′51″N 2°28′59″E
- Country: France
- Region: Hauts-de-France
- Department: Somme
- Arrondissement: Montdidier
- Canton: Ailly-sur-Noye
- Intercommunality: CC Avre Luce Noye

Government
  - Mayor (2020–2026): Sergine Menard
- Area^{1}: 4.88 km^{2} (1.88 sq mi)
- Elevation: 113 m (371 ft)
- Highest elevation: 118 m (387 ft)
- Lowest elevation: 49 m (161 ft)
- Population (2023): 170
  - Density: 35/km^{2} (90/sq mi)
- Time zone: UTC+01:00 (CET)
  - Summer (DST): UTC+02:00 (CEST)
- INSEE/Postal code: 80037 /80110
- ^{1} French Land Register data, which excludes lakes, ponds, glaciers > 1 km^{2} (0.386 sq mi or 247 acres) and river estuaries.

Aubvillers is a commune in the Somme department in Hauts-de-France in northern France.

== See also ==
- Communes of the Somme department
