= Communes of the Somme department =

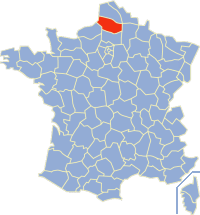

The following is a list of the 771 communes of the Somme department of France.

The communes cooperate in the following intercommunalities (as of 2025):

- Communauté d'agglomération Amiens Métropole
- Communauté d'agglomération de la Baie de Somme
- Communauté de communes interrégionale Aumale - Blangy-sur-Bresle (partly)
- Communauté de communes Avre Luce Noye
- Communauté de communes de l'Est de la Somme (partly)
- Communauté de communes du Grand Roye
- Communauté de communes de la Haute Somme
- Communauté de communes Nièvre et Somme
- Communauté de communes du Pays du Coquelicot
- Communauté de communes Ponthieu-Marquenterre
- Communauté de communes Somme Sud-Ouest
- Communauté de communes du Ternois (partly)
- Communauté de communes Terre de Picardie
- Communauté de communes du Territoire Nord Picardie
- Communauté de communes du Val de Somme
- Communauté de communes des Villes Sœurs (partly)
- Communauté de communes du Vimeu

INSEE code	Postal code	Commune
80001	80100	Abbeville
80002	80320	Ablaincourt-Pressoir
80003	80560	Acheux-en-Amiénois
80004	80210	Acheux-en-Vimeu
80005	80370	Agenville
80006	80150	Agenvillers
80008	80210	Aigneville
80009	80690	Ailly-le-Haut-Clocher
80010	80250	Ailly-sur-Noye
80011	80470	Ailly-sur-Somme
80013	80270	Airaines
80014	80240	Aizecourt-le-Bas
80015	80200	Aizecourt-le-Haut
80016	80300	Albert
80017	80200	Allaines
80018	80130	Allenay
80019	80270	Allery
80020	80260	Allonville
80021	80000	Amiens
80022	80140	Andainville
80023	80700	Andechy
80024	80730	Argœuves
80025	80120	Argoules
80026	80140	Arguel
80027	80700	Armancourt
80028	80560	Arquèves
80029	80820	Arrest
80030	80120	Arry
80031	80910	Arvillers
80032	80500	Assainvillers
80033	80200	Assevillers
80034	80200	Athies
80035	80110	Aubercourt
80036	80800	Aubigny
80037	80110	Aubvillers
80038	80560	Auchonvillers
80039	80460	Ault
80040	80140	Aumâtre
80041	80640	Aumont
80042	80600	Autheux
80043	80560	Authie
80044	80600	Authieule
80045	80300	Authuille
80046	80270	Avelesges
80047	80300	Aveluy
80048	80140	Avesnes-Chaussoy
80049	80500	Ayencourt
80050	80480	Bacouel-sur-Selle
80051	80490	Bailleul
80052	80300	Baizieux
80053	80700	Balâtre
80054	80200	Barleux
80055	80600	Barly
80056	80260	Bavelincourt
80057	80560	Bayencourt
80058	80170	Bayonvillers
80059	80300	Bazentin
80060	80370	Béalcourt
80061	80430	Beaucamps-le-Jeune
80062	80430	Beaucamps-le-Vieux
80063	80770	Beauchamps
80064	80110	Beaucourt-en-Santerre
80065	80300	Beaucourt-sur-l'Ancre
80066	80260	Beaucourt-sur-l'Hallue
80067	80170	Beaufort-en-Santerre
80068	80370	Beaumetz
80069	80300	Beaumont-Hamel
80070	80600	Beauquesne
80071	80630	Beauval
80073	80300	Bécordel-Bécourt
80074	80500	Becquigny
80076	80870	Béhen
80077	80260	Béhencourt
80078	80132	Bellancourt
80079	80160	Belleuse
80080	80200	Belloy-en-Santerre
80081	80270	Belloy-Saint-Léonard
80082	80310	Belloy-sur-Somme
80083	80290	Bergicourt
80084	80140	Bermesnil
80085	80370	Bernâtre
80086	80370	Bernaville
80087	80120	Bernay-en-Ponthieu
80088	80240	Bernes
80089	80620	Berneuil
80090	80200	Berny-en-Santerre
80092	80260	Bertangles
80093	80850	Berteaucourt-les-Dames
80094	80110	Berteaucourt-lès-Thennes
80095	80560	Bertrancourt
80096	80130	Béthencourt-sur-Mer
80097	80190	Béthencourt-sur-Somme
80098	80590	Bettembos
80099	80270	Bettencourt-Rivière
80100	80610	Bettencourt-Saint-Ouen
80101	80700	Beuvraignes
80102	80200	Biaches
80103	80190	Biarre
80104	80140	Biencourt
80105	80190	Billancourt
80106	80290	Blangy-sous-Poix
80107	80440	Blangy-Tronville
80108	80600	Boisbergues
80109	80150	Le Boisle
80110	80230	Boismont
80112	80800	Bonnay
80113	80670	Bonneville
80114	80160	Bosquel
80115	80200	Bouchavesnes-Bergen
80116	80910	Bouchoir
80117	80830	Bouchon
80118	80150	Boufflers
80119	80540	Bougainville
80120	80220	Bouillancourt-en-Séry
80121	80500	Bouillancourt-la-Bataille
80122	80600	Bouquemaison
80123	80310	Bourdon
80124	80130	Bourseville
80125	80500	Boussicourt
80126	80220	Bouttencourt
80127	80220	Bouvaincourt-sur-Bresle
80128	80200	Bouvincourt-en-Vermandois
80129	80300	Bouzincourt
80130	80540	Bovelles
80131	80440	Boves
80132	80110	Braches
80133	80150	Brailly-Cornehotte
80134	80160	Brassy
80135	80580	Bray-lès-Mareuil
80136	80340	Bray-sur-Somme
80137	80470	Breilly
80138	80300	Bresle
80139	80400	Breuil
80140	80600	Brévillers
80141	80200	Brie
80142	80540	Briquemesnil-Floxicourt
80143	80430	Brocourt
80144	80400	Brouchy
80145	80690	Brucamps
80146	80230	Brutelles
80147	80132	Buigny-l'Abbé
80148	80220	Buigny-lès-Gamaches
80149	80132	Buigny-Saint-Maclou
80150	80200	Buire-Courcelles
80151	80300	Buire-sur-l'Ancre
80152	80700	Bus-la-Mésière
80153	80560	Bus-lès-Artois
80154	80200	Bussu
80155	80135	Bussus-lès-Yaucourt
80156	80800	Bussy-lès-Daours
80157	80290	Bussy-lès-Poix
80158	80400	Buverchy
80159	80380	Cachy
80160	80330	Cagny
80161	80132	Cahon
80162	80170	Caix
80163	80132	Cambron
80164	80450	Camon
80165	80540	Camps-en-Amiénois
80166	80670	Canaples
80167	80150	Canchy
80168	80750	Candas
80169	80140	Cannessières
80170	80500	Cantigny
80171	80132	Caours
80172	80340	Cappy
80173	80260	Cardonnette
80174	80500	Le Cardonnois
80505	80300	Carnoy-Mametz
80176	80700	Carrépuis
80177	80200	Cartigny
80179	80590	Caulières
80180	80310	Cavillon
80181	80720	Cayeux-en-Santerre
80182	80410	Cayeux-sur-Mer
80184	80800	Cerisy
80183	80140	Cerisy-Buleux
80185	80700	Champien
80186	80320	Chaulnes
80187	80310	La Chaussée-Tirancourt
80188	80250	Chaussoy-Epagny
80189	80700	La Chavatte
80190	80210	Chépy
80191	80170	Chilly
80192	80800	Chipilly
80193	80250	Chirmont
80194	80340	Chuignes
80195	80340	Chuignolles
80196	80490	Citerne
80197	80200	Cizancourt
80198	80540	Clairy-Saulchoix
80199	80200	Cléry-sur-Somme
80200	80510	Cocquerel
80201	80560	Coigneux
80202	80260	Coisy
80203	80560	Colincamps
80204	80360	Combles
80205	80890	Condé-Folie
80206	80300	Contalmaison
80207	80560	Contay
80208	80370	Conteville
80210	80160	Contre
80211	80160	Conty
80212	80800	Corbie
80213	80440	Cottenchy
80214	80250	Coullemelle
80215	80135	Coulonvillers
80216	80300	Courcelette
80217	80560	Courcelles-au-Bois
80218	80290	Courcelles-sous-Moyencourt
80219	80160	Courcelles-sous-Thoix
80220	80500	Courtemanche
80221	80370	Cramont
80222	80150	Crécy-en-Ponthieu
80223	80700	Crémery
80224	80190	Cressy-Omencourt
80225	80480	Creuse
80226	80400	Croix-Moligneaux
80227	80290	Croixrault
80228	80550	Le Crotoy
80229	80310	Crouy-Saint-Pierre
80230	80190	Curchy
80231	80360	Curlu
80232	80700	Damary
80233	80700	Dancourt-Popincourt
80234	80800	Daours
80235	80570	Dargnies
80236	80500	Davenescourt
80237	80110	Démuin
80238	80300	Dernancourt
80239	80200	Devise
80240	80200	Doingt
80241	80620	Domart-en-Ponthieu
80242	80110	Domart-sur-la-Luce
80243	80370	Domesmont
80244	80120	Dominois
80245	80370	Domléger-Longvillers
80246	80440	Dommartin
80247	80980	Dompierre-Becquincourt
80248	80150	Dompierre-sur-Authie
80249	80620	Domqueur
80250	80150	Domvast
80251	80140	Doudelainville
80252	80400	Douilly
80253	80600	Doullens
80256	80730	Dreuil-lès-Amiens
80258	80240	Driencourt
80259	80640	Dromesnil
80260	80132	Drucat
80261	80480	Dury
80262	80580	Eaucourt-sur-Somme
80263	80700	L'Échelle-Saint-Aurin
80264	80340	Éclusier-Vaux
80265	80570	Embreville
80266	80300	Englebelmer
80267	80200	Ennemain
80268	80580	Épagne-Épagnette
80269	80140	Épaumesnil
80270	80370	Épécamps
80271	80740	Épehy
80272	80190	Épénancourt
80273	80290	Éplessier
80274	80400	Eppeville
80275	80360	Équancourt
80276	80290	Équennes-Éramecourt
80278	80500	Erches
80279	80400	Ercheu
80280	80210	Ercourt
80281	80690	Ergnies
80282	80580	Érondelle
80283	80250	Esclainvillers
80284	80400	Esmery-Hallon
80285	80160	Essertaux
80287	80230	Estrébœuf
80288	80200	Estrées-Deniécourt
80290	80150	Estrées-lès-Crécy
80557	80200	Estrées-Mons
80291	80250	Estrées-sur-Noye
80292	80190	Étalon
80293	80500	Ételfay
80294	80200	Éterpigny
80295	80340	Étinehem-Méricourt
80296	80830	L'Étoile
80297	80140	Étréjust
80298	80360	Étricourt-Manancourt
80299	80250	La Faloise
80300	80190	Falvy
80301	80290	Famechon
80302	80500	Faverolles
80303	80120	Favières
80304	80200	Fay
80305	80470	Ferrières
80306	80500	Fescamps
80307	80200	Feuillères
80308	80210	Feuquières-en-Vimeu
80566	80670	Fieffes-Montrelet
80310	80750	Fienvillers
80311	80500	Fignières
80312	80360	Fins
80313	80200	Flaucourt
80314	80360	Flers
80315	80160	Flers-sur-Noye
80316	80260	Flesselles
80317	80160	Fleury
80318	80420	Flixecourt
80319	80540	Fluy
80320	80170	Folies
80321	80250	Folleville
80322	80700	Fonches-Fonchette
80325	80340	Fontaine-lès-Cappy
80324	80140	Fontaine-le-Sec
80326	80500	Fontaine-sous-Montdidier
80327	80150	Fontaine-sur-Maye
80328	80510	Fontaine-sur-Somme
80329	80560	Forceville
80330	80140	Forceville-en-Vimeu
80331	80150	Forest-l'Abbaye
80332	80120	Forest-Montiers
80333	80790	Fort-Mahon-Plage
80334	80160	Fossemanant
80335	80340	Foucaucourt-en-Santerre
80336	80140	Foucaucourt-Hors-Nesle
80337	80440	Fouencamps
80338	80800	Fouilloy
80339	80170	Fouquescourt
80340	80590	Fourcigny
80341	80310	Fourdrinoy
80342	80131	Framerville-Rainecourt
80343	80140	Framicourt
80344	80690	Francières
80345	80210	Franleu
80346	80620	Franqueville
80347	80700	Fransart
80348	80620	Fransu
80349	80160	Fransures
80350	80800	Franvillers
80351	80260	Fréchencourt
80352	80160	Frémontiers
80353	80320	Fresnes-Mazancourt
80354	80140	Fresnes-Tilloloy
80355	80140	Fresneville
80356	80140	Fresnoy-Andainville
80357	80710	Fresnoy-au-Val
80358	80110	Fresnoy-en-Chaussée
80359	80700	Fresnoy-lès-Roye
80360	80390	Fressenneville
80361	80140	Frettecuisse
80362	80220	Frettemeule
80364	80460	Friaucourt
80365	80290	Fricamps
80366	80300	Fricourt
80367	80340	Frise
80368	80130	Friville-Escarbotin
80369	80370	Frohen-sur-Authie
80371	80150	Froyelles
80372	80490	Frucourt
80373	80220	Gamaches
80374	80150	Gapennes
80375	80590	Gauville
80376	80380	Gentelles
80377	80600	Gézaincourt
80378	80360	Ginchy
80379	80440	Glisy
80380	80690	Gorenflos
80381	80370	Gorges
80383	80700	Goyencourt
80384	80300	Grandcourt
80385	80132	Grand-Laviers
80386	80500	Gratibus
80387	80680	Grattepanche
80388	80140	Grébault-Mesnil
80390	80250	Grivesnes
80391	80700	Grivillers
80392	80600	Grouches-Luchuel
80393	80700	Gruny
80395	80500	Guerbigny
80396	80150	Gueschart
80397	80360	Gueudecourt
80399	80540	Guignemicourt
80400	80170	Guillaucourt
80401	80360	Guillemont
80402	80290	Guizancourt
80404	80240	Guyencourt-Saulcourt
80403	80250	Guyencourt-sur-Noye
80405	80440	Hailles
80406	80490	Hallencourt
80407	80250	Hallivillers
80408	80670	Halloy-lès-Pernois
80409	80320	Hallu

INSEE code	Postal code	Commune
80410	80400	Ham
80411	80800	Le Hamel
80412	80800	Hamelet
80413	80240	Hancourt
80414	80110	Hangard
80415	80134	Hangest-en-Santerre
80416	80310	Hangest-sur-Somme
80417	80131	Harbonnières
80418	80360	Hardecourt-aux-Bois
80420	80560	Harponville
80421	80700	Hattencourt
80422	80132	Hautvillers-Ouville
80423	80670	Havernas
80424	80680	Hébécourt
80425	80560	Hédauville
80426	80113	Heilly
80427	80600	Hem-Hardinval
80428	80360	Hem-Monacu
80429	80300	Hénencourt
80430	80200	Herbécourt
80431	80260	Hérissart
80432	80340	Herleville
80433	80190	Herly
80434	80240	Hervilly
80435	80240	Hesbécourt
80436	80290	Hescamps
80437	80270	Heucourt-Croquoison
80438	80122	Heudicourt
80439	80370	Heuzecourt
80440	80370	Hiermont
80442	80400	Hombleux
80443	80640	Hornoy-le-Bourg
80444	80132	Huchenneville
80445	80600	Humbercourt
80446	80140	Huppy
80621	80320	Hypercourt
80449	80720	Ignaucourt
80450	80430	Inval-Boiron
80451	80300	Irles
80452	80250	Jumel
80453	80500	Laboissière-en-Santerre
80455	80290	Lachapelle
80456	80430	Lafresguimont-Saint-Martin
80458	80800	Lahoussoye
80459	80270	Laleu
80460	80590	Lamaronde
80461	80450	Lamotte-Brebière
80462	80150	Lamotte-Buleux
80463	80720	Lamotte-Warfusée
80464	80230	Lanchères
80466	80620	Lanches-Saint-Hilaire
80465	80190	Languevoisin-Quiquery
80467	80700	Laucourt
80468	80300	Laviéville
80469	80250	Lawarde-Mauger-l'Hortoy
80470	80560	Léalvillers
80472	80360	Lesbœufs
80473	80700	Liancourt-Fosse
80474	80320	Licourt
80475	80240	Liéramont
80476	80580	Liercourt
80477	80150	Ligescourt
80478	80500	Lignières
80479	80590	Lignières-Châtelain
80480	80140	Lignières-en-Vimeu
80481	80320	Lihons
80482	80490	Limieux
80484	80430	Liomer
80486	80510	Long
80487	80240	Longavesnes
80488	80510	Longpré-les-Corps-Saints
80489	80330	Longueau
80490	80360	Longueval
80491	80600	Longuevillette
80493	80560	Louvencourt
80494	80250	Louvrechy
80495	80600	Lucheux
80496	80150	Machiel
80497	80150	Machy
80498	80560	Mailly-Maillet
80499	80110	Mailly-Raineval
80500	80220	Maisnières
80501	80150	Maison-Ponthieu
80502	80135	Maison-Roland
80503	80370	Maizicourt
80504	80250	Malpart
80507	80720	Marcelcave
80508	80700	Marché-Allouarde
80509	80200	Marchélepot-Misery
80511	80500	Marestmontiers
80512	80132	Mareuil-Caubert
80513	80360	Maricourt
80514	80560	Marieux
80515	80590	Marlers
80516	80240	Marquaix
80517	80700	Marquivillers
80518	80140	Martainneville
80519	80400	Matigny
80520	80170	Maucourt
80521	80360	Maurepas
80522	80430	Le Mazis
80523	80810	Méaulte
80524	80170	Méharicourt
80525	80590	Meigneux
80526	80370	Le Meillard
80527	80520	Méneslies
80528	80290	Méréaucourt
80529	80490	Mérélessart
80531	80640	Méricourt-en-Vimeu
80530	80113	Méricourt-l'Abbé
80533	80350	Mers-les-Bains
80535	80310	Le Mesge
80536	80200	Mesnil-Bruntel
80537	80620	Mesnil-Domqueur
80538	80360	Mesnil-en-Arrouaise
80540	80300	Mesnil-Martinsart
80541	80500	Mesnil-Saint-Georges
80542	80190	Mesnil-Saint-Nicaise
80543	80270	Métigny
80544	80600	Mézerolles
80545	80110	Mézières-en-Santerre
80546	80132	Miannay
80547	80300	Millencourt
80548	80135	Millencourt-en-Ponthieu
80549	80300	Miraumont
80550	80260	Mirvaux
80552	80760	Moislains
80553	80260	Molliens-au-Bois
80554	80540	Molliens-Dreuil
80555	80200	Monchy-Lagache
80556	80210	Mons-Boubert
80558	80160	Monsures
80559	80540	Montagne-Fayel
80560	80300	Montauban-de-Picardie
80561	80500	Montdidier
80563	80370	Montigny-les-Jongleurs
80562	80260	Montigny-sur-l'Hallue
80565	80260	Montonvillers
80568	80190	Morchain
80569	80340	Morcourt
80570	80110	Moreuil
80571	80110	Morisel
80572	80300	Morlancourt
80573	80590	Morvillers-Saint-Saturnin
80574	80690	Mouflers
80575	80140	Mouflières
80576	80400	Moyencourt
80577	80290	Moyencourt-lès-Poix
80578	80870	Moyenneville
80579	80400	Muille-Villette
80580	80120	Nampont
80582	80710	Namps-Maisnil
80583	80160	Nampty
80584	80260	Naours
80585	80190	Nesle
80586	80140	Nesle-l'Hôpital
80587	80140	Neslette
80588	80132	Neufmoulin
80589	80150	Neuilly-le-Dien
80590	80132	Neuilly-l'Hôpital
80591	80140	Neuville-au-Bois
80592	80430	Neuville-Coppegueule
80593	80340	La Neuville-lès-Bray
80595	80110	La Neuville-Sire-Bernard
80596	80600	Neuvillette
80597	80390	Nibas
80598	80860	Nouvion
80599	80150	Noyelles-en-Chaussée
80600	80860	Noyelles-sur-Mer
80601	80240	Nurlu
80602	80600	Occoches
80603	80210	Ochancourt
80485	80160	Ô-de-Selle
80604	80590	Offignies
80605	80400	Offoy
80606	80140	Oisemont
80607	80540	Oissy
80609	80135	Oneux
80611	80160	Oresmaux
80613	80460	Oust-Marest
80614	80600	Outrebois
80615	80300	Ovillers-la-Boisselle
80616	80190	Pargny
80617	80700	Parvillers-le-Quesnoy
80618	80230	Pendé
80619	80670	Pernois
80620	80200	Péronne
80622	80310	Picquigny
80623	80500	Piennes-Onvillers
80624	80260	Pierregot
80626	80540	Pissy
80627	80160	Plachy-Buyon
80628	80110	Le Plessier-Rozainvillers
80629	80240	Pœuilly
80630	80290	Poix-de-Picardie
80631	80150	Ponches-Estruval
80632	80480	Pont-de-Metz
80633	80860	Ponthoile
80634	80115	Pont-Noyelles
80635	80580	Pont-Remy
80637	80132	Port-le-Grand
80638	80190	Potte
80639	80260	Poulainville
80640	80300	Pozières
80642	80370	Prouville
80643	80160	Prouzel
80644	80340	Proyart
80645	80560	Puchevillers
80646	80320	Punchy
80647	80320	Puzeaux
80648	80300	Pys
80649	80120	Quend
80650	80115	Querrieu
80651	80430	Le Quesne
80652	80118	Le Quesnel
80654	80132	Quesnoy-le-Montant
80655	80270	Quesnoy-sur-Airaines
80656	80710	Quevauvillers
80657	80250	Quiry-le-Sec
80658	80400	Quivières
80659	80600	Raincheval
80661	80260	Rainneville
80662	80140	Ramburelles
80663	80140	Rambures
80664	80360	Rancourt
80665	80120	Regnière-Écluse
80666	80600	Remaisnil
80667	80500	Remaugies
80668	80250	Remiencourt
80669	80700	Rethonvillers
80670	80540	Revelles
80671	80620	Ribeaucourt
80672	80113	Ribemont-sur-Ancre
80673	80310	Riencourt
80674	80136	Rivery
80675	80160	Rogy
80676	80700	Roiglise
80677	80240	Roisel
80678	80500	Rollot
80679	80740	Ronssoy
80680	80170	Rosières-en-Santerre
80681	80250	Rouvrel
80682	80170	Rouvroy-en-Santerre
80683	80190	Rouy-le-Grand
80684	80190	Rouy-le-Petit
80685	80700	Roye
80686	80260	Rubempré
80687	80500	Rubescourt
80688	80120	Rue
80690	80680	Rumigny
80691	80230	Saigneville
80692	80970	Sailly-Flibeaucourt
80693	80800	Sailly-Laurette
80694	80800	Sailly-le-Sec
80695	80360	Sailly-Saillisel
80696	80680	Sains-en-Amiénois
80697	80370	Saint-Acheul
80698	80540	Saint-Aubin-Montenoy
80699	80430	Saint-Aubin-Rivière
80700	80960	Saint-Blimont
80701	80200	Saint-Christ-Briost
80719	80290	Sainte-Segrée
80702	80680	Saint-Fuscien
80703	80430	Saint-Germain-sur-Bresle
80704	80260	Saint-Gratien
80705	80560	Saint-Léger-lès-Authie
80706	80780	Saint-Léger-lès-Domart
80707	80140	Saint-Léger-sur-Bresle
80708	80700	Saint-Mard
80709	80140	Saint-Maulvis
80710	80140	Saint-Maxent
80711	80610	Saint-Ouen
80713	80120	Saint-Quentin-en-Tourmont
80714	80880	Saint-Quentin-la-Motte-Croix-au-Bailly
80716	80135	Saint-Riquier
80717	80160	Saint-Sauflieu
80718	80470	Saint-Sauveur
80722	80310	Saint-Vaast-en-Chaussée
80721	80230	Saint-Valery-sur-Somme
80723	80540	Saisseval
80724	80480	Saleux
80725	80480	Salouël
80726	80400	Sancourt
80728	80290	Saulchoy-sous-Poix
80729	80110	Sauvillers-Mongival
80730	80730	Saveuse
80732	80140	Senarpont
80733	80300	Senlis-le-Sec
80734	80160	Sentelie
80735	80540	Seux
80737	80240	Sorel
80736	80490	Sorel-en-Vimeu
80738	80310	Soues
80740	80250	Sourdon
80741	80200	Soyécourt
80742	80620	Surcamps
80743	80340	Suzanne
80744	80270	Tailly
80746	80260	Talmas
80747	80240	Templeux-la-Fosse
80748	80240	Templeux-le-Guérard
80749	80600	Terramesnil
80750	80200	Tertry
80751	80110	Thennes
80752	80440	Thézy-Glimont
80753	80300	Thiepval
80754	80640	Thieulloy-l'Abbaye
80755	80290	Thieulloy-la-Ville
80756	62760	Thièvres
80757	80160	Thoix
80758	80250	Thory
80759	80700	Tilloloy
80760	80220	Tilloy-Floriville
80762	80240	Tincourt-Boucly
80763	80132	Le Titre
80764	80870	Tœufles
80765	80210	Tours-en-Vimeu
80766	80560	Toutencourt
80767	80140	Le Translay
80769	80300	Treux
80625	80500	Trois-Rivières
80770	80130	Tully
80771	80400	Ugny-l'Équipée
80773	80560	Vadencourt
80774	80800	Vaire-sous-Corbie
80775	80210	Valines
80776	80560	Varennes
80777	80560	Vauchelles-lès-Authie
80778	80620	Vauchelles-lès-Domart
80779	80132	Vauchelles-les-Quesnoy
80780	80230	Vaudricourt
80781	80131	Vauvillers
80782	80260	Vaux-en-Amiénois
80783	80140	Vaux-Marquenneville
80784	80800	Vaux-sur-Somme
80785	80800	Vecquemont
80786	80160	Velennes
80787	80120	Vercourt
80788	80270	Vergies
80789	80320	Vermandovillers
80790	80700	Verpillières
80791	80480	Vers-sur-Selle
80792	80260	La Vicogne
80793	80650	Vignacourt
80794	80190	Villecourt
80795	80420	Ville-le-Marclet
80796	80140	Villeroy
80797	80110	Villers-aux-Érables
80798	80260	Villers-Bocage
80799	80380	Villers-Bretonneux
80800	80140	Villers-Campsart
80801	80200	Villers-Carbonnel
80802	80112	Villers-Faucon
80803	80700	Villers-lès-Roye
80804	80690	Villers-sous-Ailly
80806	80120	Villers-sur-Authie
80805	80500	Villers-Tournelle
80807	80300	Ville-sur-Ancre
80808	80150	Vironchaux
80809	80140	Vismes
80810	80150	Vitz-sur-Authie
80811	80400	Voyennes
80812	80240	Vraignes-en-Vermandois
80813	80640	Vraignes-lès-Hornoy
80814	80170	Vrély
80815	80120	Vron
80819	80670	Wargnies
80820	80300	Warloy-Baillon
80821	80270	Warlus
80822	80500	Warsy
80823	80170	Warvillers
80824	80170	Wiencourt-l'Équipée
80825	80270	Wiry-au-Mont
80826	80460	Woignarue
80827	80520	Woincourt
80828	80140	Woirel
80829	80190	Y
80836	80132	Yonval
80832	80150	Yvrench
80833	80150	Yvrencheux
80834	80520	Yzengremer
80835	80310	Yzeux
