= Communauté de communes Avre Luce Noye =

Federation of municipalities in France

Avre Luce Noye
- Communauté de communes
- Interactive map of Avre Luce Noye
- Coordinates: 49°47′N 02°29′E
- Country: France
- Region: Hauts-de-France
- Department: Somme
- No. of communes: {{{nbcomm}}}
- Established: 2017
- Area: 385.2 km^{2} (148.7 sq mi)
- Population (2019): 21,883
  - Density: 56.81/km^{2} (147.1/sq mi)

The Communauté de communes Avre Luce Noye is a communauté de communes in the Somme département and in the Hauts-de-France région of France. It was formed on 1 January 2017 by the merger of the former Communauté de communes Avre Luce Moreuil and the Communauté de communes du Val de Noye. Its seat is in Moreuil. Its area is 385.2 km^{2}, and its population was 21,883 in 2019.

== Composition ==
The communauté de communes consists of the following 47 communes:

1. Ailly-sur-Noye
2. Arvillers
3. Aubercourt
4. Aubvillers
5. Beaucourt-en-Santerre
6. Berteaucourt-lès-Thennes
7. Braches
8. Cayeux-en-Santerre
9. Chaussoy-Epagny
10. Chirmont
11. Cottenchy
12. Coullemelle
13. Démuin
14. Domart-sur-la-Luce
15. Dommartin
16. Esclainvillers
17. La Faloise
18. Flers-sur-Noye
19. Folleville
20. Fouencamps
21. Fransures
22. Fresnoy-en-Chaussée
23. Grivesnes
24. Guyencourt-sur-Noye
25. Hailles
26. Hallivillers
27. Hangard
28. Hangest-en-Santerre
29. Ignaucourt
30. Jumel
31. Lawarde-Mauger-l'Hortoy
32. Louvrechy
33. Mailly-Raineval
34. Mézières-en-Santerre
35. Moreuil
36. Morisel
37. La Neuville-Sire-Bernard
38. Le Plessier-Rozainvillers
39. Le Quesnel
40. Quiry-le-Sec
41. Rogy
42. Rouvrel
43. Sauvillers-Mongival
44. Sourdon
45. Thennes
46. Thory
47. Villers-aux-Érables
