= Rogy =

- Commune
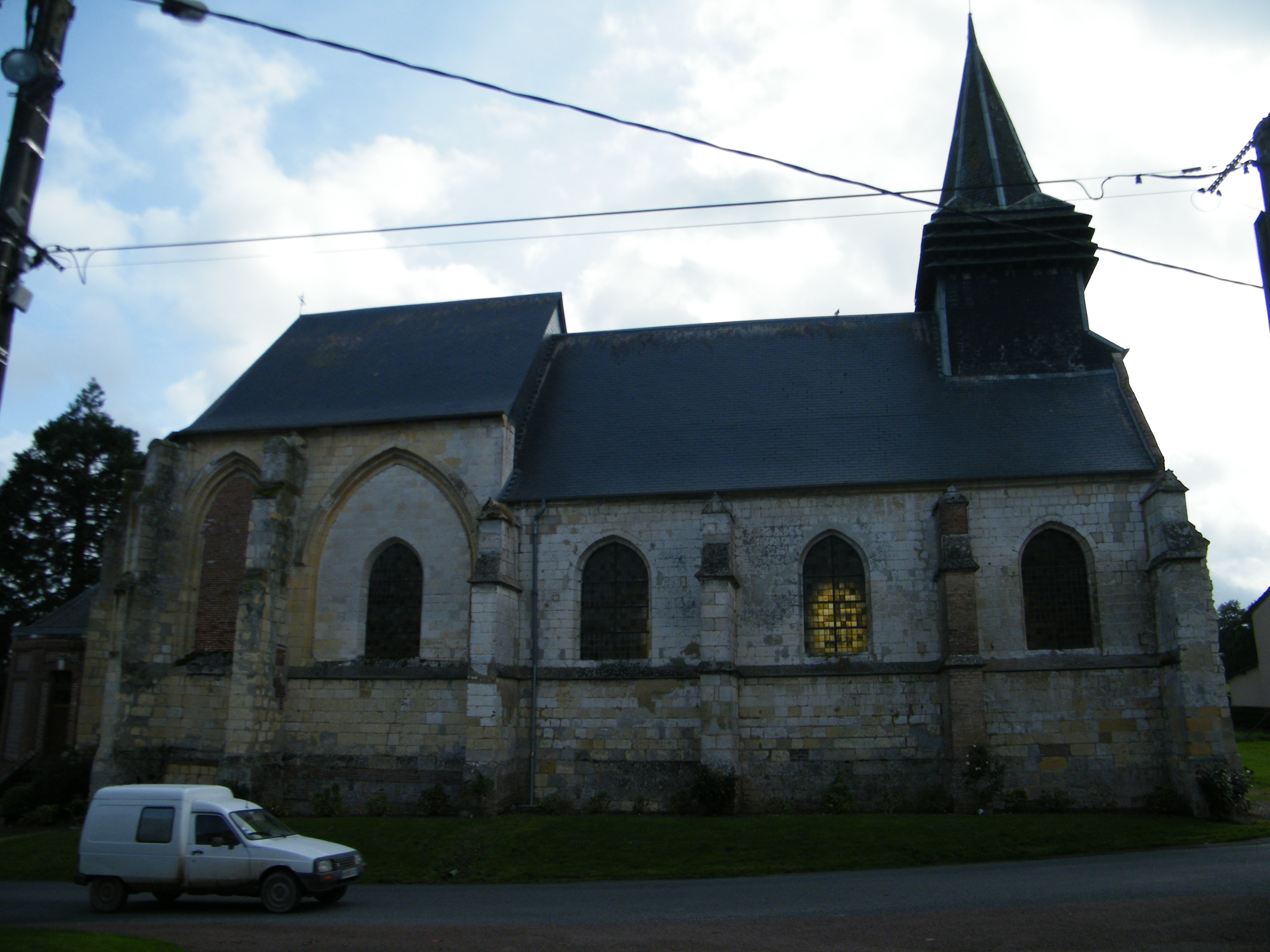
- The church in Rogy
- Location of Rogy
- Location within France Location within Hauts-de-France
- Coordinates: 49°42′42″N 2°12′34″E
- Country: France
- Region: Hauts-de-France
- Department: Somme
- Arrondissement: Montdidier
- Canton: Ailly-sur-Noye
- Intercommunality: CC Avre Luce Noye

Government
  - Mayor (2020–2026): Michel Mianne
- Area^{1}: 6.77 km^{2} (2.61 sq mi)
- Elevation: 160 m (520 ft)
- Highest elevation: 167 m (548 ft)
- Lowest elevation: 98 m (322 ft)
- Population (2023): 149
  - Density: 22.0/km^{2} (57.0/sq mi)
- Time zone: UTC+01:00 (CET)
  - Summer (DST): UTC+02:00 (CEST)
- INSEE/Postal code: 80675 /80160
- ^{1} French Land Register data, which excludes lakes, ponds, glaciers > 1 km^{2} (0.386 sq mi or 247 acres) and river estuaries.

Rogy (French pronunciation: [ʁɔʒi]; Picard: Rougy) is a commune in the Somme department in Hauts-de-France in northern France.

== Geography ==
Rogy is situated 11 miles (18 km) south of Amiens, on the D109 road

== Population ==
Historical population
| Year | Pop. | ±% p.a. |
|---|---|---|
| 1968 | 79 | — |
| 1975 | 74 | −0.93% |
| 1982 | 76 | +0.38% |
| 1990 | 82 | +0.95% |
| 1999 | 94 | +1.53% |
| 2007 | 140 | +5.11% |
| 2012 | 139 | −0.14% |
| 2017 | 126 | −1.94% |
| 2023 | 149 | +2.83% |
Source: INSEE

== See also ==
- Communes of the Somme department
