= Noye =

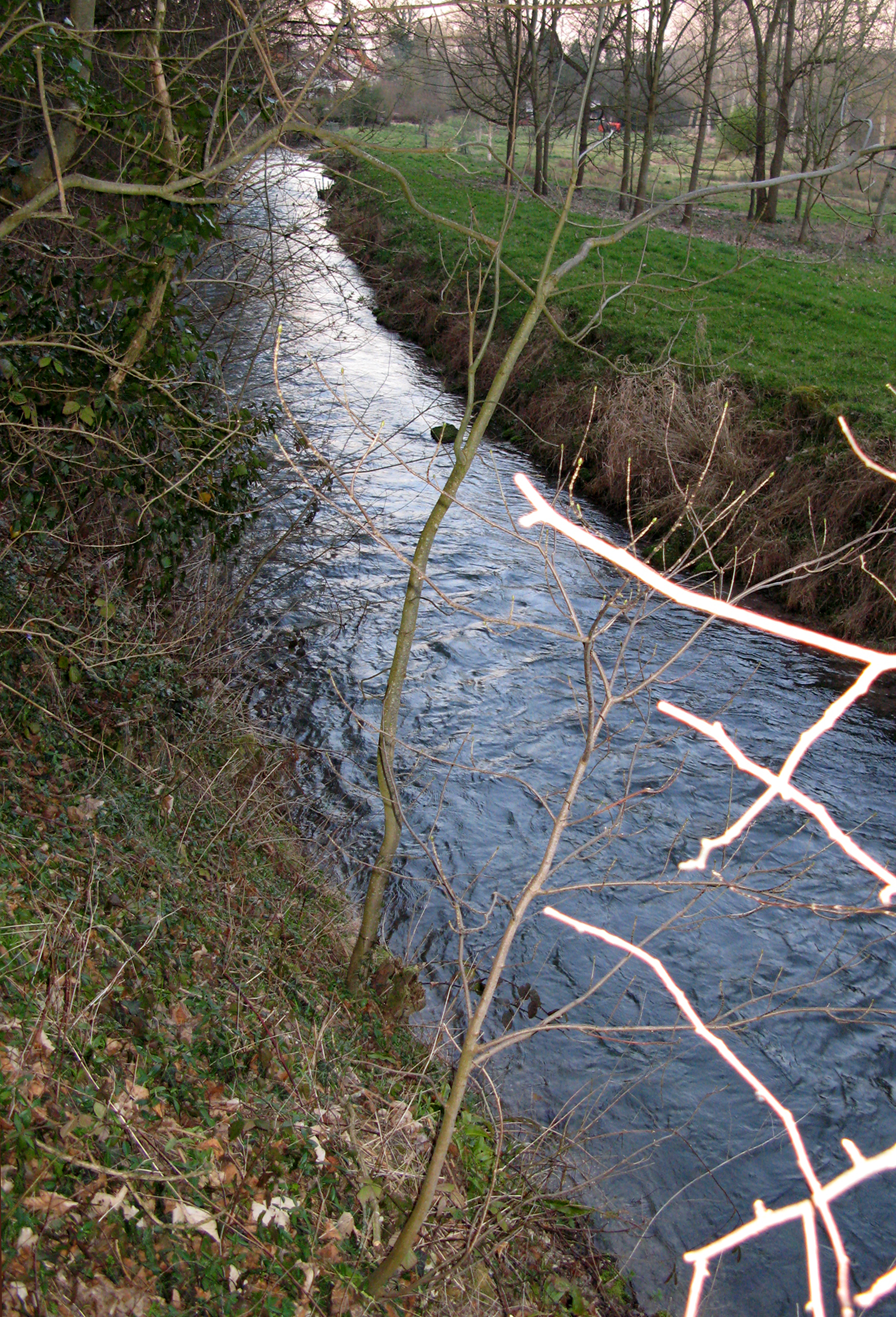

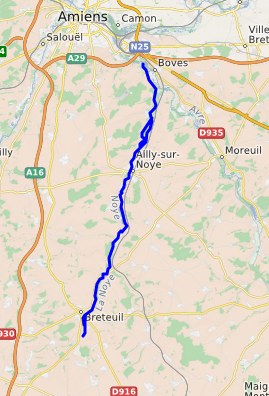
- Course of the Noye
- Native name: Noée (Picard)

Location
- Country: France

Physical characteristics
- Mouth
  - location: Avre
  - coordinates: 49°51′8″N 2°22′44″E
- Length: 33 km (21 mi)

Basin features
- Progression: Avre→ Somme→ English Channel

The Noye (French pronunciation: [nwa]; Picard: Noée) is a river in the Hauts-de-France region of northern France.

The Noye is located in the northern part of the Picard plateau. It is the left tributary of the Avre river, which is itself a left tributary of the Somme. The Noye starts near the commune of Vendeuil-Caply and extends to a length of 33 kilometres (21 mi). It flows through the departments of Oise and Somme at Breteuil and Ailly-sur-Noye, entering the Avre at Boves, 9 kilometres (5.6 mi) southeast of Amiens.
