= Communauté de communes du canton de Montdidier =

Coordinates: 49.6486°N 2.5701°E

canton de Montdidier
- Former communauté de communes
- Interactive map of canton de Montdidier
- Country: France
- Region: Hauts-de-France
- Department: Somme
- No. of communes: {{{nbcomm}}}
- Established: 2000
- Disbanded: 2017
- Area: 213.66 km^{2} (82.49 sq mi)
- Population (1999): 11,969
  - Density: 56.019/km^{2} (145.09/sq mi)

The Communauté de communes du canton de Montdidier is a former communauté de communes in the Somme département and in the Picardie région of France. It was created in December 2000. It was merged into the Communauté de communes du Grand Roye in January 2017.

== Composition ==
This Communauté de communes comprised 34 communes:

1. Andechy
2. Assainvillers
3. Ayencourt
4. Becquigny
5. Bouillancourt-la-Bataille
6. Boussicourt
7. Bus-la-Mésière
8. Cantigny
9. Le Cardonnois
10. Courtemanche
11. Davenescourt
12. Erches
13. Ételfay
14. Faverolles
15. Fescamps
16. Fignières
17. Fontaine-sous-Montdidier
18. Gratibus
19. Grivillers
20. Guerbigny
21. Hargicourt
22. Laboissière-en-Santerre
23. Lignières
24. Malpart
25. Marestmontiers
26. Marquivillers
27. Mesnil-Saint-Georges
28. Montdidier
29. Piennes-Onvillers
30. Remaugies
31. Rollot
32. Rubescourt
33. Villers-Tournelle
34. Warsy

== See also ==
- Communes of the Somme department
