= Etalon (disambiguation) =

Etalon is an optical device with parallel mirrors.

It may also refer to:

- Étalon, Somme, a French commune
- Etalon (metrology), a reference standard
- Etalon (satellite), an artificial satellite
