= Saint-Mard, Somme =

Saint-Mard
- Commune
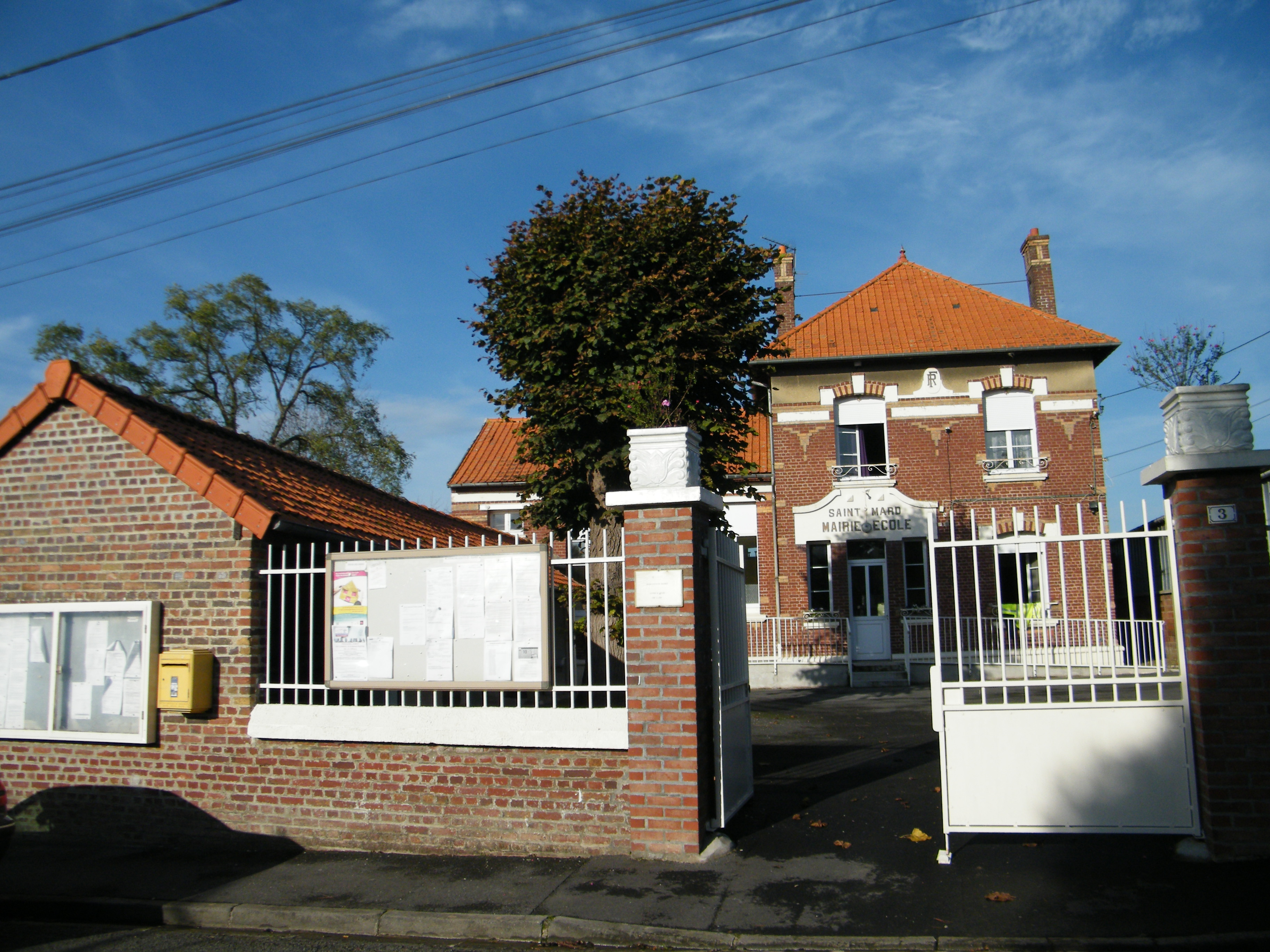
- The town hall and school in Saint-Mard
- Location of Saint-Mard
- Location within France Location within Hauts-de-France
- Coordinates: 49°41′38″N 2°45′49″E
- Country: France
- Region: Hauts-de-France
- Department: Somme
- Arrondissement: Montdidier
- Canton: Roye
- Intercommunality: CC Grand Roye

Government
  - Mayor (2020–2026): Anne Leroyer
- Area^{1}: 4.15 km^{2} (1.60 sq mi)
- Elevation: 70 m (230 ft)
- Highest elevation: 95 m (312 ft)
- Lowest elevation: 62 m (203 ft)
- Population (2023): 155
  - Density: 37.3/km^{2} (96.7/sq mi)
- Time zone: UTC+01:00 (CET)
  - Summer (DST): UTC+02:00 (CEST)
- INSEE/Postal code: 80708 /80700
- ^{1} French Land Register data, which excludes lakes, ponds, glaciers > 1 km^{2} (0.386 sq mi or 247 acres) and river estuaries.

Saint-Mard (French pronunciation: [sɛ̃ maʁ]) is a commune in the Somme department in Hauts-de-France in northern France.

== Geography ==
The commune is situated some 25 miles (40 km) southeast of Amiens, on the D54a road

== Population ==
Historical population
Year	Pop.	±% p.a.
1968	114	—
1975	124	+1.21%
1982	121	−0.35%
1990	167	+4.11%
1999	193	+1.62%
2007	191	−0.13%
2012	196	+0.52%
2017	165	−3.38%
2023	155	−1.04%
Source: INSEE

== See also ==
- Communes of the Somme department
