= Hattencourt =

- Commune
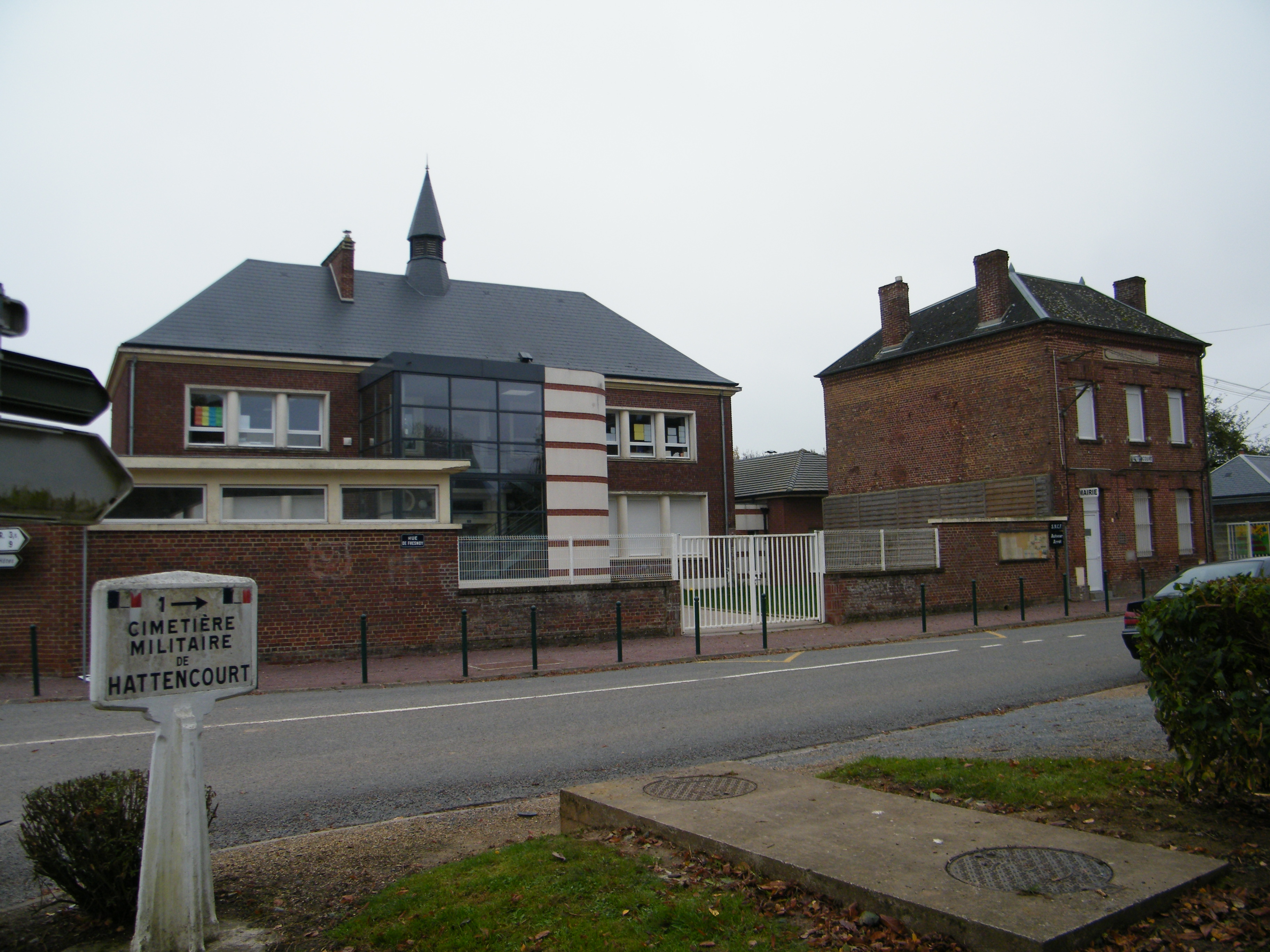
- The town hall in Hattencourt
- Location of Hattencourt
- Location within France Location within Hauts-de-France
- Coordinates: 49°46′12″N 2°47′20″E
- Country: France
- Region: Hauts-de-France
- Department: Somme
- Arrondissement: Montdidier
- Canton: Roye
- Intercommunality: CC Grand Roye

Government
  - Mayor (2020–2026): Sébastien Rubigny
- Area^{1}: 3.61 km^{2} (1.39 sq mi)
- Elevation: 86 m (282 ft)
- Highest elevation: 92 m (302 ft)
- Lowest elevation: 78 m (256 ft)
- Population (2023): 302
  - Density: 83.7/km^{2} (217/sq mi)
- Time zone: UTC+01:00 (CET)
  - Summer (DST): UTC+02:00 (CEST)
- INSEE/Postal code: 80421 /80700
- ^{1} French Land Register data, which excludes lakes, ponds, glaciers > 1 km^{2} (0.386 sq mi or 247 acres) and river estuaries.

Hattencourt (French pronunciation: [atɑ̃kuʁ]) is a commune in the Somme department in Hauts-de-France in northern France.

== Geography ==
Hattencourt is situated on the D161 and D132 crossroads and about 100 yards from the A1 autoroute, some 30 miles (48 km) southeast of Amiens.

== History ==
The village was first mentioned in the 14th century. It was razed to the ground by the troops of Henri de la Tour d'Auvergne, Vicomte de Turenne in 1636.
As with many villages of the Somme, it was ruined by the bombardments of the First World War.

== Population ==
Historical population
Year	Pop.	±% p.a.
1968	263	—
1975	241	−1.24%
1982	242	+0.06%
1990	224	−0.96%
1999	237	+0.63%
2007	245	+0.42%
2012	272	+2.11%
2017	291	+1.36%
2023	302	+0.62%
Source: INSEE

== See also ==
- Communes of the Somme department
