= Carrépuis =

- Commune
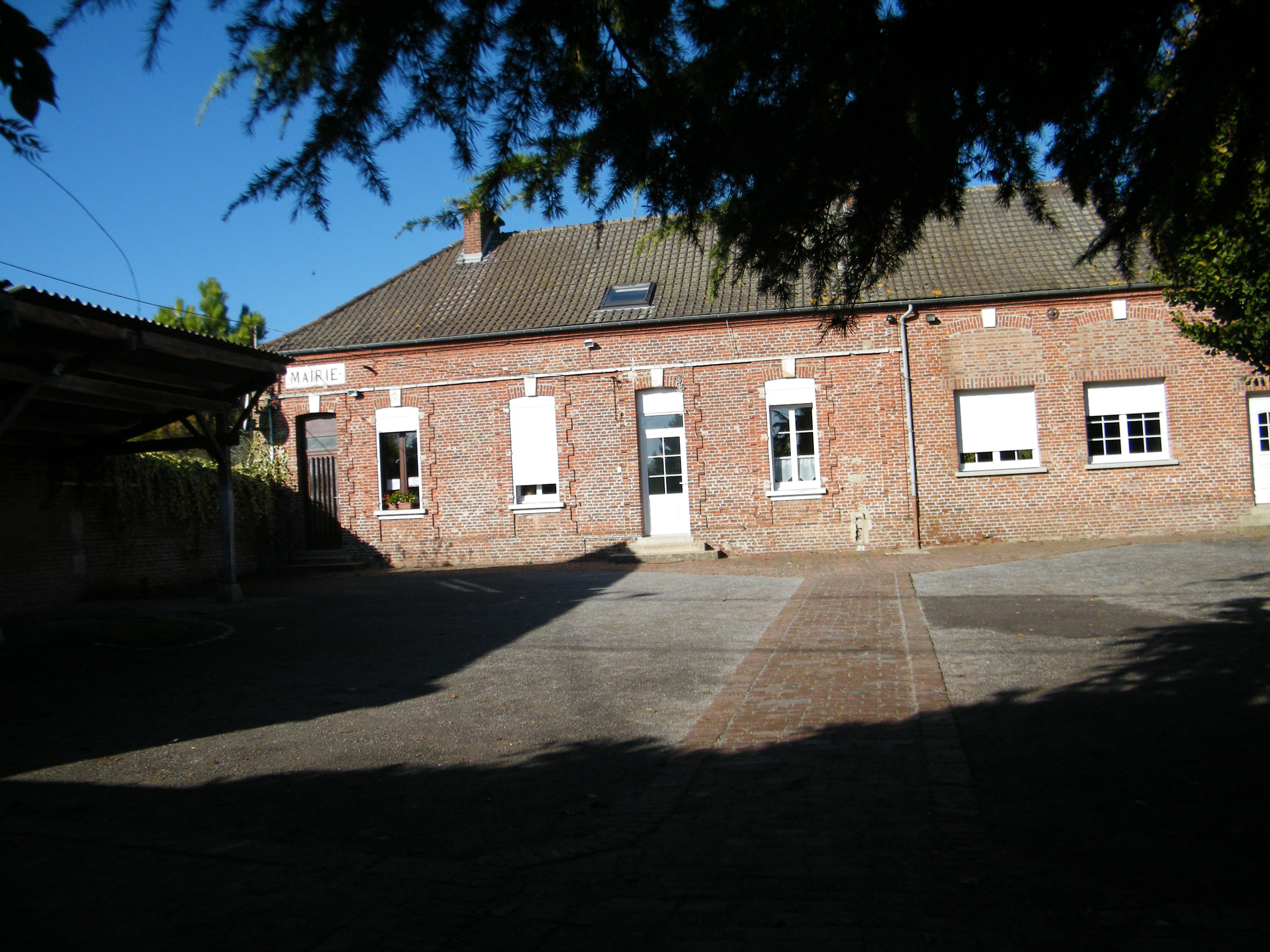
- The town hall in Carrépuis
- Location of Carrépuis
- Location within France Location within Hauts-de-France
- Coordinates: 49°42′19″N 2°49′18″E
- Country: France
- Region: Hauts-de-France
- Department: Somme
- Arrondissement: Montdidier
- Canton: Roye
- Intercommunality: CC Grand Roye

Government
  - Mayor (2020–2026): Joël Keller
- Area^{1}: 5.5 km^{2} (2.1 sq mi)
- Elevation: 92 m (302 ft)
- Highest elevation: 97 m (318 ft)
- Lowest elevation: 83 m (272 ft)
- Population (2023): 250
  - Density: 45/km^{2} (120/sq mi)
- Time zone: UTC+01:00 (CET)
  - Summer (DST): UTC+02:00 (CEST)
- INSEE/Postal code: 80176 /80700
- ^{1} French Land Register data, which excludes lakes, ponds, glaciers > 1 km^{2} (0.386 sq mi or 247 acres) and river estuaries.

Carrépuis (French pronunciation: [kaʁepɥi]) is a commune in the Somme department in Hauts-de-France in northern France.

== Geography ==
The commune is situated on the D1930 road, just outside Roye and some 30 miles (48 km) southeast of Amiens.

== Population ==
Historical population
Year	Pop.	±% p.a.
1968	173	—
1975	215	+3.15%
1982	206	−0.61%
1990	198	−0.49%
1999	218	+1.07%
2007	283	+3.32%
2012	277	−0.43%
2017	272	−0.36%
2023	250	−1.40%
Source: INSEE

== See also ==
- Communes of the Somme department
