= Communauté de communes du Grand Roye =

Federation of municipalities in France

Grand Roye
- Communauté de communes
- Interactive map of Grand Roye
- Coordinates: 49°39′N 02°34′E
- Country: France
- Region: Hauts-de-France
- Department: Somme
- No. of communes: {{{nbcomm}}}
- Established: 2017
- Area: 396.7 km^{2} (153.2 sq mi)
- Population (2018): 25,626
  - Density: 64.60/km^{2} (167.3/sq mi)

The Communauté de communes du Grand Roye is a communauté de communes in the Somme département and in the Hauts-de-France région of France. It was created on 1 January 2012, and the former Communauté de communes du canton de Montdidier was merged into it on 1 January 2017. It consists of 62 communes, and its seat is in Montdidier. Its area is 396.7 km^{2}, and its population was 25,626 in 2018, of which 6,174 in Montdidier and 5,709 in Roye.

== Composition ==
The communauté de communes consists of the following 62 communes:

1. Andechy
2. Armancourt
3. Assainvillers
4. Ayencourt
5. Balâtre
6. Becquigny
7. Beuvraignes
8. Biarre
9. Bouillancourt-la-Bataille
10. Boussicourt
11. Bus-la-Mésière
12. Cantigny
13. Le Cardonnois
14. Carrépuis
15. Champien
16. Courtemanche
17. Crémery
18. Cressy-Omencourt
19. Damery
20. Dancourt-Popincourt
21. Davenescourt
22. L'Échelle-Saint-Aurin
23. Erches
24. Ercheu
25. Étalon
26. Ételfay
27. Faverolles
28. Fescamps
29. Fignières
30. Fonches-Fonchette
31. Fontaine-sous-Montdidier
32. Fresnoy-lès-Roye
33. Goyencourt
34. Gratibus
35. Grivillers
36. Gruny
37. Guerbigny
38. Hattencourt
39. Herly
40. Laboissière-en-Santerre
41. Laucourt
42. Liancourt-Fosse
43. Lignières
44. Malpart
45. Marché-Allouarde
46. Marestmontiers
47. Marquivillers
48. Mesnil-Saint-Georges
49. Montdidier
50. Piennes-Onvillers
51. Remaugies
52. Roiglise
53. Rollot
54. Roye
55. Rubescourt
56. Saint-Mard
57. Tilloloy
58. Trois-Rivières
59. Verpillières
60. Villers-lès-Roye
61. Villers-Tournelle
62. Warsy
