= Roiglise =

- Commune
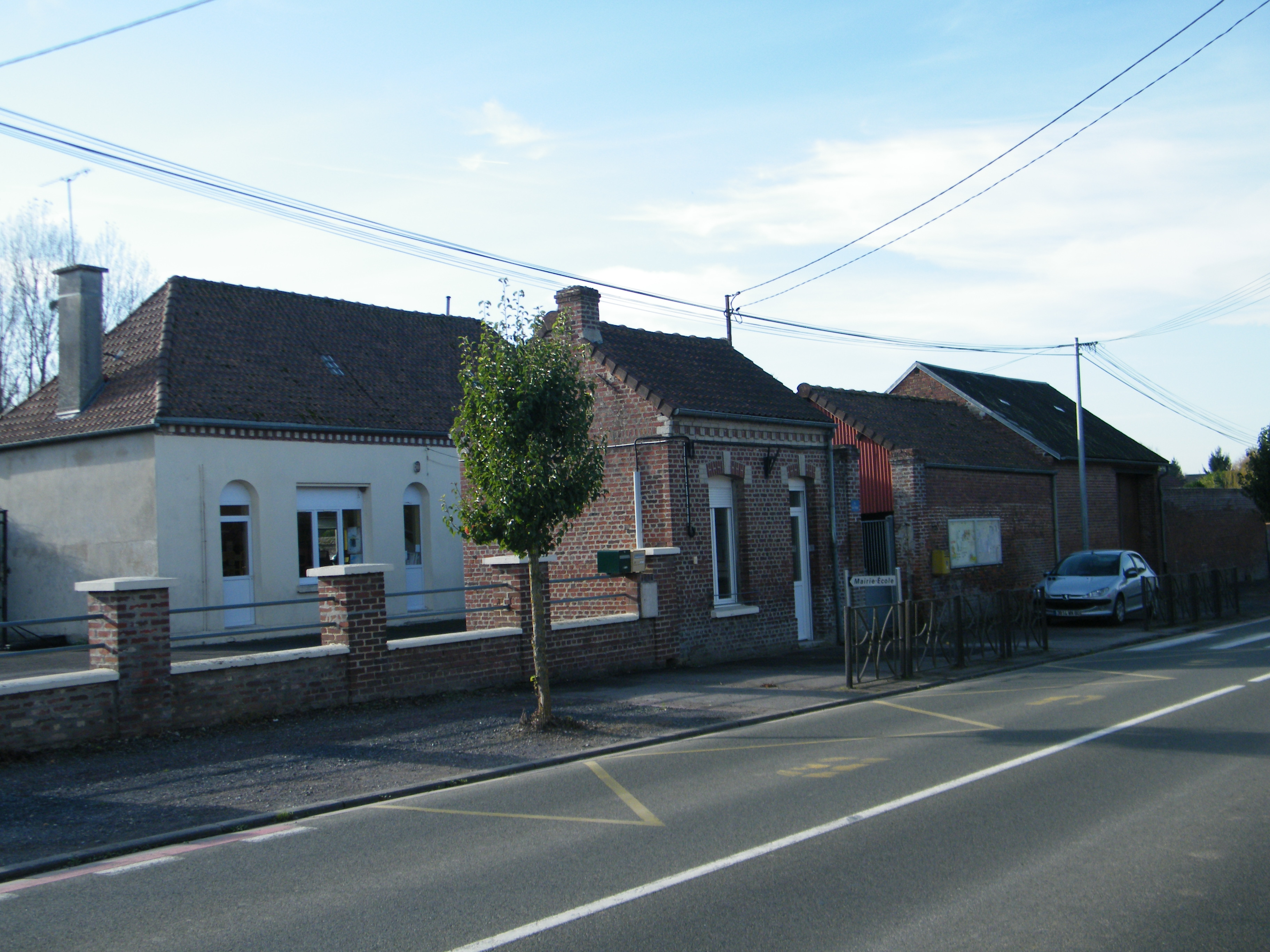
- The town hall and school in Roiglise
- Location of Roiglise
- Location within France Location within Hauts-de-France
- Coordinates: 49°41′01″N 2°49′52″E
- Country: France
- Region: Hauts-de-France
- Department: Somme
- Arrondissement: Montdidier
- Canton: Roye
- Intercommunality: CC Grand Roye

Government
  - Mayor (2020–2026): Bénédicte Thiébaut
- Area^{1}: 5.67 km^{2} (2.19 sq mi)
- Elevation: 79 m (259 ft)
- Highest elevation: 97 m (318 ft)
- Lowest elevation: 67 m (220 ft)
- Population (2023): 152
  - Density: 26.8/km^{2} (69.4/sq mi)
- Time zone: UTC+01:00 (CET)
  - Summer (DST): UTC+02:00 (CEST)
- INSEE/Postal code: 80676 /80700
- ^{1} French Land Register data, which excludes lakes, ponds, glaciers > 1 km^{2} (0.386 sq mi or 247 acres) and river estuaries.

Roiglise (French pronunciation: [ʁwaɡliz]) is a commune in the Somme department in Hauts-de-France in northern France.

== Geography ==
Roiglise is situated 25 miles (40 km) southeast of Amiens, on the D934 road and by the banks of the river Avre.

== Population ==
Historical population
Year	Pop.	±% p.a.
1968	140	—
1975	130	−1.05%
1982	140	+1.06%
1990	144	+0.35%
1999	162	+1.32%
2007	172	+0.75%
2012	165	−0.83%
2017	155	−1.24%
2023	152	−0.33%
Source: INSEE

== See also ==
- Communes of the Somme department
