= Cressy-Omencourt =

- Commune
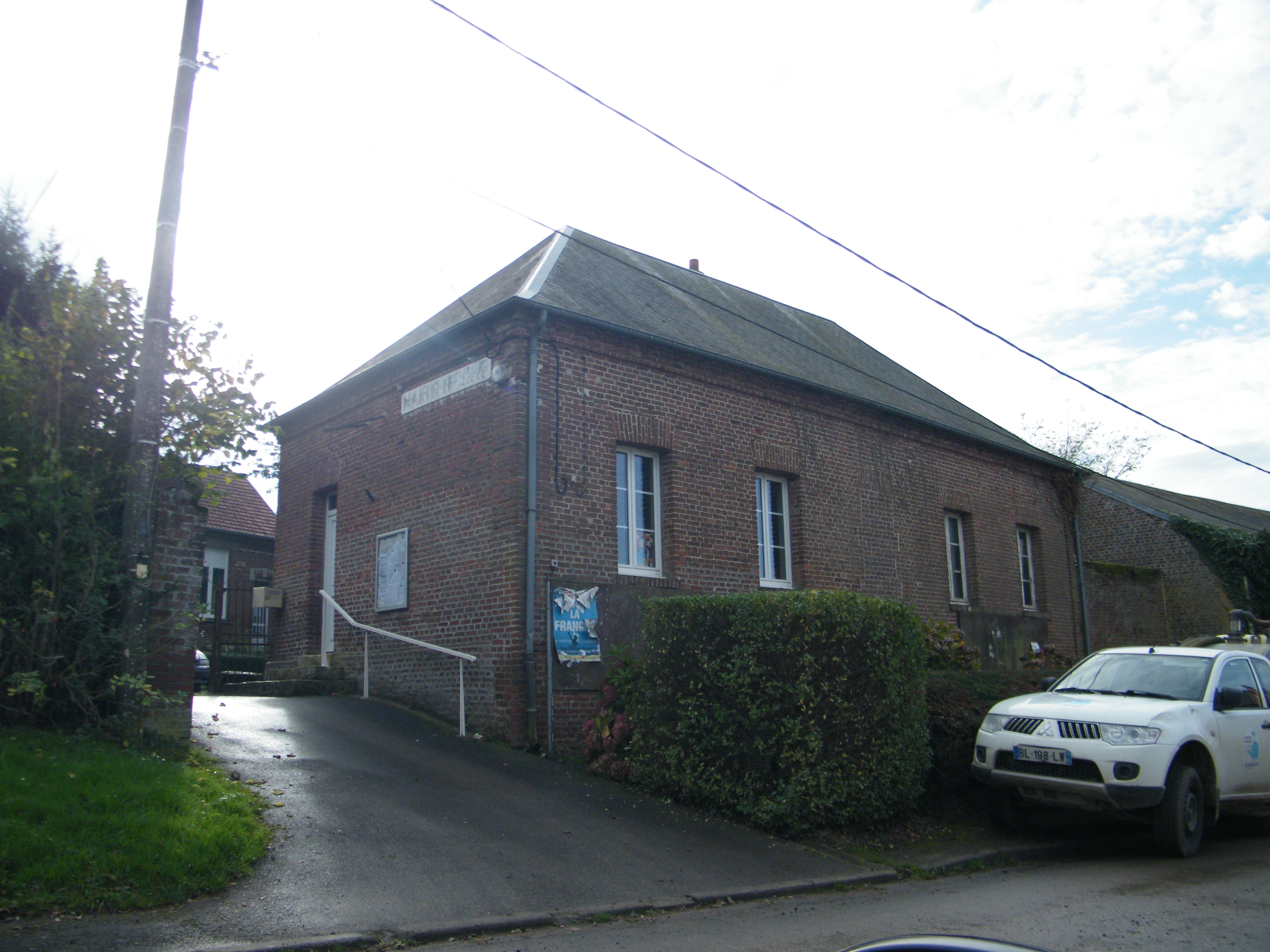
- The town hall and school in Cressy-Omencourt
- Location of Cressy-Omencourt
- Location within France Location within Hauts-de-France
- Coordinates: 49°43′40″N 2°55′00″E
- Country: France
- Region: Hauts-de-France
- Department: Somme
- Arrondissement: Montdidier
- Canton: Roye
- Intercommunality: CC Grand Roye

Government
  - Mayor (2020–2026): Olivier Depourcq
- Area^{1}: 7.67 km^{2} (2.96 sq mi)
- Elevation: 69 m (226 ft)
- Highest elevation: 91 m (299 ft)
- Lowest elevation: 67 m (220 ft)
- Population (2023): 127
  - Density: 16.6/km^{2} (42.9/sq mi)
- Time zone: UTC+01:00 (CET)
  - Summer (DST): UTC+02:00 (CEST)
- INSEE/Postal code: 80224 /80190
- ^{1} French Land Register data, which excludes lakes, ponds, glaciers > 1 km^{2} (0.386 sq mi or 247 acres) and river estuaries.

Cressy-Omencourt (French pronunciation: [kʁesi ɔmɑ̃kuʁ]; Picard: Quèrsin-Omincourt) is a commune in the Somme department in Hauts-de-France in northern France.

== Geography ==
Cressy-Omencourt is situated on the D227 and D15 crossroads, some 20 miles (32 km) southwest of Saint-Quentin.

== Population ==
Historical population
Year	Pop.	±% p.a.
1968	101	—
1975	89	−1.79%
1982	89	+0.00%
1990	116	+3.37%
1999	106	−1.00%
2007	101	−0.60%
2012	121	+3.68%
2017	123	+0.33%
2023	127	+0.53%
Source: INSEE

== See also ==
- Communes of the Somme department
