= Armancourt, Somme =

Armancourt
- Commune
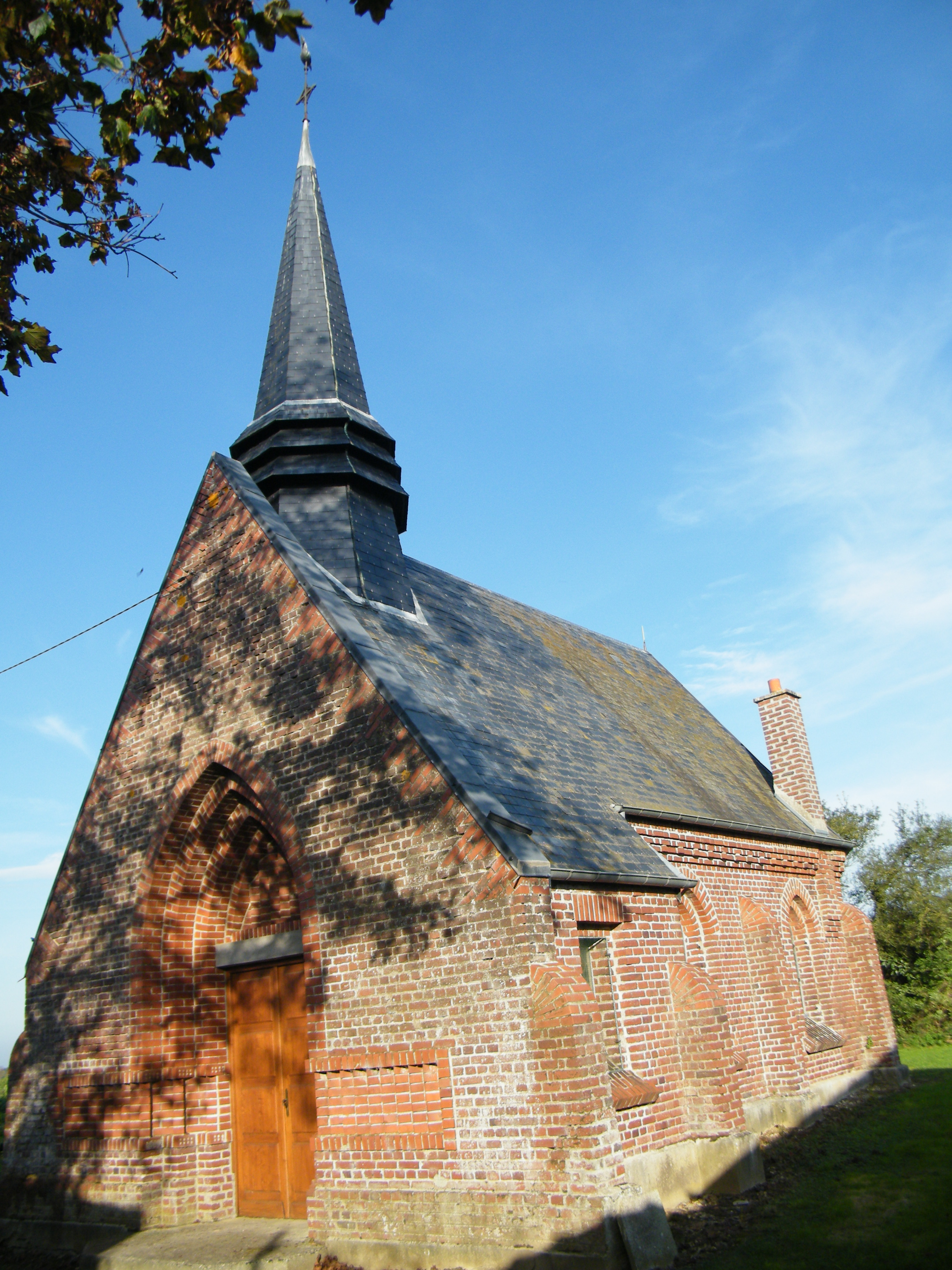
- The church in Armancourt

- Coat of arms
- Location of Armancourt
- Location within France Location within Hauts-de-France
- Coordinates: 49°40′44″N 2°42′47″E
- Country: France
- Region: Hauts-de-France
- Department: Somme
- Arrondissement: Montdidier
- Canton: Roye
- Intercommunality: CC Grand Roye

Government
  - Mayor (2020–2026): Marjorie Delaporte
- Area^{1}: 2.16 km^{2} (0.83 sq mi)
- Elevation: 100 m (330 ft)
- Highest elevation: 101 m (331 ft)
- Lowest elevation: 72 m (236 ft)
- Population (2023): 33
  - Density: 15/km^{2} (40/sq mi)
- Time zone: UTC+01:00 (CET)
  - Summer (DST): UTC+02:00 (CEST)
- INSEE/Postal code: 80027 /80700
- ^{1} French Land Register data, which excludes lakes, ponds, glaciers > 1 km^{2} (0.386 sq mi or 247 acres) and river estuaries.

Armancourt (French pronunciation: [aʁmɑ̃kuʁ]) is a commune in the Somme department in Hauts-de-France in northern France.

== Geography ==
The commune is situated on the D133 road, about 30 miles (48 km) southeast of Amiens.

== Population ==
Historical population
Year	Pop.	±% p.a.
1968	38	—
1975	29	−3.79%
1982	22	−3.87%
1990	19	−1.82%
1999	21	+1.12%
2007	19	−1.24%
2012	19	+0.00%
2017	33	+11.67%
2023	33	+0.00%
Source: INSEE

== See also ==
Communes of the Somme department
