= Dancourt-Popincourt =

- Commune
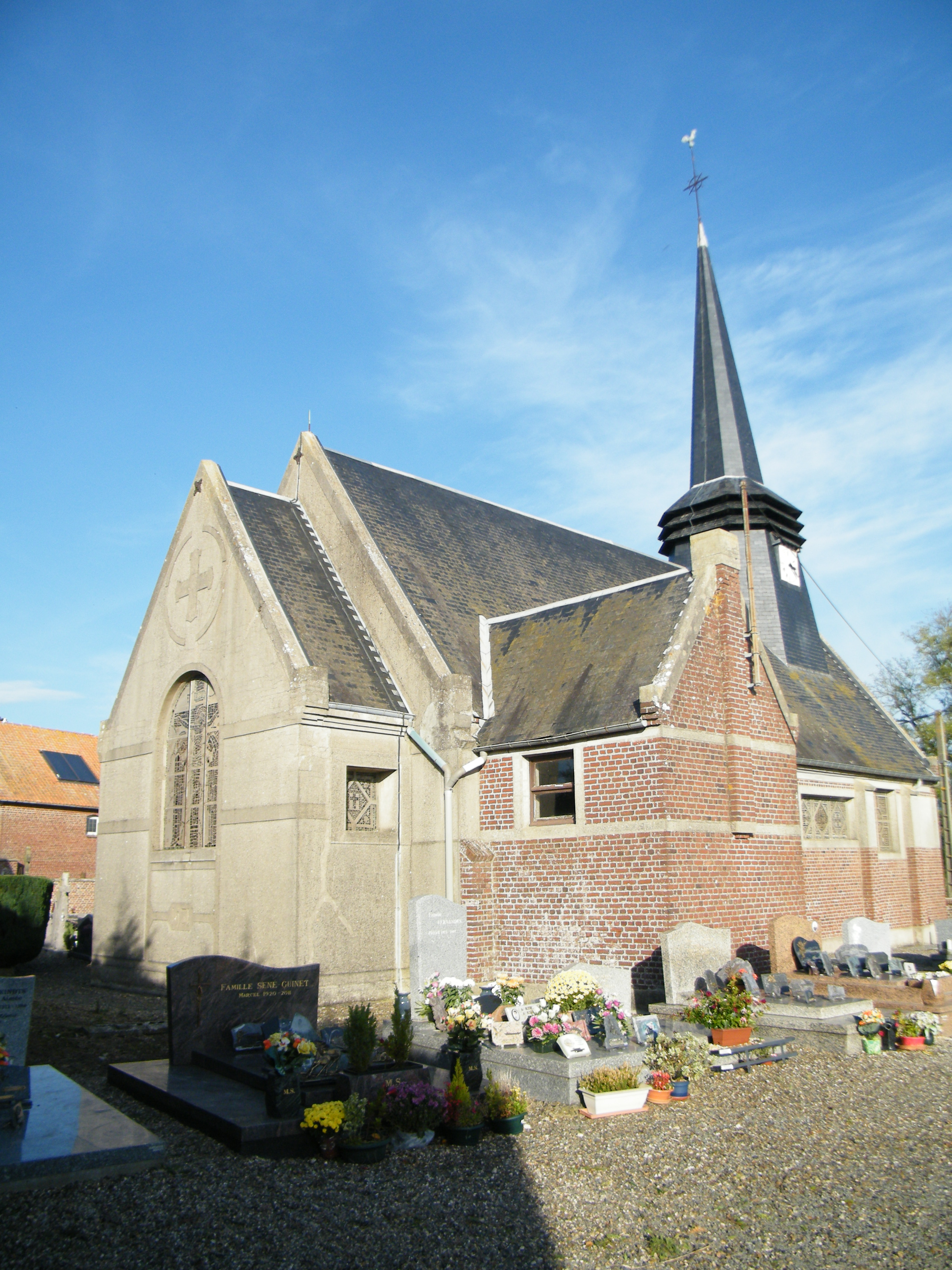
- The church in Dancourt-Popincourt
- Location of Dancourt-Popincourt
- Location within France Location within Hauts-de-France
- Coordinates: 49°40′10″N 2°43′59″E
- Country: France
- Region: Hauts-de-France
- Department: Somme
- Arrondissement: Montdidier
- Canton: Roye
- Intercommunality: CC Grand Roye

Government
  - Mayor (2020–2026): Martine Vansteenkiste
- Area^{1}: 5.9 km^{2} (2.3 sq mi)
- Elevation: 90 m (300 ft)
- Highest elevation: 101 m (331 ft)
- Lowest elevation: 82 m (269 ft)
- Population (2023): 150
  - Density: 25/km^{2} (66/sq mi)
- Time zone: UTC+01:00 (CET)
  - Summer (DST): UTC+02:00 (CEST)
- INSEE/Postal code: 80233 /80700
- ^{1} French Land Register data, which excludes lakes, ponds, glaciers > 1 km^{2} (0.386 sq mi or 247 acres) and river estuaries.

Dancourt-Popincourt (French pronunciation: [dɑ̃kuʁ pɔpɛ̃kuʁ]) is a commune in the Somme department in Hauts-de-France in northern France.

== Geography ==
The commune is situated on the D930 and D133 crossroads, some 4 miles (6 km) southwest of Roye.

== Population ==
Historical population
Year	Pop.	±% p.a.
1968	173	—
1975	151	−1.92%
1982	127	−2.44%
1990	136	+0.86%
1999	128	−0.67%
2007	146	+1.66%
2012	142	−0.55%
2017	155	+1.77%
2023	150	−0.55%
Source: INSEE

== See also ==
- Communes of the Somme department
