= Fonches-Fonchette =

- Commune
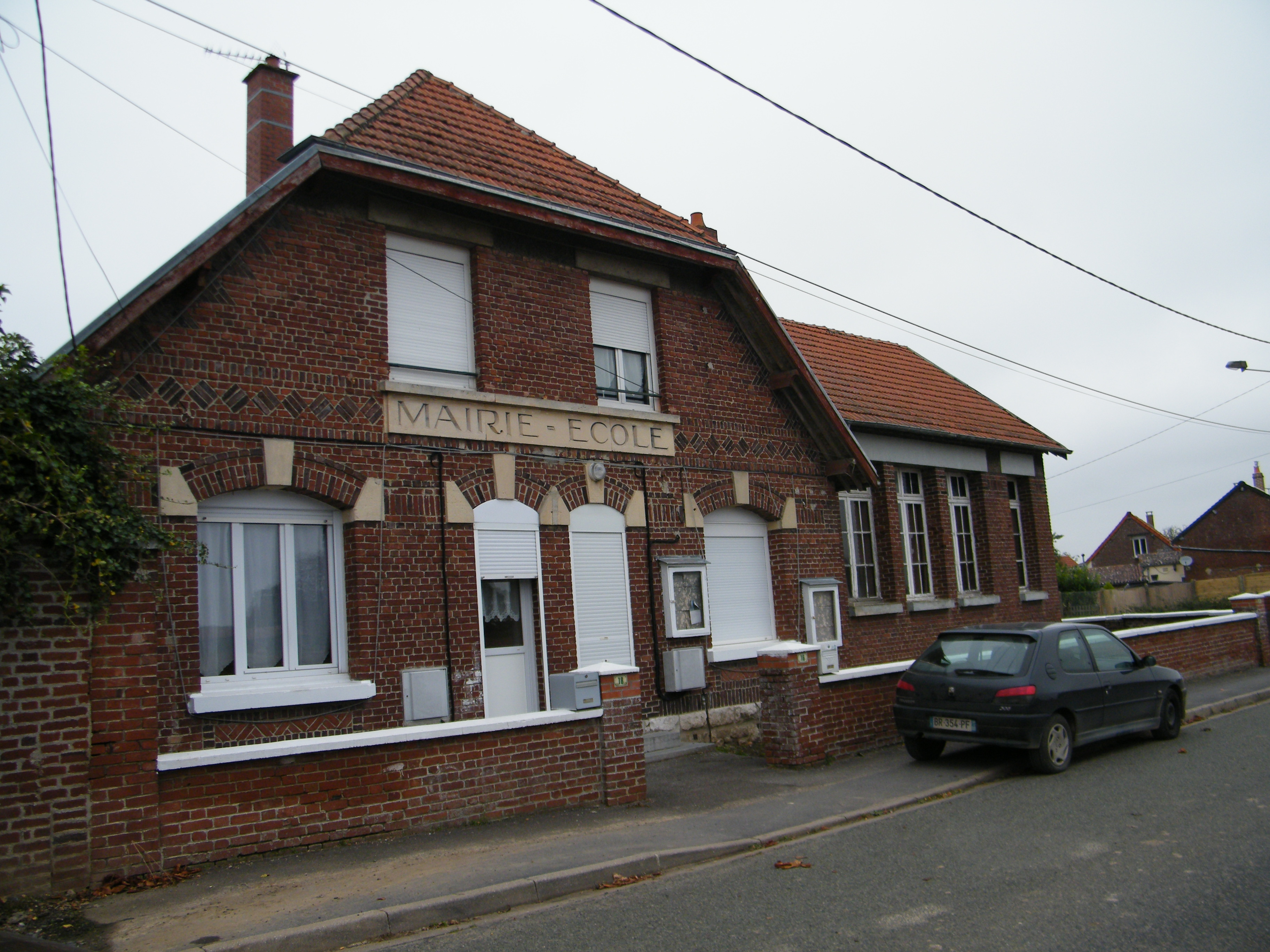
- The town hall and school in Fonches-Fonchette
- Location of Fonches-Fonchette
- Location within France Location within Hauts-de-France
- Coordinates: 49°46′35″N 2°49′06″E
- Country: France
- Region: Hauts-de-France
- Department: Somme
- Arrondissement: Montdidier
- Canton: Roye
- Intercommunality: CC Grand Roye

Government
  - Mayor (2020–2026): Gauthier Guyot
- Area^{1}: 5.02 km^{2} (1.94 sq mi)
- Elevation: 84 m (276 ft)
- Highest elevation: 89 m (292 ft)
- Lowest elevation: 64 m (210 ft)
- Population (2023): 168
  - Density: 33.5/km^{2} (86.7/sq mi)
- Time zone: UTC+01:00 (CET)
  - Summer (DST): UTC+02:00 (CEST)
- INSEE/Postal code: 80322 /80700
- ^{1} French Land Register data, which excludes lakes, ponds, glaciers > 1 km^{2} (0.386 sq mi or 247 acres) and river estuaries.

Fonches-Fonchette (French pronunciation: [fɔ̃ʃ fɔ̃ʃɛt]) is a commune in the Somme department in Hauts-de-France in northern France.

== Geography ==
The commune is situated on the D161 road junction with the N17, some 26 miles (42 km) southeast of Amiens.

== Population ==
Historical population
Year	Pop.	±% p.a.
1968	154	—
1975	156	+0.18%
1982	111	−4.75%
1990	121	+1.08%
1999	134	+1.14%
2007	144	+0.90%
2012	158	+1.87%
2017	164	+0.75%
2023	168	+0.40%
Source: INSEE

== See also ==
- Communes of the Somme department
