= Verpillières =

- Commune
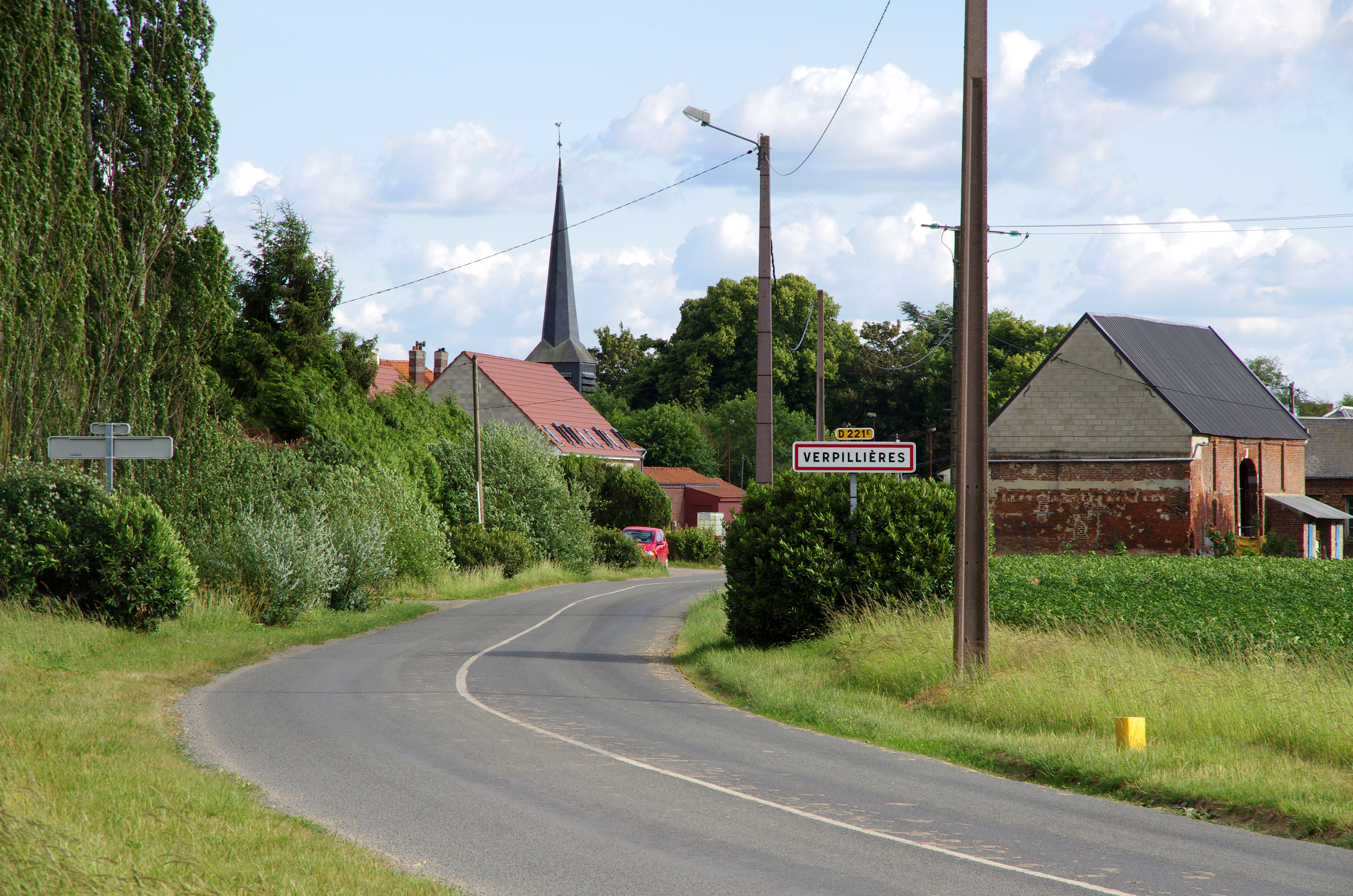
- The road into Verpillières
- Location of Verpillières
- Location within France Location within Hauts-de-France
- Coordinates: 49°40′05″N 2°49′28″E
- Country: France
- Region: Hauts-de-France
- Department: Somme
- Arrondissement: Montdidier
- Canton: Roye
- Intercommunality: CC Grand Roye

Government
  - Mayor (2020–2026): Jocelyne Levert
- Area^{1}: 4.87 km^{2} (1.88 sq mi)
- Elevation: 83 m (272 ft)
- Highest elevation: 85 m (279 ft)
- Lowest elevation: 74 m (243 ft)
- Population (2023): 168
  - Density: 34.5/km^{2} (89.3/sq mi)
- Time zone: UTC+01:00 (CET)
  - Summer (DST): UTC+02:00 (CEST)
- INSEE/Postal code: 80790 /80700
- ^{1} French Land Register data, which excludes lakes, ponds, glaciers > 1 km^{2} (0.386 sq mi or 247 acres) and river estuaries.

Verpillières is a commune in the Somme department in Hauts-de-France in northern France.

== Geography ==
The commune is situated 51 kilometres (32 mi) southeast of Amiens, on the D221e road, on the border with the department of Oise.

== Population ==
Historical population
Year	Pop.	±% p.a.
1968	159	—
1975	122	−3.71%
1982	142	+2.19%
1990	161	+1.58%
1999	169	+0.54%
2007	169	+0.00%
2012	159	−1.21%
2017	165	+0.74%
2023	168	+0.30%
Source: INSEE

== Places of interest ==
- The seventeenth century church of Saint Martin's. Ruined during the First World War, restoration work began in 1926 and a new bell was christened in 1932.

== See also ==
- Communes of the Somme department
