= Laucourt =

- Commune
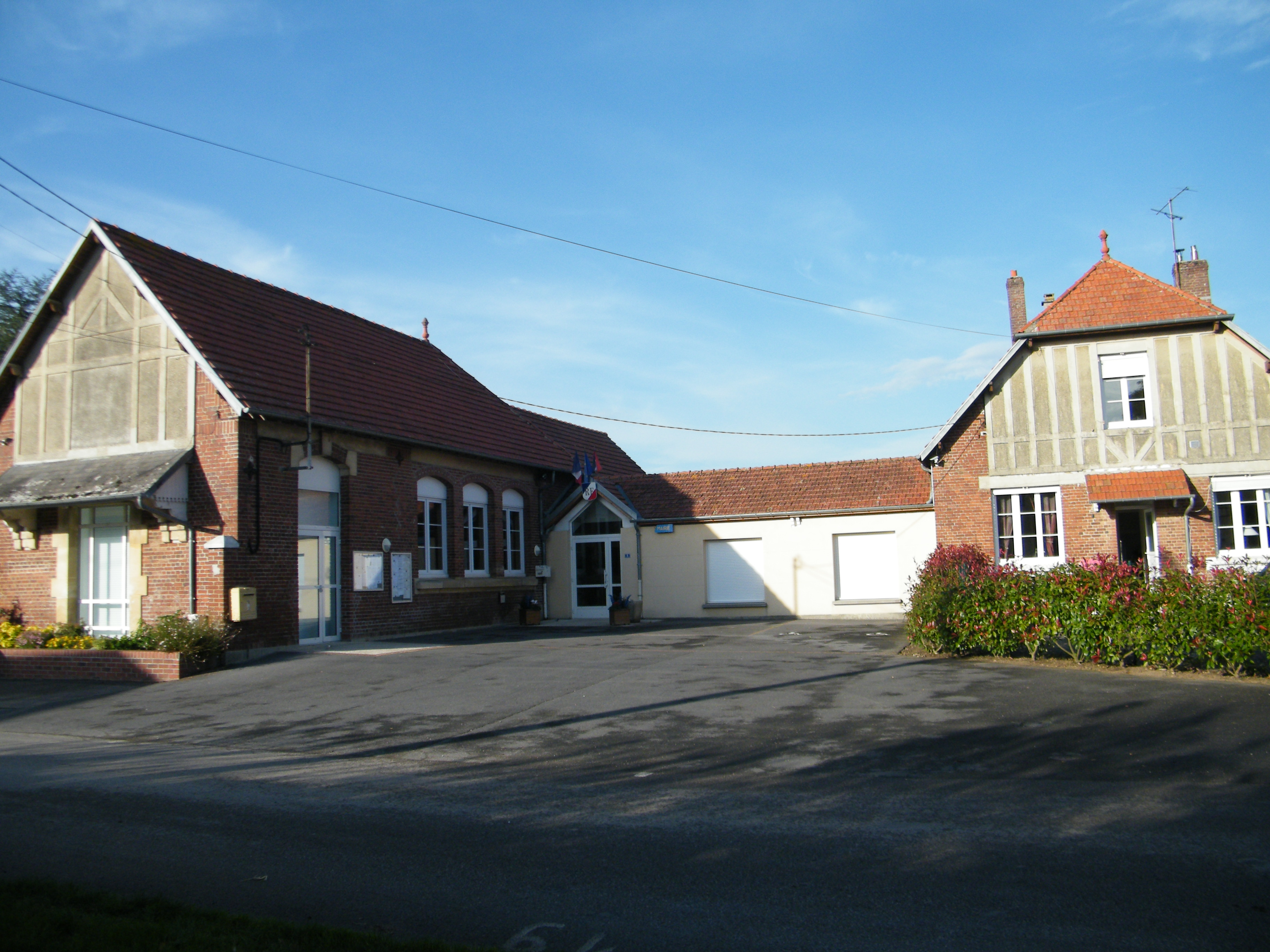
- The town hall and school in Laucourt
- Location of Laucourt
- Location within France Location within Hauts-de-France
- Coordinates: 49°40′29″N 2°45′31″E
- Country: France
- Region: Hauts-de-France
- Department: Somme
- Arrondissement: Montdidier
- Canton: Roye
- Intercommunality: CC Grand Roye

Government
  - Mayor (2020–2026): Didier Lienard
- Area^{1}: 6.37 km^{2} (2.46 sq mi)
- Elevation: 81 m (266 ft)
- Highest elevation: 97 m (318 ft)
- Lowest elevation: 74 m (243 ft)
- Population (2023): 183
  - Density: 28.7/km^{2} (74.4/sq mi)
- Time zone: UTC+01:00 (CET)
  - Summer (DST): UTC+02:00 (CEST)
- INSEE/Postal code: 80467 /80700
- ^{1} French Land Register data, which excludes lakes, ponds, glaciers > 1 km^{2} (0.386 sq mi or 247 acres) and river estuaries.

Laucourt (French pronunciation: [lokuʁ]) is a commune in the Somme department in Hauts-de-France in northern France.

== Geography ==
Laucourt is situated on the D255 road, just off the N17 and less than a mile from the A1 autoroute, some 30 miles (48 km) southeast of Amiens in the south-eastern part of the département.

== Population ==
Historical population
Year	Pop.	±% p.a.
1968	185	—
1975	146	−3.33%
1982	164	+1.67%
1990	190	+1.86%
1999	193	+0.17%
2007	189	−0.26%
2012	171	−1.98%
2017	203	+3.49%
2023	183	−1.71%
Source: INSEE

== See also ==
- Communes of the Somme department
