= Goyencourt =

- Commune
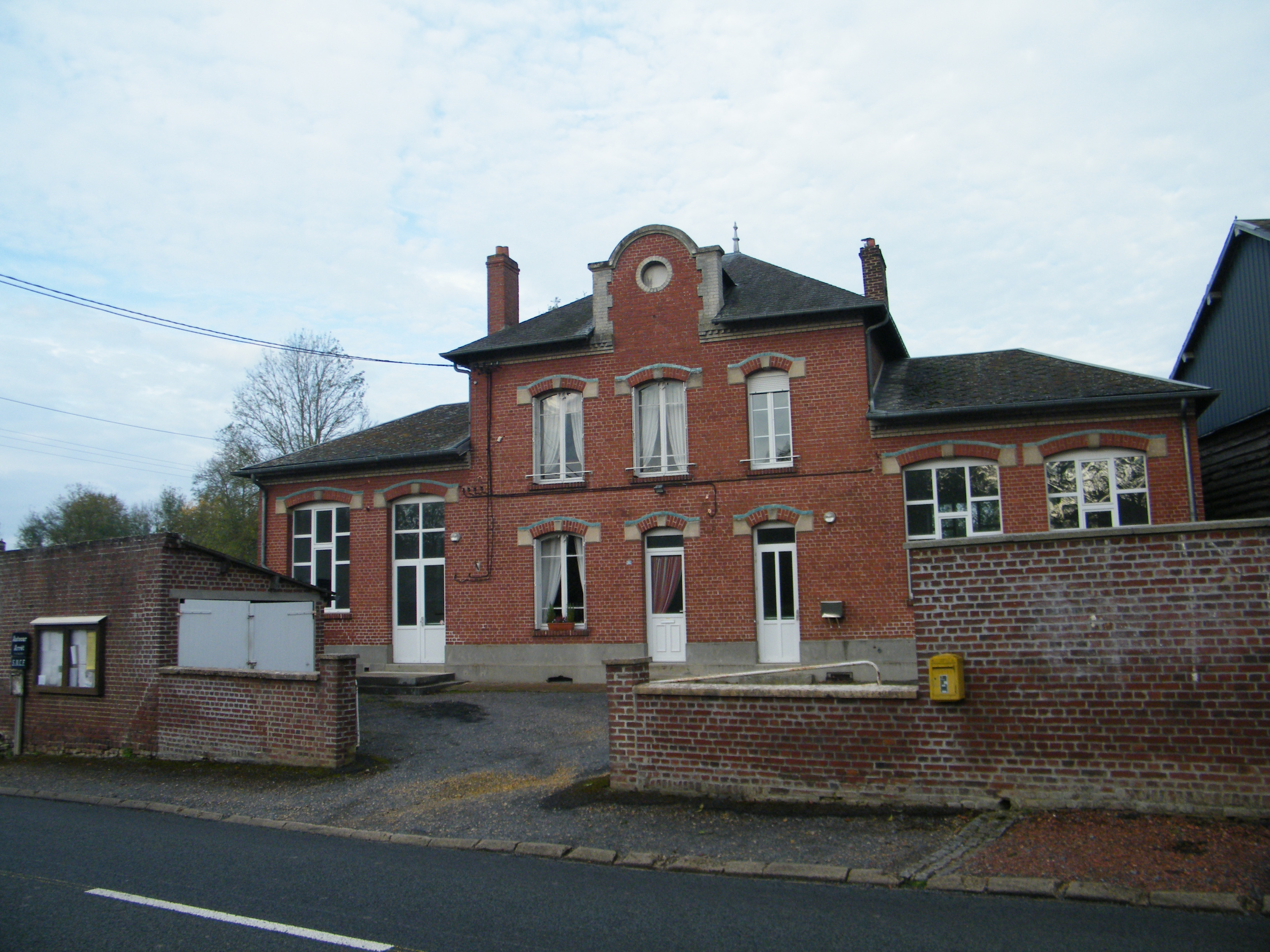
- The town hall in Goyencourt
- Location of Goyencourt
- Location within France Location within Hauts-de-France
- Coordinates: 49°43′35″N 2°45′59″E
- Country: France
- Region: Hauts-de-France
- Department: Somme
- Arrondissement: Montdidier
- Canton: Roye
- Intercommunality: CC Grand Roye

Government
  - Mayor (2020–2026): Valérie Bauduin
- Area^{1}: 5.38 km^{2} (2.08 sq mi)
- Elevation: 90 m (300 ft)
- Highest elevation: 99 m (325 ft)
- Lowest elevation: 77 m (253 ft)
- Population (2023): 99
  - Density: 18/km^{2} (48/sq mi)
- Time zone: UTC+01:00 (CET)
  - Summer (DST): UTC+02:00 (CEST)
- INSEE/Postal code: 80383 /80700
- ^{1} French Land Register data, which excludes lakes, ponds, glaciers > 1 km^{2} (0.386 sq mi or 247 acres) and river estuaries.

Goyencourt is a commune in the Somme department in Hauts-de-France in northern France.

== Geography ==
Goyencourt is situated at the D34 and D132 crossroads, some 27 miles (43 km) southeast of Amiens. Cereal growing is the primary agricultural activity.

== History ==
- The vestiges of a Gallo-Roman villa can be found within the boundaries of the commune.
- In the 8th and 9th century, the village was under the control of the abbey of Ourscamp.
- Middle Age: Lords of Gossencourt ("Goyencourt").
- In 1653, during the upheaval of the Fronde, the village was ransacked by the Spanish army, led by Louis II de Bourbon, Prince de Condé, who laid siege to Roye.
- By 1918, at the end of the First World War, the village and the chateau lay in ruins.

== Population ==
Historical population
Year	Pop.	±% p.a.
1968	115	—
1975	106	−1.16%
1982	96	−1.41%
1990	98	+0.26%
1999	89	−1.06%
2007	95	+0.82%
2012	95	+0.00%
2017	94	−0.21%
2023	99	+0.87%
Source: INSEE

== Places of interest ==
- The modern church of Saint-Martin
- The chapel of Notre-Dame-de-Liesse

== See also ==
- Communes of the Somme department
