= Bus-la-Mésière =

- Commune
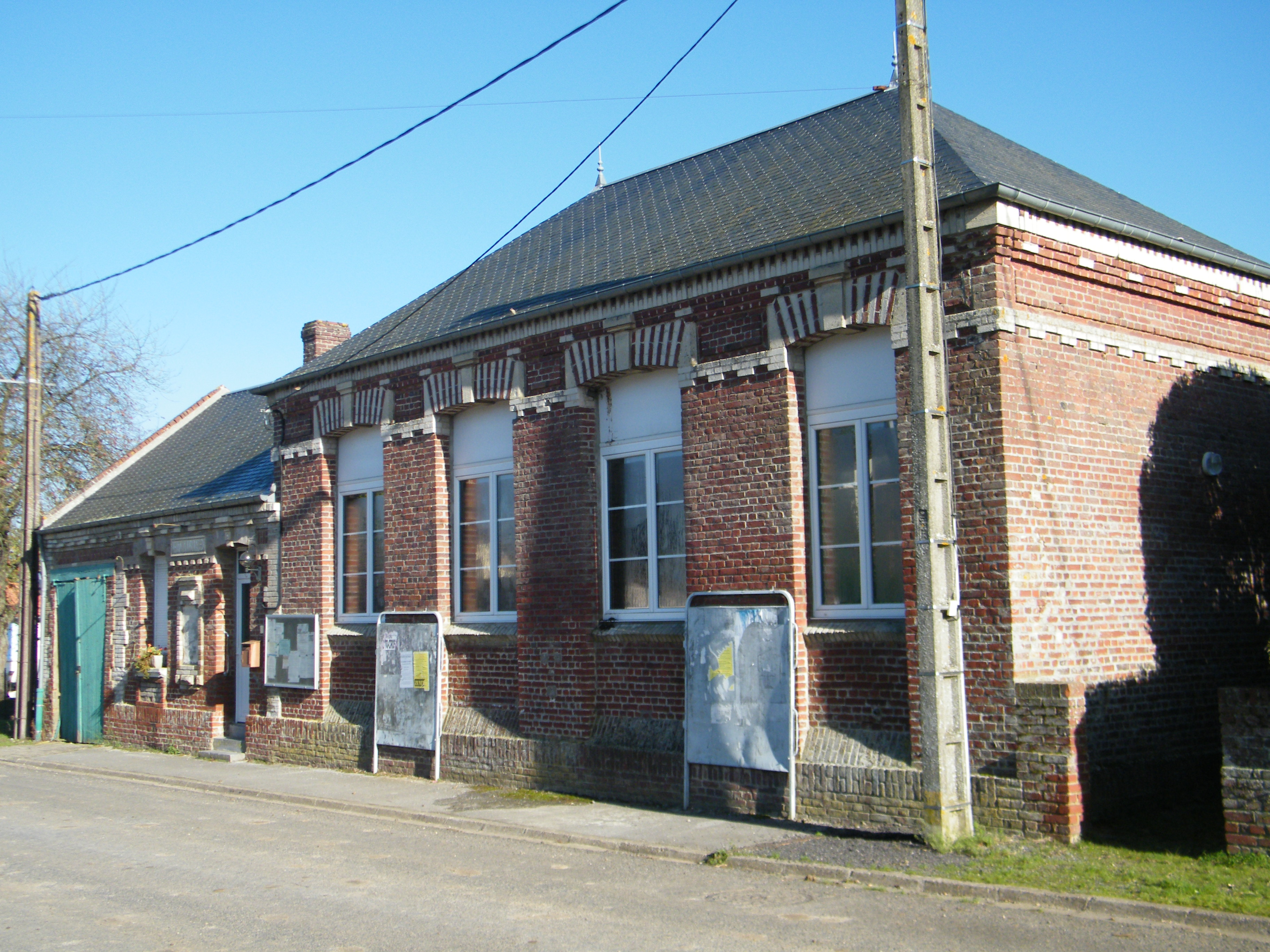
- The town hall in Bus-la-Mésière

- Coat of arms
- Location of Bus-la-Mésière
- Location within France Location within Hauts-de-France
- Coordinates: 49°38′15″N 2°42′58″E
- Country: France
- Region: Hauts-de-France
- Department: Somme
- Arrondissement: Montdidier
- Canton: Roye
- Intercommunality: CC Grand Roye

Government
  - Mayor (2020–2026): Guillaume Barbier
- Area^{1}: 6.85 km^{2} (2.64 sq mi)
- Elevation: 94 m (308 ft)
- Highest elevation: 114 m (374 ft)
- Lowest elevation: 91 m (299 ft)
- Population (2023): 144
  - Density: 21.0/km^{2} (54.4/sq mi)
- Time zone: UTC+01:00 (CET)
  - Summer (DST): UTC+02:00 (CEST)
- INSEE/Postal code: 80152 /80700
- ^{1} French Land Register data, which excludes lakes, ponds, glaciers > 1 km^{2} (0.386 sq mi or 247 acres) and river estuaries.

Bus-la-Mésière (Picard: Bu-l’Mésière) is a commune in the Somme department in Hauts-de-France in northern France.

== Geography ==
The commune is situated on the D68 road, some 30 miles (48 km) southeast of Amiens.

== Population ==
Historical population
Year	Pop.	±% p.a.
1968	109	—
1975	94	−2.09%
1982	104	+1.45%
1990	102	−0.24%
1999	120	+1.82%
2007	137	+1.67%
2012	155	+2.50%
2017	167	+1.50%
2023	144	−2.44%
Source: INSEE

== See also ==
- Communes of the Somme department
