= Fignières =

- Commune
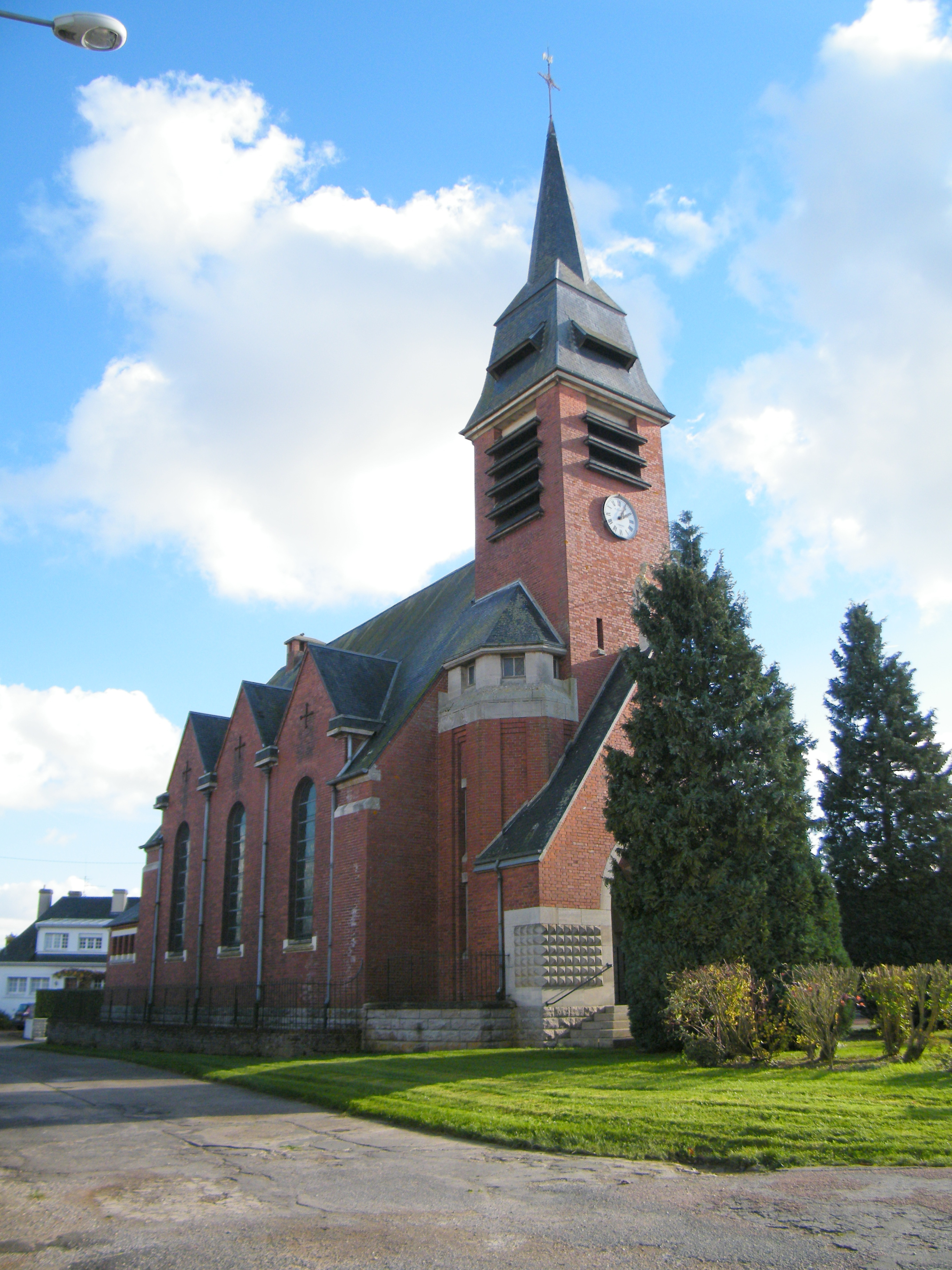
- The church in Fignières
- Location of Fignières
- Location within France Location within Hauts-de-France
- Coordinates: 49°41′05″N 2°35′17″E
- Country: France
- Region: Hauts-de-France
- Department: Somme
- Arrondissement: Montdidier
- Canton: Roye
- Intercommunality: CC Grand Roye

Government
  - Mayor (2020–2026): Martine Tellier
- Area^{1}: 6.6 km^{2} (2.5 sq mi)
- Elevation: 105 m (344 ft)
- Highest elevation: 112 m (367 ft)
- Lowest elevation: 69 m (226 ft)
- Population (2023): 142
  - Density: 22/km^{2} (56/sq mi)
- Time zone: UTC+01:00 (CET)
  - Summer (DST): UTC+02:00 (CEST)
- INSEE/Postal code: 80311 /80500
- ^{1} French Land Register data, which excludes lakes, ponds, glaciers > 1 km^{2} (0.386 sq mi or 247 acres) and river estuaries.

Fignières (French pronunciation: [fiɲɛʁ]; Picard: Fignière) is a commune in the Somme department in Hauts-de-France in northern France.

== Geography ==
The commune is situated on the D135 and D41 road junction, some 22 miles (35 km) southeast of Amiens.

== Population ==
Historical population
Year	Pop.	±% p.a.
1968	114	—
1975	130	+1.89%
1982	153	+2.35%
1990	126	−2.40%
1999	124	−0.18%
2007	142	+1.71%
2012	151	+1.24%
2017	154	+0.39%
2023	142	−1.34%
Source: INSEE

== See also ==
- Communes of the Somme department
