= Malpart =

- Commune
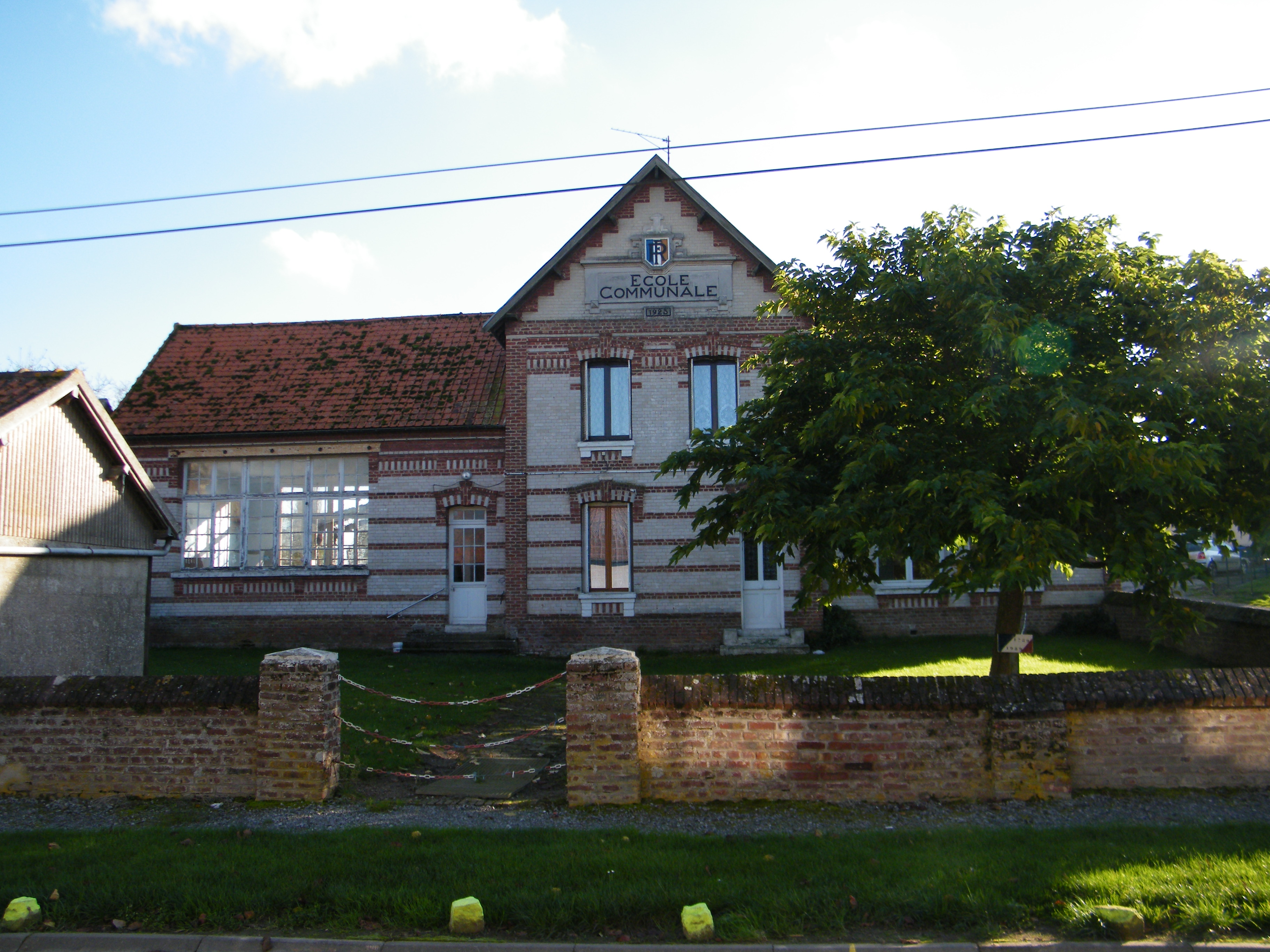
- The school in Malpart
- Location of Malpart
- Location within France Location within Hauts-de-France
- Coordinates: 49°41′36″N 2°29′58″E
- Country: France
- Region: Hauts-de-France
- Department: Somme
- Arrondissement: Montdidier
- Canton: Roye
- Intercommunality: CC Grand Roye

Government
  - Mayor (2020–2026): Sabrina Barthe-Gricourt
- Area^{1}: 4.25 km^{2} (1.64 sq mi)
- Elevation: 100 m (330 ft)
- Highest elevation: 112 m (367 ft)
- Lowest elevation: 80 m (260 ft)
- Population (2023): 70
  - Density: 16/km^{2} (43/sq mi)
- Time zone: UTC+01:00 (CET)
  - Summer (DST): UTC+02:00 (CEST)
- INSEE/Postal code: 80504 /80250
- ^{1} French Land Register data, which excludes lakes, ponds, glaciers > 1 km^{2} (0.386 sq mi or 247 acres) and river estuaries.

Malpart (French pronunciation: [malpaʁ]) is a commune in the Somme department in Hauts-de-France in northern France. Malpart is situated on the D26a road, some 20 miles (32 km) southeast of Amiens.

== Population ==
Historical population
Year	Pop.	±% p.a.
1968	97	—
1975	68	−4.95%
1982	60	−1.77%
1990	61	+0.21%
1999	59	−0.37%
2007	68	+1.79%
2012	75	+1.98%
2017	78	+0.79%
2023	70	−1.79%
Source: INSEE

== See also ==
- Communes of the Somme department
