= Warsy =

- Commune
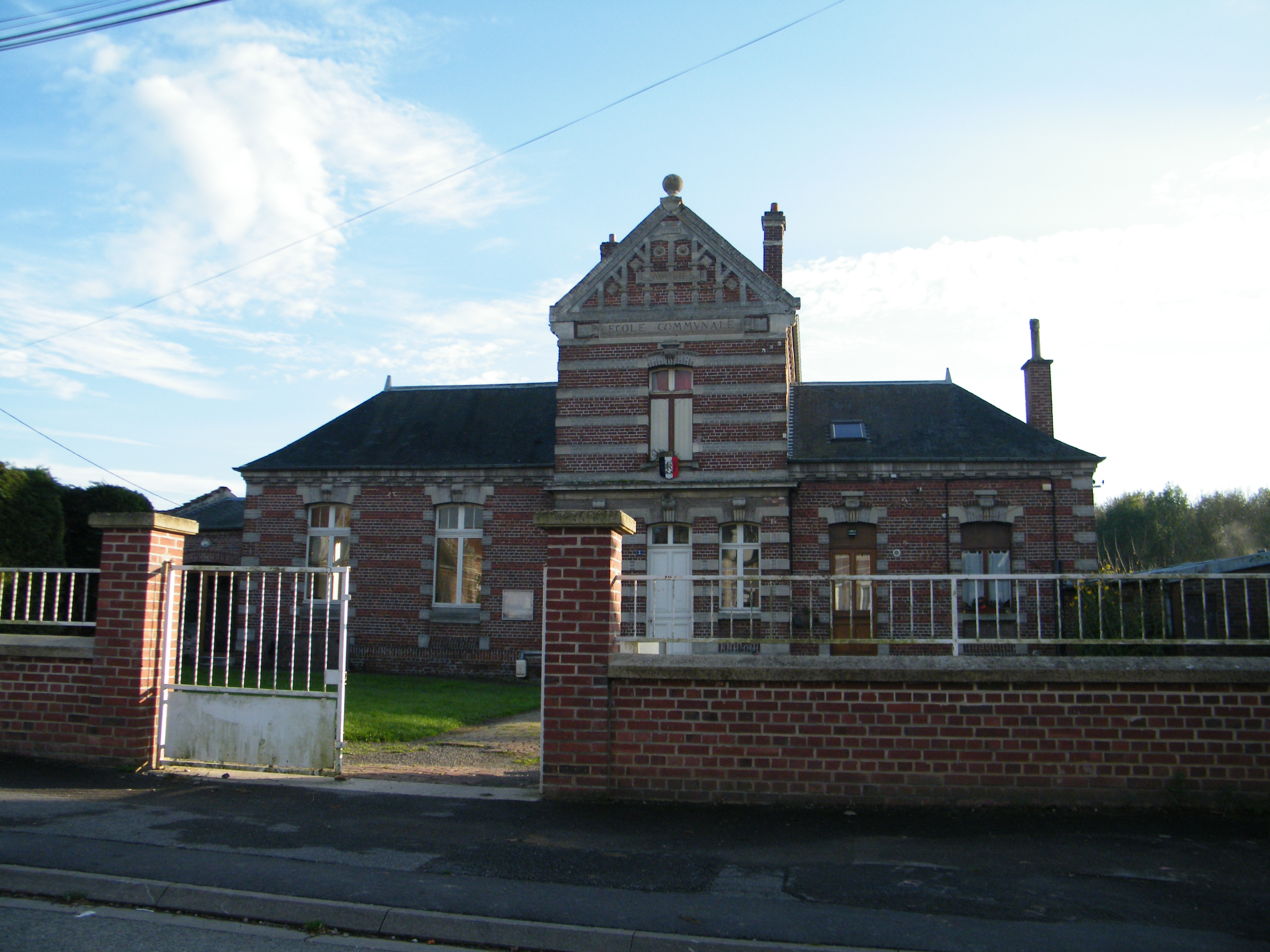
- The town hall and school in Warsy
- Location of Warsy
- Location within France Location within Hauts-de-France
- Coordinates: 49°42′00″N 2°38′58″E
- Country: France
- Region: Hauts-de-France
- Department: Somme
- Arrondissement: Montdidier
- Canton: Roye
- Intercommunality: Grand Roye

Government
  - Mayor (2020–2026): Christophe Dumont
- Area^{1}: 2.98 km^{2} (1.15 sq mi)
- Elevation: 100 m (330 ft)
- Highest elevation: 105 m (344 ft)
- Lowest elevation: 52 m (171 ft)
- Population (2023): 139
  - Density: 46.6/km^{2} (121/sq mi)
- Time zone: UTC+01:00 (CET)
  - Summer (DST): UTC+02:00 (CEST)
- INSEE/Postal code: 80822 /80500
- ^{1} French Land Register data, which excludes lakes, ponds, glaciers > 1 km^{2} (0.386 sq mi or 247 acres) and river estuaries.

Warsy is a commune in the Somme department in Hauts-de-France in northern France.

== Geography ==
Warsy is situated 22 miles(35 km) southeast of Amiens, just off the D329 road

== Population ==
Historical population
Year	Pop.	±% p.a.
1968	90	—
1975	98	+1.22%
1982	69	−4.89%
1990	91	+3.52%
1999	108	+1.92%
2007	118	+1.11%
2012	127	+1.48%
2017	143	+2.40%
2023	139	−0.47%
Source: INSEE

== Places of interest ==
- The château of Warsy. http://www.warsy.com/
- The nineteenth century church.
- The old public wash-house (no longer functioning).
- The Second World War memorial.
- An old school, not used since the 1960s.
- The mairie.

== See also ==
- Communes of the Somme department
