= Le Cardonnois =

- Commune
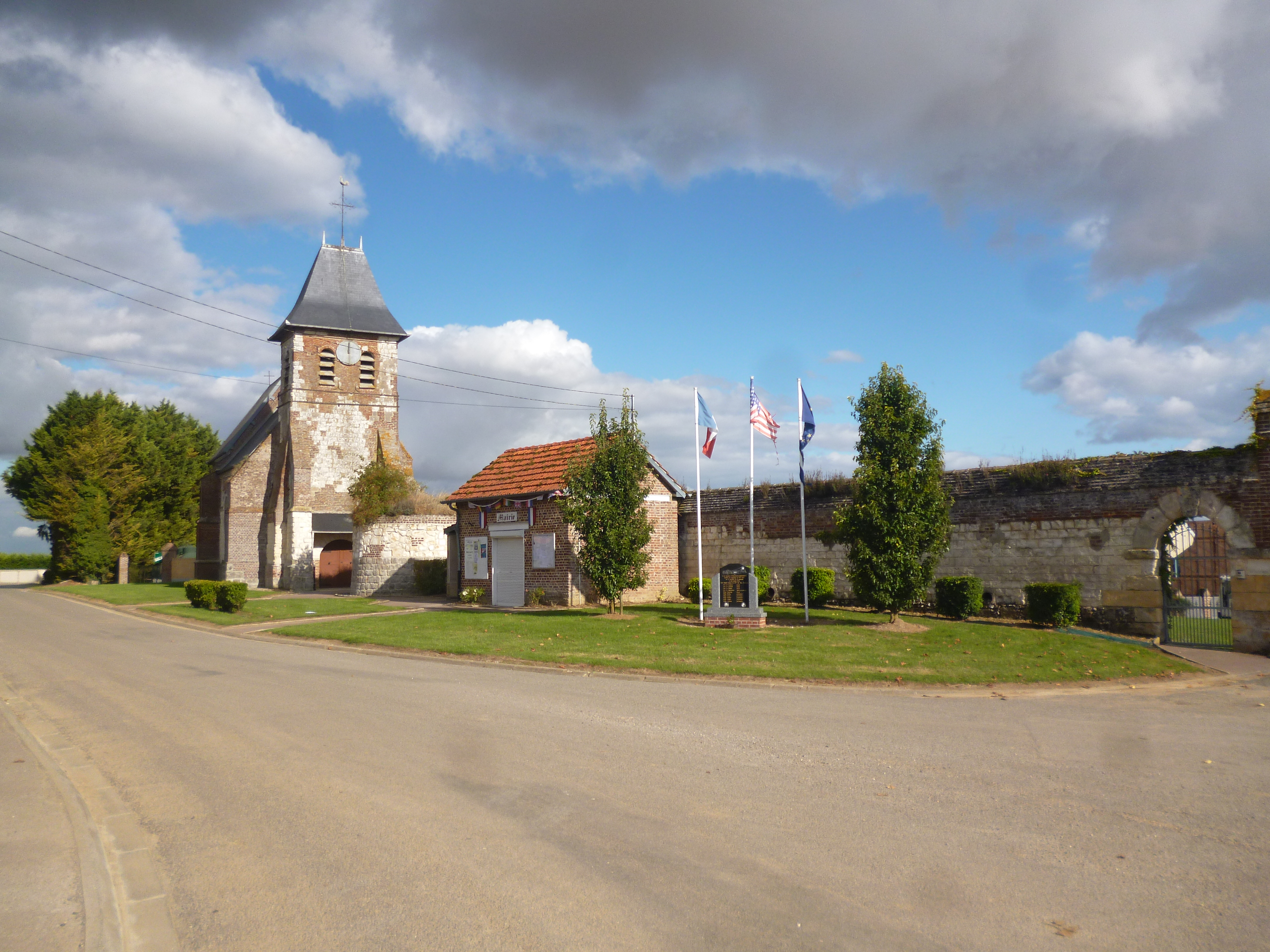
- The church and town hall in Le Cardonnois
- Location of Le Cardonnois
- Location within France Location within Hauts-de-France
- Coordinates: 49°37′42″N 2°28′51″E
- Country: France
- Region: Hauts-de-France
- Department: Somme
- Arrondissement: Montdidier
- Canton: Roye
- Intercommunality: CC Grand Roye

Government
  - Mayor (2020–2026): Jean-Luc Guyon
- Area^{1}: 2.37 km^{2} (0.92 sq mi)
- Elevation: 116 m (381 ft)
- Highest elevation: 135 m (443 ft)
- Lowest elevation: 72 m (236 ft)
- Population (2023): 75
  - Density: 32/km^{2} (82/sq mi)
- Time zone: UTC+01:00 (CET)
  - Summer (DST): UTC+02:00 (CEST)
- INSEE/Postal code: 80174 /80500
- ^{1} French Land Register data, which excludes lakes, ponds, glaciers > 1 km^{2} (0.386 sq mi or 247 acres) and river estuaries.

Le Cardonnois (French pronunciation: [lə kaʁdɔnwa]; Picard: L’Cardonois) is a commune in the Somme department in Hauts-de-France in northern France.

== Geography ==
The commune is situated on the D188 road, some 30 miles (48 km) south-southeast of Amiens.

== Population ==
Historical population
Year	Pop.	±% p.a.
1968	32	—
1975	38	+2.49%
1982	37	−0.38%
1990	41	+1.29%
1999	50	+2.23%
2007	82	+6.38%
2012	97	+3.42%
2017	83	−3.07%
2023	75	−1.68%
Source: INSEE

== See also ==
- Communes of the Somme department
