= Piennes-Onvillers =

- Commune
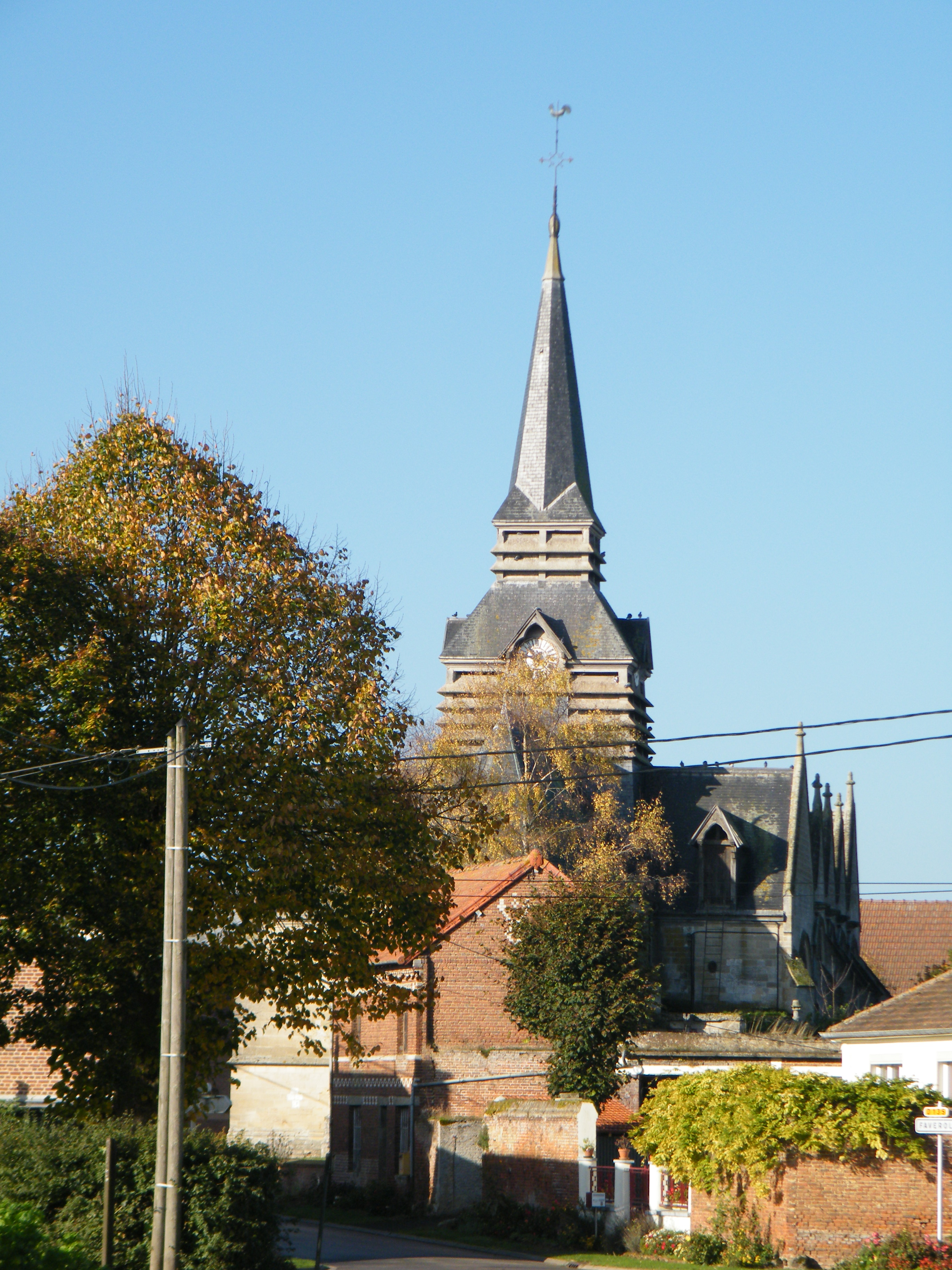
- The church in Piennes-Onvillers
- Location of Piennes-Onvillers
- Location within France Location within Hauts-de-France
- Coordinates: 49°37′50″N 2°38′33″E
- Country: France
- Region: Hauts-de-France
- Department: Somme
- Arrondissement: Montdidier
- Canton: Roye
- Intercommunality: CC Grand Roye

Government
  - Mayor (2020–2026): Brigitte Devismes
- Area^{1}: 12.29 km^{2} (4.75 sq mi)
- Elevation: 104 m (341 ft)
- Highest elevation: 119 m (390 ft)
- Lowest elevation: 82 m (269 ft)
- Population (2023): 391
  - Density: 31.8/km^{2} (82.4/sq mi)
- Time zone: UTC+01:00 (CET)
  - Summer (DST): UTC+02:00 (CEST)
- INSEE/Postal code: 80623 /80500
- ^{1} French Land Register data, which excludes lakes, ponds, glaciers > 1 km^{2} (0.386 sq mi or 247 acres) and river estuaries.

Piennes-Onvillers is a commune in the Somme department in Hauts-de-France in northern France. It was created in 1973 by the merger of two former communes: Piennes and Onvillers.

== Geography ==
The commune is situated on the D135 and D468 crossroads, some 25 miles (40 km) southeast of Amiens.

== Population ==
Historical population
Year	Pop.	±% p.a.
1968	334	—
1975	311	−1.01%
1982	291	−0.95%
1990	299	+0.34%
1999	336	+1.30%
2007	339	+0.11%
2012	357	+1.04%
2017	363	+0.33%
2023	391	+1.25%
Source: INSEE

== See also ==
- Communes of the Somme department
