= Andechy =

Commune in Hauts-de-France, France

- Commune
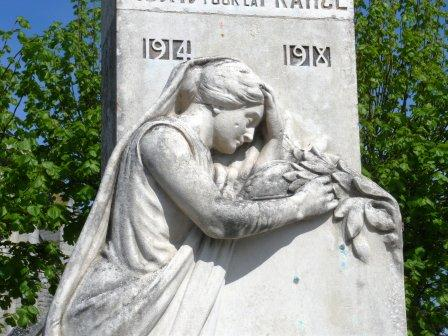
- The monument to the dead, at Andechy
- Location of Andechy
- Location within France Location within Hauts-de-France
- Coordinates: 49°42′56″N 2°42′36″E
- Country: France
- Region: Hauts-de-France
- Department: Somme
- Arrondissement: Montdidier
- Canton: Roye
- Intercommunality: CC Grand Roye

Government
  - Mayor (2020–2026): Sébastien Carpentier
- Area^{1}: 7.77 km^{2} (3.00 sq mi)
- Elevation: 103 m (338 ft)
- Highest elevation: 104 m (341 ft)
- Lowest elevation: 58 m (190 ft)
- Population (2023): 282
  - Density: 36.3/km^{2} (94.0/sq mi)
- Time zone: UTC+01:00 (CET)
  - Summer (DST): UTC+02:00 (CEST)
- INSEE/Postal code: 80023 /80700
- ^{1} French Land Register data, which excludes lakes, ponds, glaciers > 1 km^{2} (0.386 sq mi or 247 acres) and river estuaries.

Andechy (French pronunciation: [ɑ̃d(ə)ʃi]) is a commune in the Somme department in Hauts-de-France in northern France.

== Geography ==
The commune is situated 30 miles (48 km) southeast of Amiens at the junction of the D54 and D139, 3 miles (5 km) from the junction of the A1 autoroute du Nord.

== History ==
The village was completely destroyed during World War I.

== Population ==
Historical population
| Year | Pop. | ±% p.a. |
|---|---|---|
| 1968 | 186 | — |
| 1975 | 151 | −2.93% |
| 1982 | 173 | +1.96% |
| 1990 | 211 | +2.51% |
| 1999 | 212 | +0.05% |
| 2007 | 245 | +1.82% |
| 2012 | 263 | +1.43% |
| 2017 | 269 | +0.45% |
| 2023 | 282 | +0.79% |
Source: INSEE

== See also ==
Communes of the Somme department
