= Fescamps =

- Commune
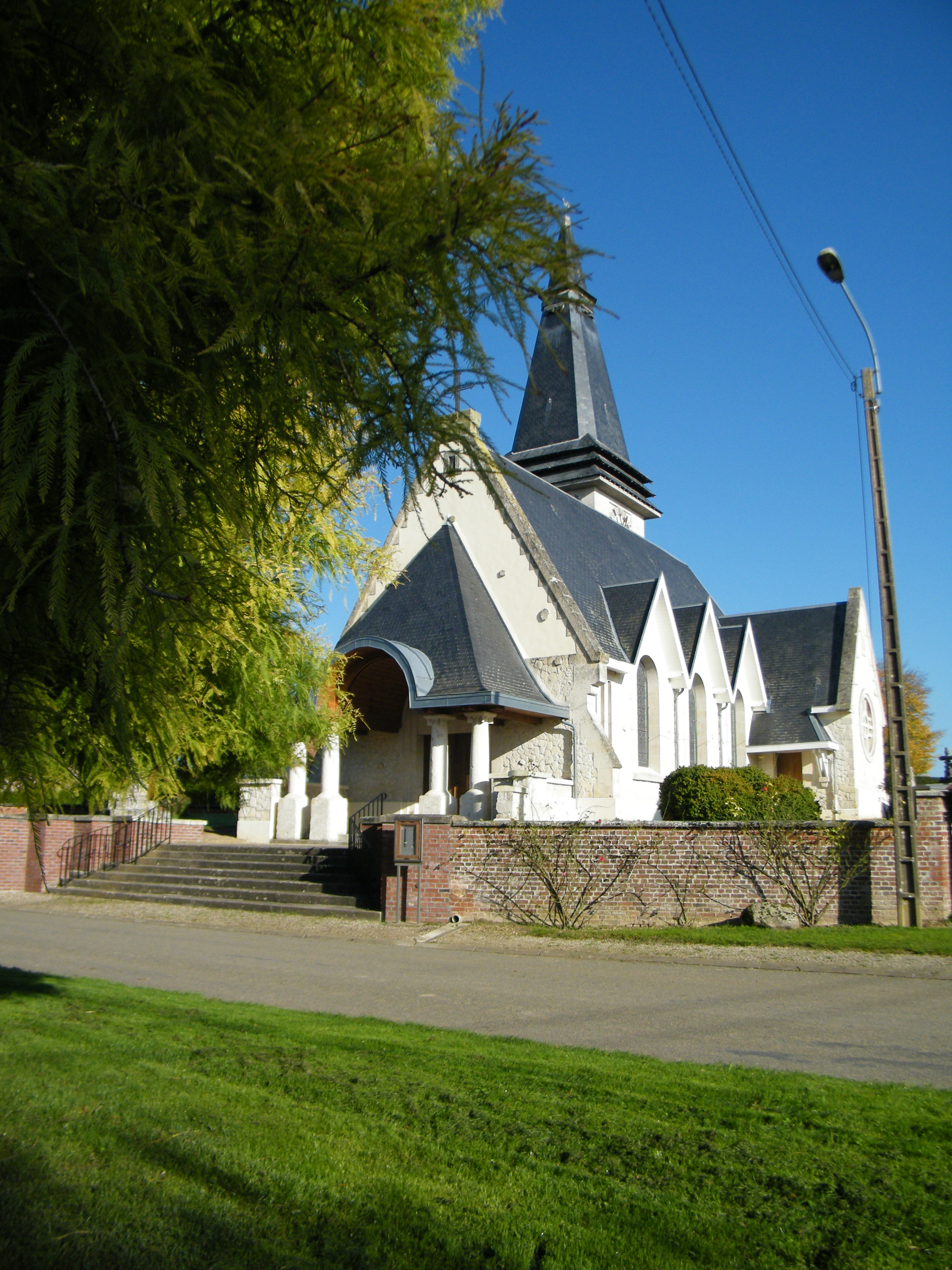
- The church in Fescamps
- Location of Fescamps
- Location within France Location within Hauts-de-France
- Coordinates: 49°38′27″N 2°41′02″E
- Country: France
- Region: Hauts-de-France
- Department: Somme
- Arrondissement: Montdidier
- Canton: Roye
- Intercommunality: CC Grand Roye

Government
  - Mayor (2020–2026): Pascal Lefèvre
- Area^{1}: 5.08 km^{2} (1.96 sq mi)
- Elevation: 100 m (330 ft)
- Highest elevation: 107 m (351 ft)
- Lowest elevation: 88 m (289 ft)
- Population (2023): 136
  - Density: 26.8/km^{2} (69.3/sq mi)
- Demonym: Fescampois·e
- Time zone: UTC+01:00 (CET)
  - Summer (DST): UTC+02:00 (CEST)
- INSEE/Postal code: 80306 /80500
- ^{1} French Land Register data, which excludes lakes, ponds, glaciers > 1 km^{2} (0.386 sq mi or 247 acres) and river estuaries.

Fescamps (French pronunciation: [fekɑ̃]; Picard: Fécamp) is a commune in the department of Somme in the administrative region of Hauts-de-France (before 2016: Picardy), northern France.

== Geography ==
Fescamps is situated on the D65 road, some 26 miles (42 km) southeast of Amiens.

== Population ==
Historical population
Year	Pop.	±% p.a.
1968	153	—
1975	134	−1.88%
1982	105	−3.42%
1990	133	+3.00%
1999	140	+0.57%
2007	143	+0.27%
2012	146	+0.42%
2017	138	−1.12%
2023	136	−0.24%
Source: INSEE

== See also ==
- Communes of the Somme department
