= Marquivillers =

- Commune
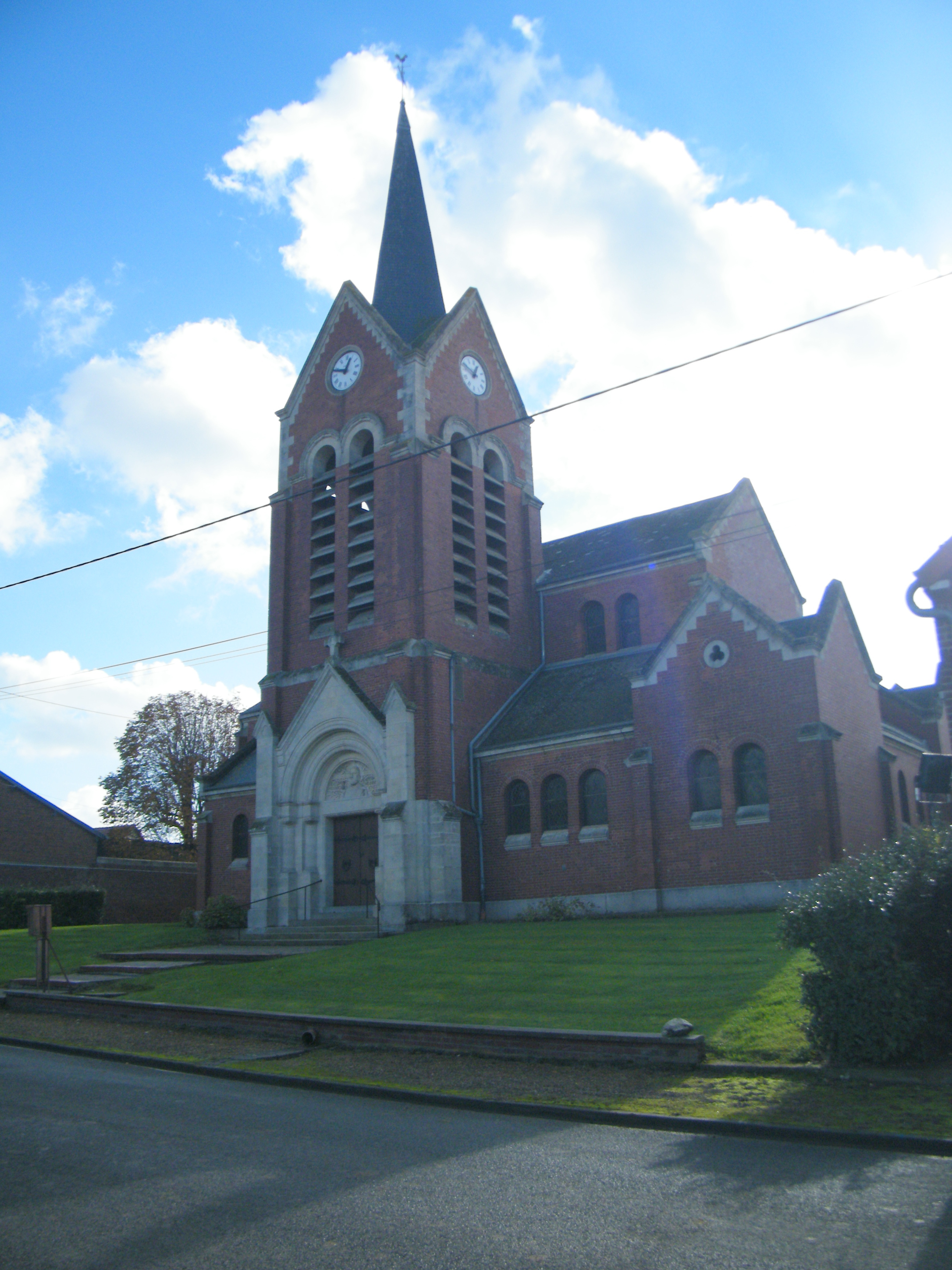
- The church in Marquivillers
- Location of Marquivillers
- Location within France Location within Hauts-de-France
- Coordinates: 49°40′29″N 2°41′41″E
- Country: France
- Region: Hauts-de-France
- Department: Somme
- Arrondissement: Montdidier
- Canton: Roye
- Intercommunality: CC Grand Roye

Government
  - Mayor (2020–2026): Jérôme Le Révérend
- Area^{1}: 5.78 km^{2} (2.23 sq mi)
- Elevation: 101 m (331 ft)
- Highest elevation: 100 m (330 ft)
- Lowest elevation: 58 m (190 ft)
- Population (2023): 189
  - Density: 32.7/km^{2} (84.7/sq mi)
- Time zone: UTC+01:00 (CET)
  - Summer (DST): UTC+02:00 (CEST)
- INSEE/Postal code: 80517 /80700
- ^{1} French Land Register data, which excludes lakes, ponds, glaciers > 1 km^{2} (0.386 sq mi or 247 acres) and river estuaries.

Marquivillers is a commune in the Somme department in Hauts-de-France in northern France.

== Geography ==
Marquivillers is situated on the D133 road, some 33 miles (53 km) southeast of Amiens.

== Population ==
Historical population
Year	Pop.	±% p.a.
1968	178	—
1975	157	−1.78%
1982	171	+1.23%
1990	155	−1.22%
1999	161	+0.42%
2007	156	−0.39%
2012	154	−0.26%
2017	188	+4.07%
2023	189	+0.09%
Source: INSEE

== See also ==
- Communes of the Somme department
