= Rubescourt =

- Commune
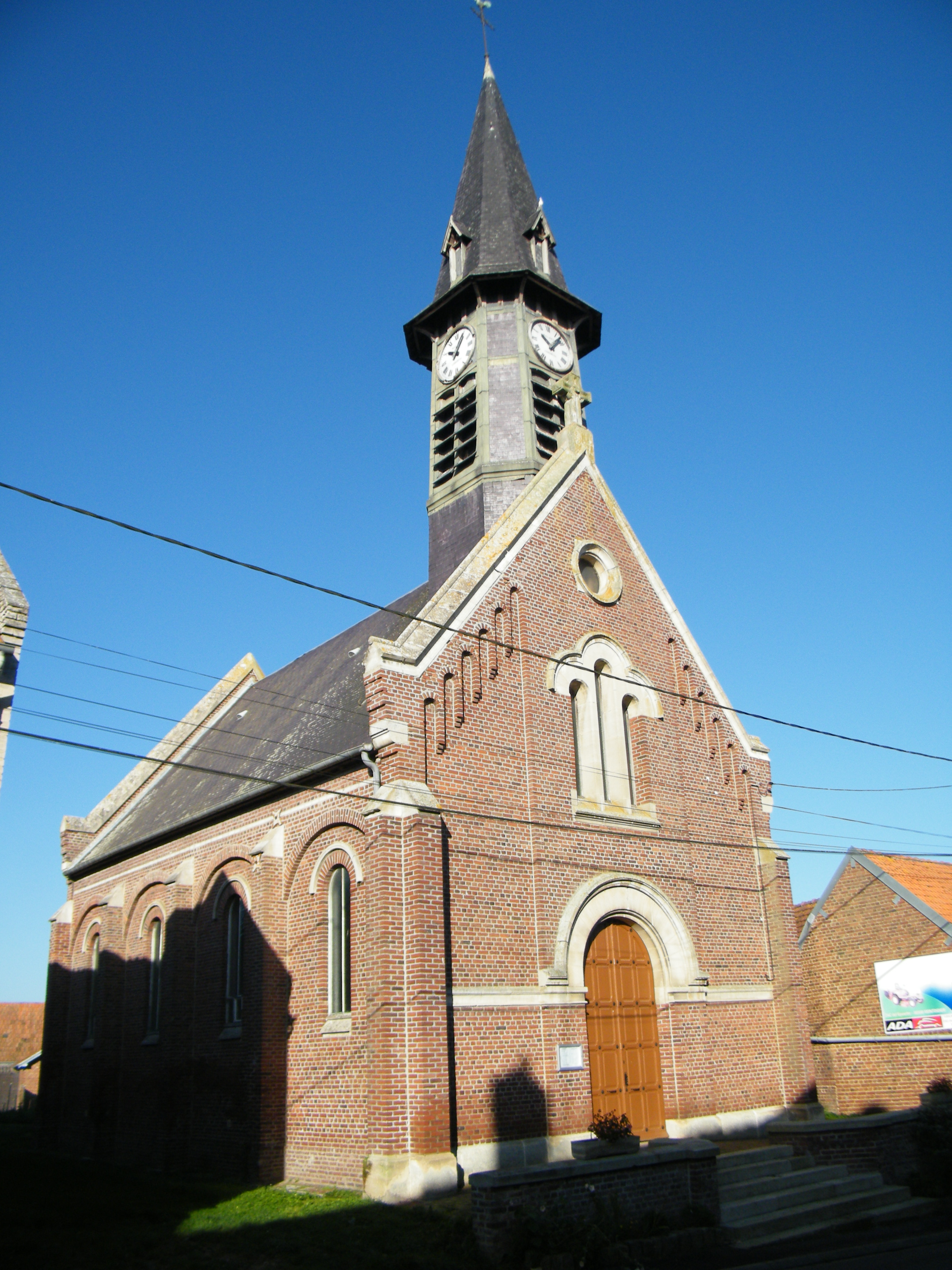
- The church in Rubescourt
- Location of Rubescourt
- Location within France Location within Hauts-de-France
- Coordinates: 49°36′26″N 2°34′21″E
- Country: France
- Region: Hauts-de-France
- Department: Somme
- Arrondissement: Montdidier
- Canton: Roye
- Intercommunality: CC Grand Roye

Government
  - Mayor (2020–2026): Chantal Desprez
- Area^{1}: 3.97 km^{2} (1.53 sq mi)
- Elevation: 97 m (318 ft)
- Highest elevation: 94 m (308 ft)
- Lowest elevation: 63 m (207 ft)
- Population (2023): 129
  - Density: 32.5/km^{2} (84.2/sq mi)
- Time zone: UTC+01:00 (CET)
  - Summer (DST): UTC+02:00 (CEST)
- INSEE/Postal code: 80687 /80500
- ^{1} French Land Register data, which excludes lakes, ponds, glaciers > 1 km^{2} (0.386 sq mi or 247 acres) and river estuaries.

Rubescourt is a commune in the Somme department in Hauts-de-France in northern France.

== Geography ==
Rubescourt is situated some 25 miles (40 km) southeast of Amiens, on the D214 road

== Population ==
Historical population
Year	Pop.	±% p.a.
1968	103	—
1975	85	−2.71%
1982	96	+1.75%
1990	126	+3.46%
1999	134	+0.69%
2007	133	−0.09%
2012	139	+0.89%
2017	134	−0.73%
2023	129	−0.63%
Source: INSEE

== See also ==
- Communes of the Somme department
