= Erches =

- Commune
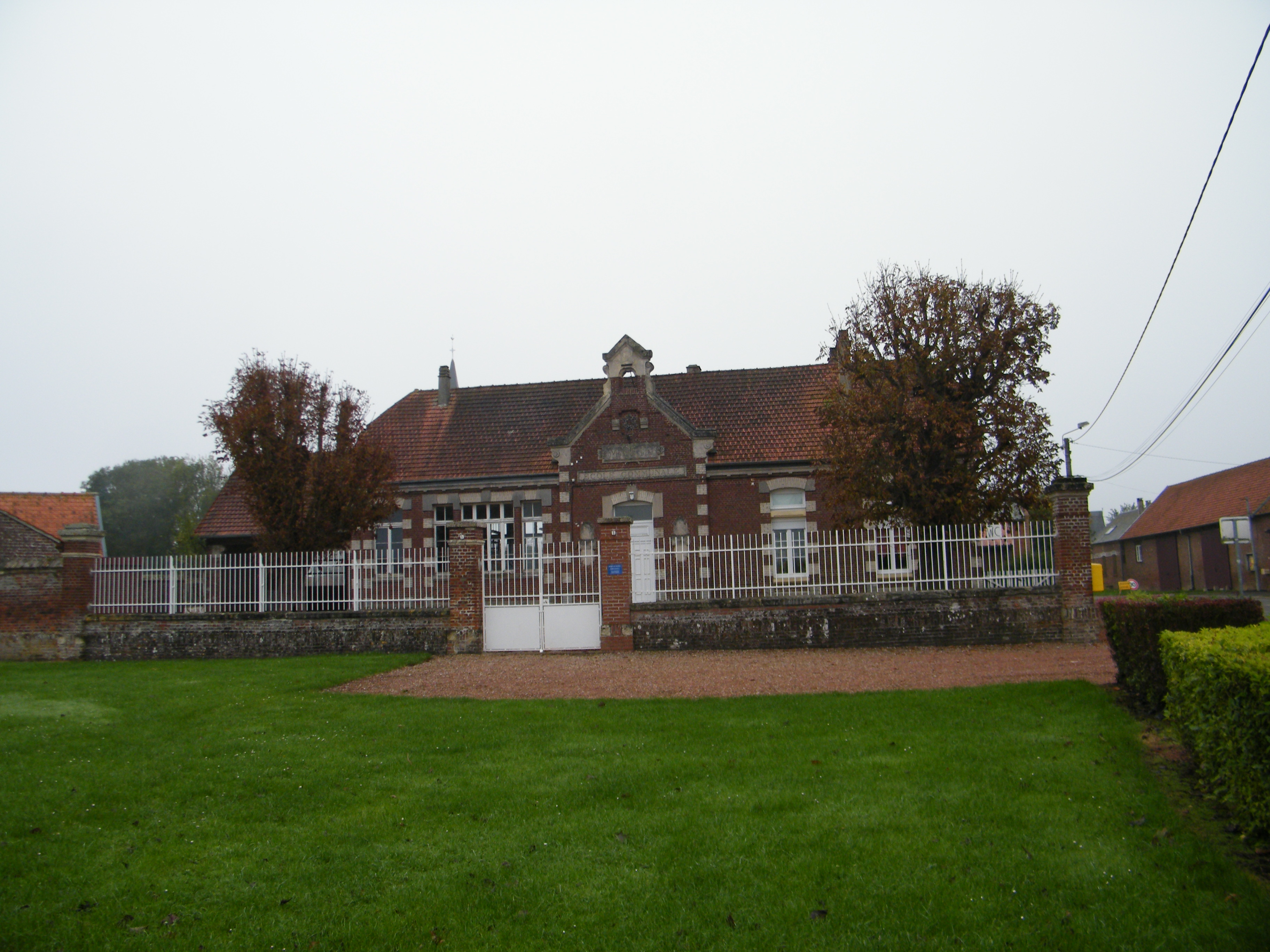
- Town hall
- Location of Erches
- Location within France Location within Hauts-de-France
- Coordinates: 49°43′24″N 2°40′18″E
- Country: France
- Region: Hauts-de-France
- Department: Somme
- Arrondissement: Montdidier
- Canton: Roye
- Intercommunality: CC Grand Roye

Government
  - Mayor (2020–2026): Xavier Balzot
- Area^{1}: 8.21 km^{2} (3.17 sq mi)
- Elevation: 96 m (315 ft)
- Highest elevation: 106 m (348 ft)
- Lowest elevation: 90 m (300 ft)
- Population (2023): 201
  - Density: 24.5/km^{2} (63.4/sq mi)
- Time zone: UTC+01:00 (CET)
  - Summer (DST): UTC+02:00 (CEST)
- INSEE/Postal code: 80278 /80500
- ^{1} French Land Register data, which excludes lakes, ponds, glaciers > 1 km^{2} (0.386 sq mi or 247 acres) and river estuaries.

Erches (French pronunciation: [ɛʁʃ]; Picard: Èrche) is a commune in the Somme department in Hauts-de-France in northern France.

== Geography ==
Erches is situated on the D54 road, some 5 miles (8 km) northwest of Roye.

== Population ==
Historical population
Year	Pop.	±% p.a.
1968	128	—
1975	109	−2.27%
1982	110	+0.13%
1990	104	−0.70%
1999	125	+2.06%
2007	163	+3.37%
2012	176	+1.55%
2017	187	+1.22%
2023	201	+1.21%
Source: INSEE

== See also ==
- Communes of the Somme department
