= Ayencourt =

- Commune
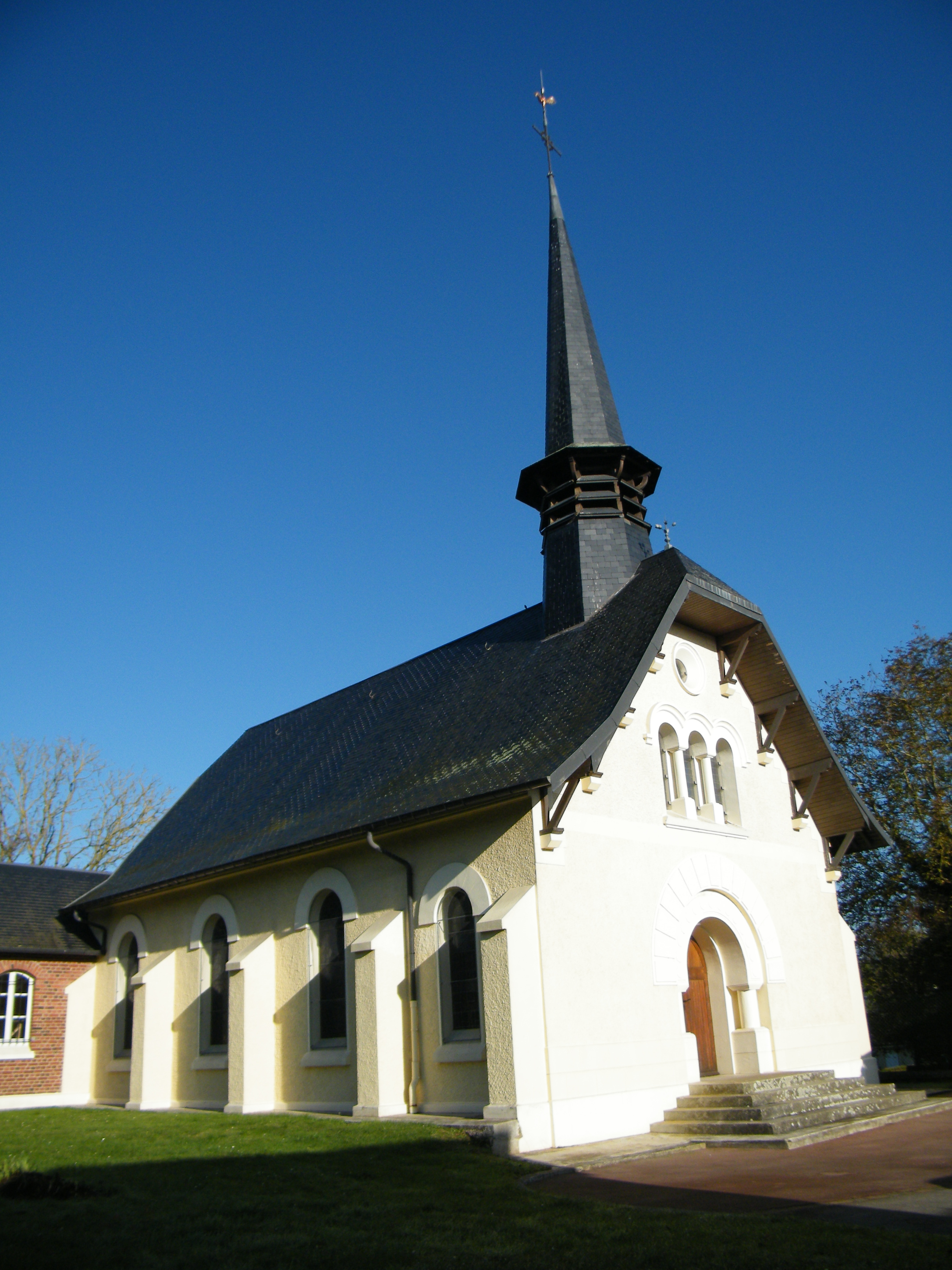
- The church in Ayencourt
- Location of Ayencourt
- Location within France Location within Hauts-de-France
- Coordinates: 49°37′33″N 2°33′20″E
- Country: France
- Region: Hauts-de-France
- Department: Somme
- Arrondissement: Montdidier
- Canton: Roye
- Intercommunality: CC Grand Roye

Government
  - Mayor (2020–2026): Brigitte Demarcy
- Area^{1}: 4.67 km^{2} (1.80 sq mi)
- Elevation: 67 m (220 ft)
- Highest elevation: 97 m (318 ft)
- Lowest elevation: 60 m (200 ft)
- Population (2023): 152
  - Density: 32.5/km^{2} (84.3/sq mi)
- Time zone: UTC+01:00 (CET)
  - Summer (DST): UTC+02:00 (CEST)
- INSEE/Postal code: 80049 /80500
- ^{1} French Land Register data, which excludes lakes, ponds, glaciers > 1 km^{2} (0.386 sq mi or 247 acres) and river estuaries.

Ayencourt is a commune in the Somme department in Hauts-de-France in northern France.

== See also ==
- Communes of the Somme department
