= Bouillancourt-la-Bataille =

- Commune
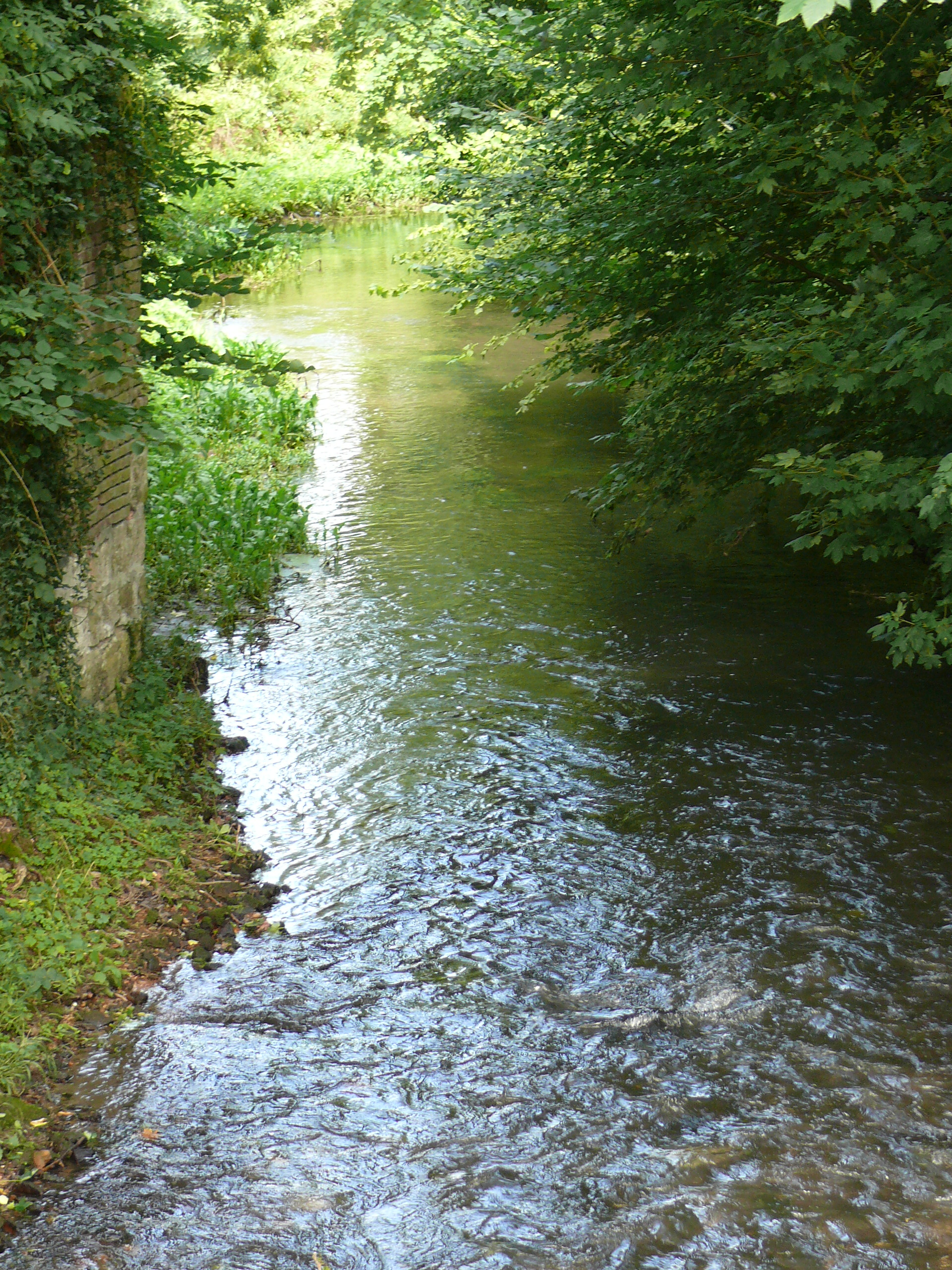
- The Trois Doms river in Bouillancourt
- Location of Bouillancourt-la-Bataille
- Location within France Location within Hauts-de-France
- Coordinates: 49°41′44″N 2°31′55″E
- Country: France
- Region: Hauts-de-France
- Department: Somme
- Arrondissement: Montdidier
- Canton: Roye
- Intercommunality: CC Grand Roye

Government
  - Mayor (2020–2026): Sylvain Pillon
- Area^{1}: 3.59 km^{2} (1.39 sq mi)
- Elevation: 50 m (160 ft)
- Highest elevation: 109 m (358 ft)
- Lowest elevation: 42 m (138 ft)
- Population (2023): 142
  - Density: 39.6/km^{2} (102/sq mi)
- Time zone: UTC+01:00 (CET)
  - Summer (DST): UTC+02:00 (CEST)
- INSEE/Postal code: 80121 /80500
- ^{1} French Land Register data, which excludes lakes, ponds, glaciers > 1 km^{2} (0.386 sq mi or 247 acres) and river estuaries.

Bouillancourt-la-Bataille (French pronunciation: [bujɑ̃kuʁ la bataj]; Picard: Bouillancourt-l’Batale) is a commune in the Somme department in Hauts-de-France in northern France.

== Geography ==
The communes is situated on the D155, D26 and D483 road junction, about 20 miles (32 km) southeast of Amiens.

== Population ==
Historical population
Year	Pop.	±% p.a.
1968	117	—
1975	109	−1.01%
1982	93	−2.24%
1990	89	−0.55%
1999	106	+1.96%
2007	142	+3.72%
2012	131	−1.60%
2017	155	+3.42%
2023	142	−1.45%
Source: INSEE

== See also ==
- Communes of the Somme department
