= Lignières, Somme =

Lignières
- Commune
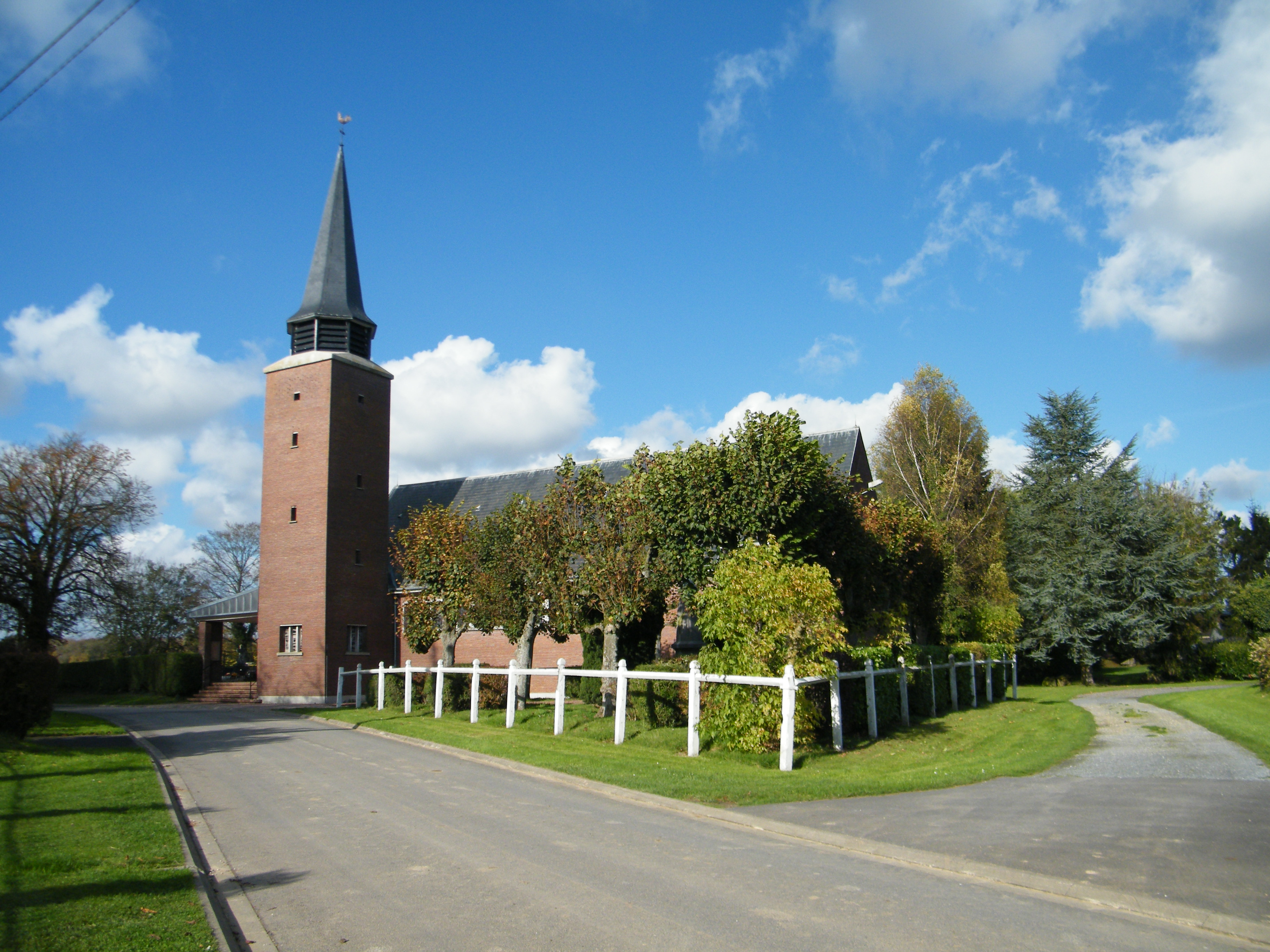
- The church in Lignières
- Location of Lignières
- Location within France Location within Hauts-de-France
- Coordinates: 49°40′39″N 2°39′12″E
- Country: France
- Region: Hauts-de-France
- Department: Somme
- Arrondissement: Montdidier
- Canton: Roye
- Intercommunality: Grand Roye

Government
  - Mayor (2020–2026): Marie-Lise Périn
- Area^{1}: 6.33 km^{2} (2.44 sq mi)
- Elevation: 1,100 m (3,600 ft)
- Highest elevation: 109 m (358 ft)
- Lowest elevation: 64 m (210 ft)
- Population (2023): 142
  - Density: 22.4/km^{2} (58.1/sq mi)
- Demonym(s): Lignièrois, Lignièroises
- Time zone: UTC+01:00 (CET)
  - Summer (DST): UTC+02:00 (CEST)
- INSEE/Postal code: 80478 /80500
- ^{1} French Land Register data, which excludes lakes, ponds, glaciers > 1 km^{2} (0.386 sq mi or 247 acres) and river estuaries.

Lignières (French pronunciation: [liɲjɛʁ]) is a commune in the Somme department in Hauts-de-France in northern France.

== Geography ==
The commune is situated on the D135e road, some 27 miles (43 km) southeast of Amiens.

== Population ==
Historical population
Year	Pop.	±% p.a.
1968	120	—
1975	88	−4.33%
1982	95	+1.10%
1990	108	+1.62%
1999	121	+1.27%
2007	140	+1.84%
2012	141	+0.14%
2017	137	−0.57%
2023	142	+0.60%
Source: INSEE

== See also ==
- Communes of the Somme department
