= Remaugies =

- Commune
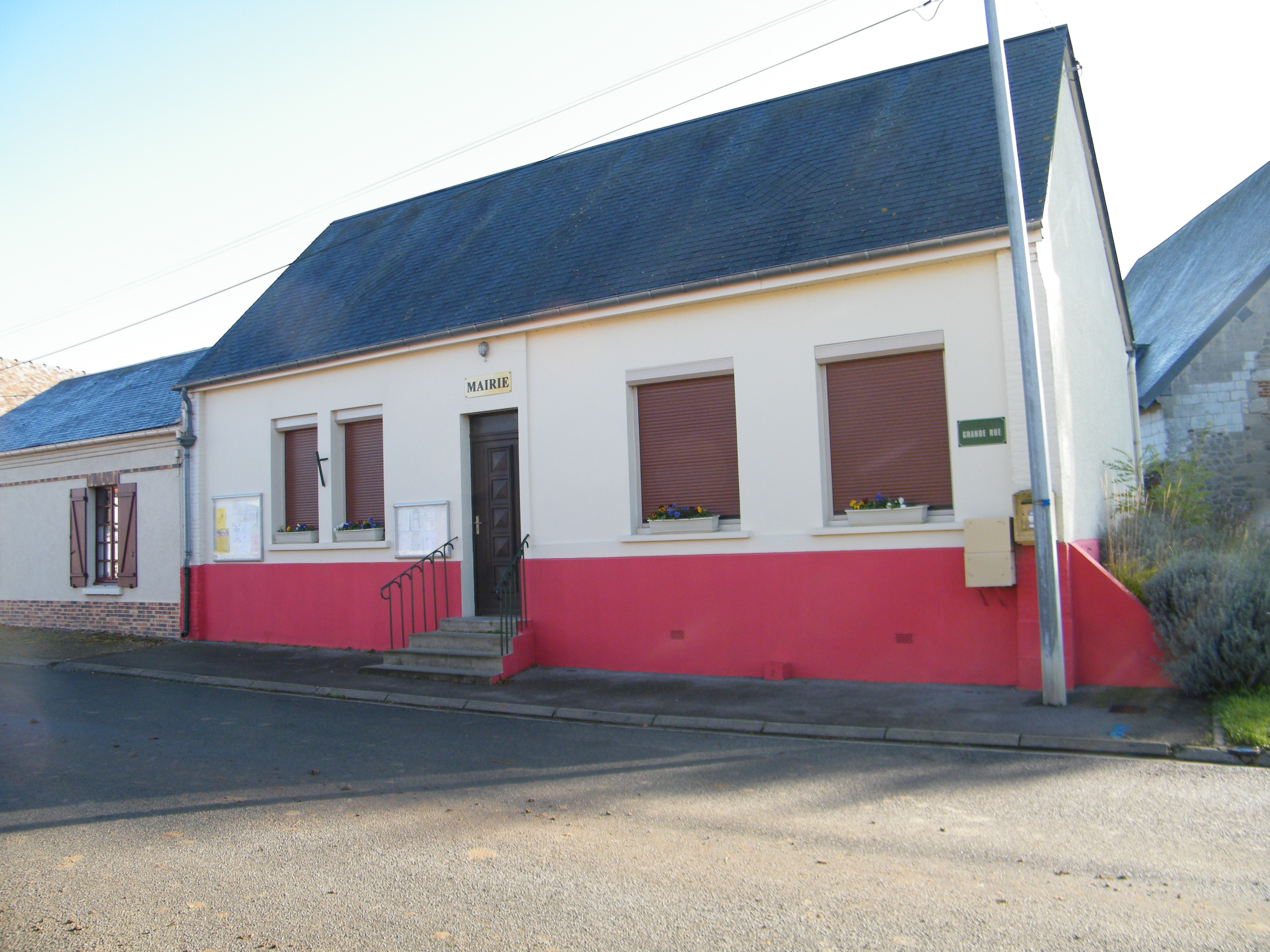
- The town hall in Remaugies
- Location of Remaugies
- Location within France Location within Hauts-de-France
- Coordinates: 49°37′43″N 2°40′02″E
- Country: France
- Region: Hauts-de-France
- Department: Somme
- Arrondissement: Montdidier
- Canton: Roye
- Intercommunality: CC Grand Roye

Government
  - Mayor (2020–2026): Eymeric Bizet
- Area^{1}: 4.14 km^{2} (1.60 sq mi)
- Elevation: 103 m (338 ft)
- Highest elevation: 115 m (377 ft)
- Lowest elevation: 89 m (292 ft)
- Population (2023): 137
  - Density: 33.1/km^{2} (85.7/sq mi)
- Time zone: UTC+01:00 (CET)
  - Summer (DST): UTC+02:00 (CEST)
- INSEE/Postal code: 80667 /80500
- ^{1} French Land Register data, which excludes lakes, ponds, glaciers > 1 km^{2} (0.386 sq mi or 247 acres) and river estuaries.

Remaugies (French pronunciation: [ʁəmoʒi]) is a commune in the Somme department in Hauts-de-France in northern France.

== Geography ==
Situated about 36 miles (58 km) southeast of Amiens, on the D68 road

== Population ==
Historical population
Year	Pop.	±% p.a.
1968	114	—
1975	89	−3.47%
1982	87	−0.32%
1990	81	−0.89%
1999	97	+2.02%
2007	115	+2.15%
2012	119	+0.69%
2017	132	+2.10%
2023	137	+0.62%
Source: INSEE

== See also ==
- Communes of the Somme department
