= Ételfay =

- Commune
- Location of Ételfay
- Location within France Location within Hauts-de-France
- Coordinates: 49°39′44″N 2°37′11″E
- Country: France
- Region: Hauts-de-France
- Department: Somme
- Arrondissement: Montdidier
- Canton: Roye
- Intercommunality: CC Grand Roye

Government
  - Mayor (2020–2026): Marie-Line Bailleul
- Area^{1}: 8.12 km^{2} (3.14 sq mi)
- Elevation: 105 m (344 ft)
- Highest elevation: 110 m (360 ft)
- Lowest elevation: 88 m (289 ft)
- Population (2023): 348
  - Density: 42.9/km^{2} (111/sq mi)
- Time zone: UTC+01:00 (CET)
  - Summer (DST): UTC+02:00 (CEST)
- INSEE/Postal code: 80293 /80500
- ^{1} French Land Register data, which excludes lakes, ponds, glaciers > 1 km^{2} (0.386 sq mi or 247 acres) and river estuaries.

Ételfay (French pronunciation: [etɛlfɛ]; Picard: Tèrfayin) is a commune in the Somme department in Hauts-de-France in northern France.

== Geography ==
Ételfay is situated on the D135e road, some 38 km (24 mi) southeast of Amiens.

== Population ==
Historical population
Year	Pop.	±% p.a.
1968	284	—
1975	250	−1.81%
1982	261	+0.62%
1990	362	+4.17%
1999	391	+0.86%
2007	373	−0.59%
2012	396	+1.20%
2017	378	−0.93%
2023	348	−1.37%
Source: INSEE

== See also ==
- Communes of the Somme department
