= Étalon, Somme =

Étalon
- Commune
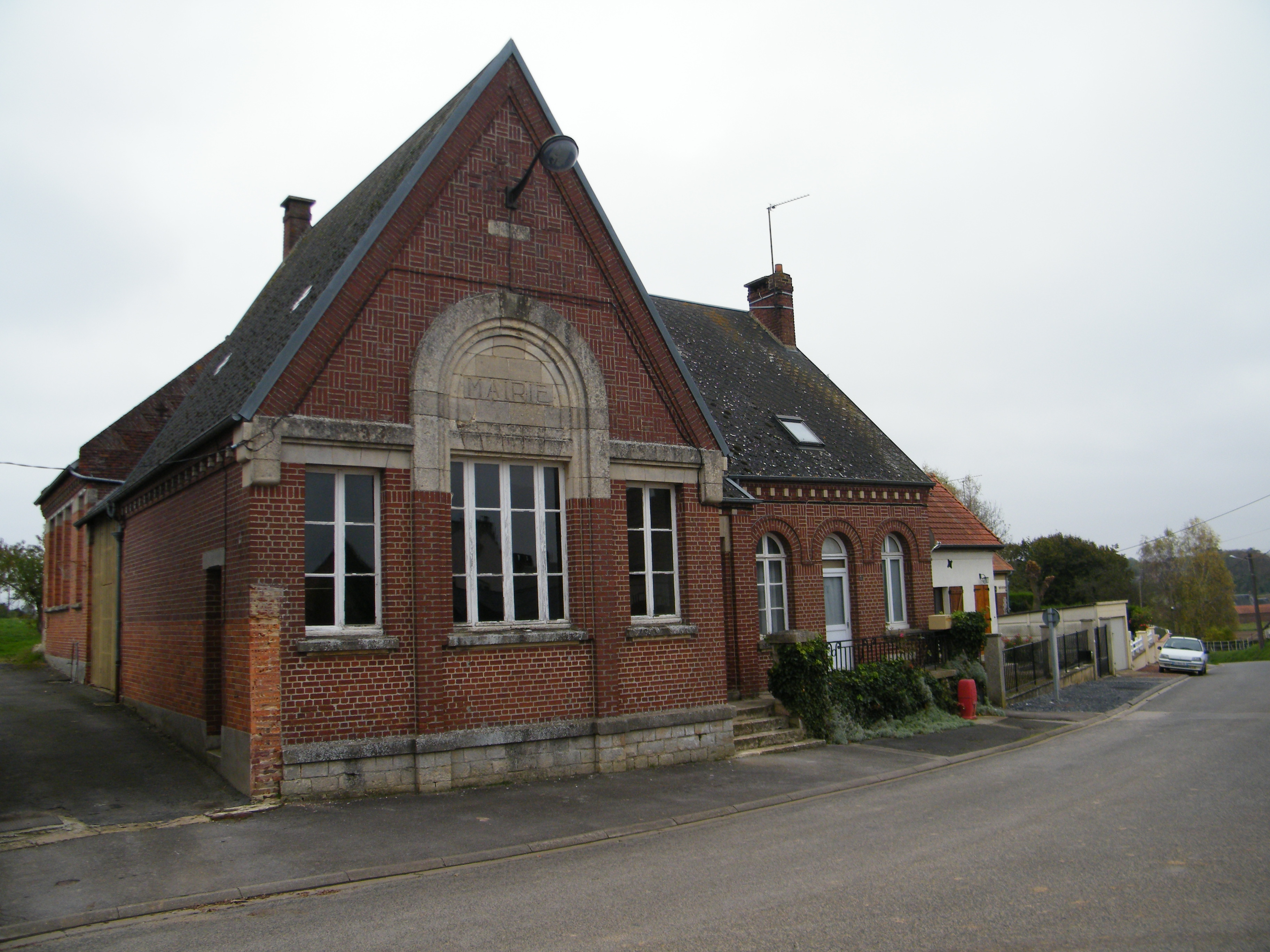
- Town hall
- Location of Étalon
- Location within France Location within Hauts-de-France
- Coordinates: 49°45′51″N 2°51′25″E
- Country: France
- Region: Hauts-de-France
- Department: Somme
- Arrondissement: Montdidier
- Canton: Roye
- Intercommunality: CC Grand Roye

Government
  - Mayor (2020–2026): Francis Housse
- Area^{1}: 4.56 km^{2} (1.76 sq mi)
- Highest elevation: 89 m (292 ft)
- Lowest elevation: 62 m (203 ft)
- Population (2023): 126
  - Density: 27.6/km^{2} (71.6/sq mi)
- Time zone: UTC+01:00 (CET)
  - Summer (DST): UTC+02:00 (CEST)
- INSEE/Postal code: 80292 /80190
- ^{1} French Land Register data, which excludes lakes, ponds, glaciers > 1 km^{2} (0.386 sq mi or 247 acres) and river estuaries.

Étalon (French pronunciation: [etalɔ̃]) is a commune in the Somme department in Hauts-de-France situated in northern France.

== Geography ==
Étalon is situated on the D139 road, 9 km (5.6 mi) northeast of Roye and 42 km (26 mi) east-southeast of Amiens.

== Places of interest ==
- Remains of Gallo-Roman villas
- Tomb of a soldier of the Crusades

== Population ==
Historical population
Year	Pop.	±% p.a.
1968	127	—
1975	107	−2.42%
1982	104	−0.41%
1990	116	+1.37%
1999	112	−0.39%
2007	143	+3.10%
2012	137	−0.85%
2017	136	−0.15%
2023	126	−1.26%
Source: INSEE

== See also ==
- Communes of the Somme department
