= Grivillers =

- Commune
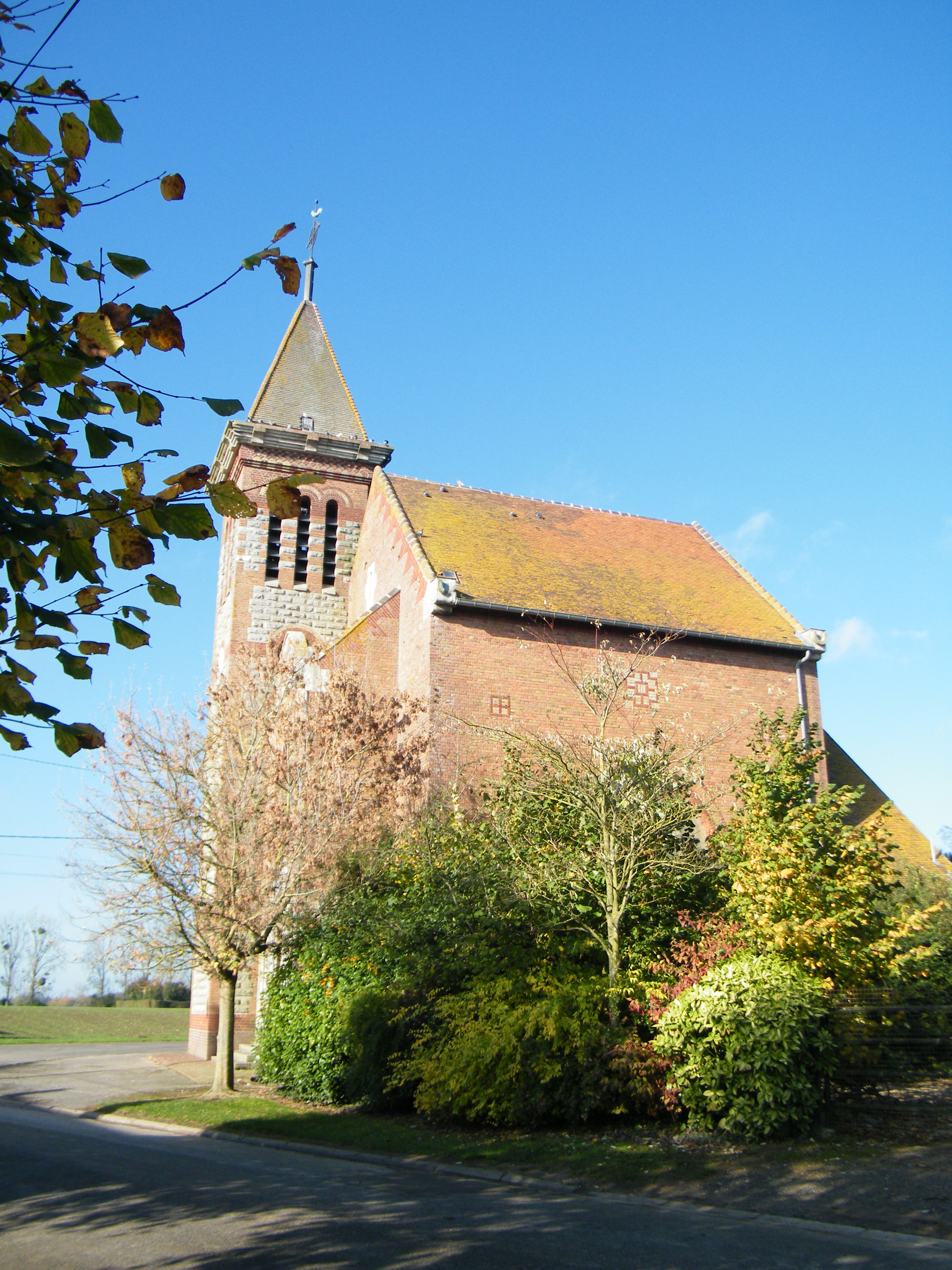
- The church in Grivillers
- Location of Grivillers
- Location within France Location within Hauts-de-France
- Coordinates: 49°39′43″N 2°42′29″E
- Country: France
- Region: Hauts-de-France
- Department: Somme
- Arrondissement: Montdidier
- Canton: Roye
- Intercommunality: CC Grand Roye

Government
  - Mayor (2020–2026): Pierre Goussen
- Area^{1}: 3.39 km^{2} (1.31 sq mi)
- Elevation: 97 m (318 ft)
- Highest elevation: 102 m (335 ft)
- Lowest elevation: 87 m (285 ft)
- Population (2023): 91
  - Density: 27/km^{2} (70/sq mi)
- Time zone: UTC+01:00 (CET)
  - Summer (DST): UTC+02:00 (CEST)
- INSEE/Postal code: 80391 /80700
- ^{1} French Land Register data, which excludes lakes, ponds, glaciers > 1 km^{2} (0.386 sq mi or 247 acres) and river estuaries.

Grivillers is a commune in the Somme department in Hauts-de-France in northern France.

== Geography ==
Grivillers is situated on the D930 road, some 25 miles (40 km) southeast of Amiens.

== Population ==
Historical population
Year	Pop.	±% p.a.
1968	69	—
1975	59	−2.21%
1982	52	−1.79%
1990	62	+2.22%
1999	61	−0.18%
2007	59	−0.42%
2012	73	+4.35%
2017	86	+3.33%
2023	91	+0.95%
Source: INSEE

== See also ==
- Communes of the Somme department
