= Canton of Montdidier =

Coordinates: 49°38′55″N 2°34′15″E

Montdidier
- Former canton
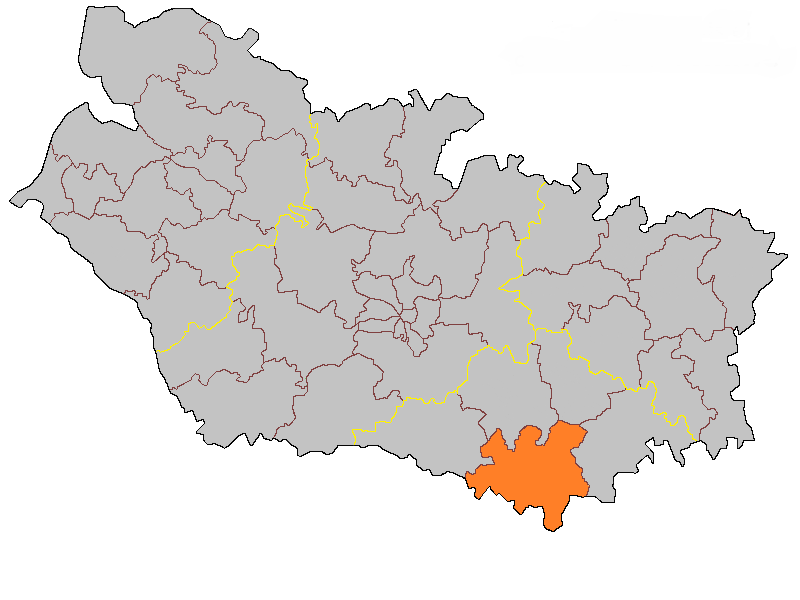
- Country: France
- Region: Hauts-de-France
- Department: Somme
- No. of communes: {{{nbcomm}}}
- Disbanded: 2015
- Area: 213.66 km^{2} (82.49 sq mi)
- Population (2012): 12,605
  - Density: 58.996/km^{2} (152.80/sq mi)

The Canton of Montdidier is a former canton situated in the department of the Somme and in the Picardie region of northern France. It was disbanded following the French canton reorganisation which came into effect in March 2015. It consisted of 34 communes, which joined the canton of Roye in 2015. It had 12,605 inhabitants (2012).

== Geography ==
The canton is organised around the commune of Montdidier in the arrondissement of Montdidier. The altitude varies from 40m (Hargicourt) to 155m (Villers-Tournelle) for an average of 121m.

The canton comprised 34 communes:

- Andechy
- Assainvillers
- Ayencourt
- Becquigny
- Bouillancourt-la-Bataille
- Boussicourt
- Bus-la-Mésière
- Cantigny
- Le Cardonnois
- Courtemanche
- Davenescourt
- Erches
- Ételfay
- Faverolles
- Fescamps
- Fignières
- Fontaine-sous-Montdidier
- Gratibus
- Grivillers
- Guerbigny
- Hargicourt
- Laboissière-en-Santerre
- Lignières
- Malpart
- Marestmontiers
- Marquivillers
- Mesnil-Saint-Georges
- Montdidier
- Piennes-Onvillers
- Remaugies
- Rollot
- Rubescourt
- Villers-Tournelle
- Warsy

== Population ==
Population Growth
1962	1968	1975	1982	1990	1999
10304	11215	11051	11043	11414	11969
Census count starting from 1962 : Population without double counting

== See also ==
- Arrondissements of the Somme department
- Cantons of the Somme department
- Communes of the Somme department
