= Courtemanche (disambiguation) =

Courtemanche is a French commune.

Courtemanche may also refer to:

- Courtemanche (surname)
- 63129 Courtemanche, main-belt asteroid
- Augustin le Gardeur de Courtemanche
