= Beuvraignes =

- Commune
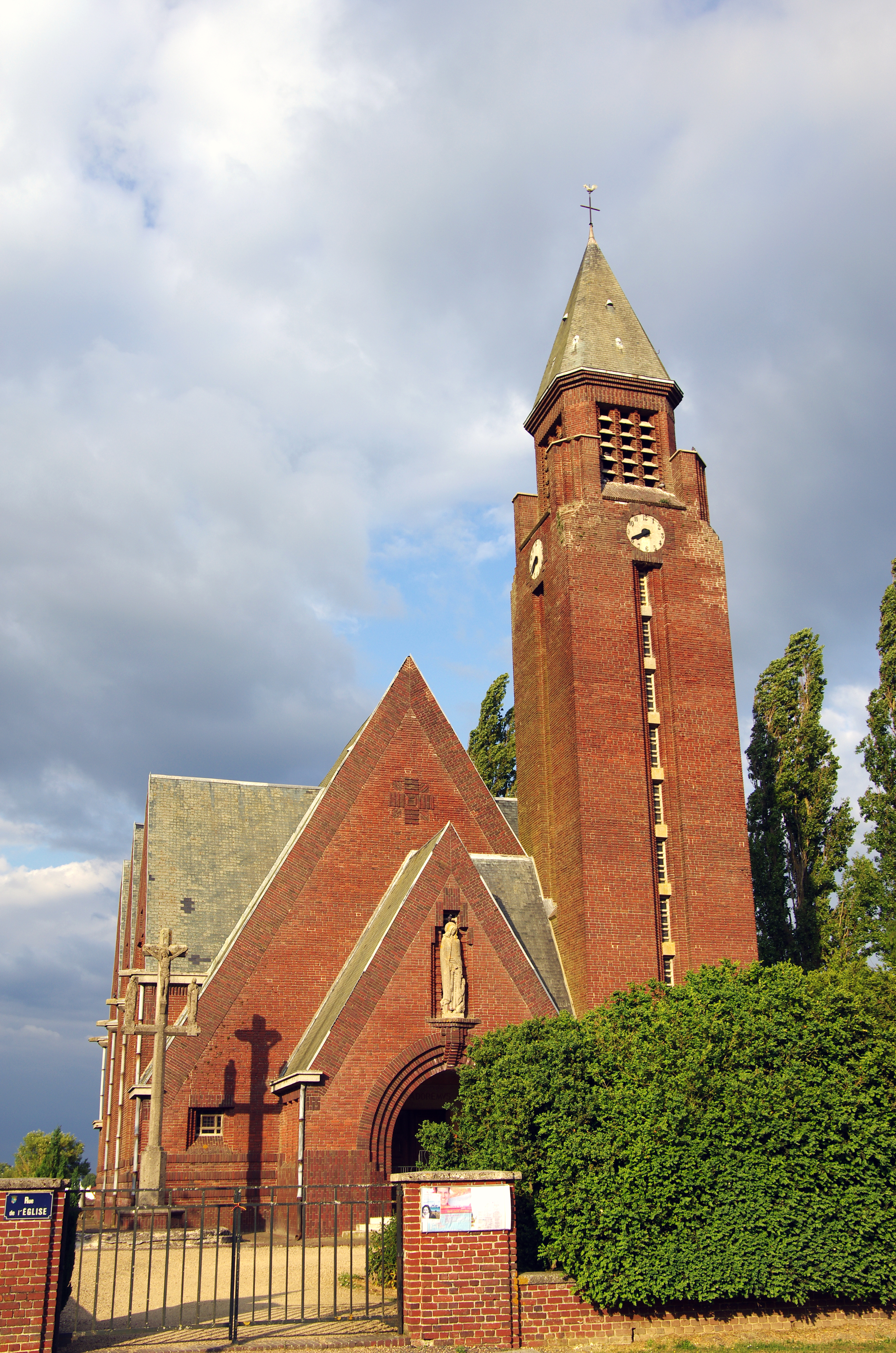
- The church in Beuvraignes
- Location of Beuvraignes
- Location within France Location within Hauts-de-France
- Coordinates: 49°38′45″N 2°46′09″E
- Country: France
- Region: Hauts-de-France
- Department: Somme
- Arrondissement: Montdidier
- Canton: Roye
- Intercommunality: CC Grand Roye

Government
  - Mayor (2020–2026): Bernard Dupuis
- Area^{1}: 14.45 km^{2} (5.58 sq mi)
- Elevation: 91 m (299 ft)
- Highest elevation: 104 m (341 ft)
- Lowest elevation: 77 m (253 ft)
- Population (2023): 900
  - Density: 62/km^{2} (160/sq mi)
- Time zone: UTC+01:00 (CET)
  - Summer (DST): UTC+02:00 (CEST)
- INSEE/Postal code: 80101 /80700
- ^{1} French Land Register data, which excludes lakes, ponds, glaciers > 1 km^{2} (0.386 sq mi or 247 acres) and river estuaries.

Beuvraignes (French pronunciation: [bœvʁɛɲ]) is a commune in the Somme department in Hauts-de-France in northern France.

== Geography ==
Beuvraignes is situated on the D133 road, some 30 miles (48 km) southeast of Amiens, the town of Beuvraignes is situated in the centre of Hauts-de-France, to the extreme southeast of the fertile plain of the Santerre. Of linear growth, the town sits between Tilloloy, on the other side of the N17, the A1 autoroute and the TGV railway line and, on the other side, by Crapeaumesnil.

Beuvraignes is 5 miles (8 km) from Roye and 10 miles to the east of Montdidier.

Bounded by 10 other commune territories (four belong to the Somme department and six to the Oise), the population is divided up between the principal town and three hamlets, l’Abbaye, Cessier and Loges. The terrain around Beuvraignes forms a gently rippled plateau limited by the valley of the Matz.

== Etymology of the name of the commune ==
Beverinae (1048), Bevrigne (1148), Buvrigne (1184), Buveringnes (1300), Buvregnes (1362), Buveraines (1564), Buvringe (1625), Buverainge (1666), Beuvreines (1743), Beuvraignes (1767)

== History ==
Different discoveries of the 19th century proved the Gallo-Roman origins of the town. Finds include pottery kilns and effigies of Nero and Posthumous. At this time, the territory was populated by the Veromandues, a Gallic tribe of Belgian origin, who lived in an environment of woodland and marshes. In the 13th century, Beuvraignes appears in the archives of the abbey of St. Eloi of Noyon, under which control it remained until the 18th century. Most people were peasant farmers paying dues to the abbey. Life was hard during the medieval period in the north of France, in between famines and the invasions of the English, Burgundians and the Spanish. Things changed little during the French Revolution for the peasants. The church was requisitioned and transformed into a gunpowder factory. The locals pleaded for their lord of the manor of Tilloloy, but he was guillotined under The Terror.

The 19th century was more kind to the people of the territory. Economic development and abundant harvests, the building of the castle at Loges (home to the baron of Septenville in 1798), the hiring of 2 teachers (rare in a rural environment under the Empire), installation of paving and a square for the town centre, a new chapel in 1867, the creation of the railway line between Roye and Compiègne, with a train station in the town (1879) and finally, the inauguration of a telegraph office in May 1900.

World War I broke the momentum, as, early in 1915, the town was razed and reduced to ashes. In 1919 when the first inhabitants returned, they discovered the town was more like a lunar landscape. It took 10 years to recover the fertility of the land and for the trees to flower and fruit again. Each year, farmers still find military traces of that terrible war. During World War II, the town was under Nazi occupation and classified as the forbidden zone. Beuvraignes had two prisoner-of-war camps. Some inhabitants were arrested and never returned from the Nazi camps.

Nowadays, the town’s economy consists of a bakers, a horticulturist, two plumbers, a mattress maker, a glass-fibre factory) and several other businesses.

== Monuments ==
- Beuvraignes military cemetery

== Population ==
Historical population
Year	Pop.	±% p.a.
1968	660	—
1975	623	−0.82%
1982	603	−0.47%
1990	610	+0.14%
1999	694	+1.44%
2007	785	+1.55%
2012	844	+1.46%
2017	860	+0.38%
2023	900	+0.76%
Source: INSEE

== See also ==
- Communes of the Somme department
