= Courtemanche (surname) =

Courtemanche is a French surname derived from various places in France named Courtemanche and Courdemanche (ultimately derived from Latin cortis dominica, "lord’s farm or estate").

Notable people with the surname include:

- David Courtemanche (born 1964), Canadian politician
- Gil Courtemanche (1943–2011), Canadian journalist and writer
- Henri Courtemanche (1916–1986), Canadian politician
- Michel Courtemanche (born 1964), Canadian comedian and actor
