= Balâtre =

- Commune
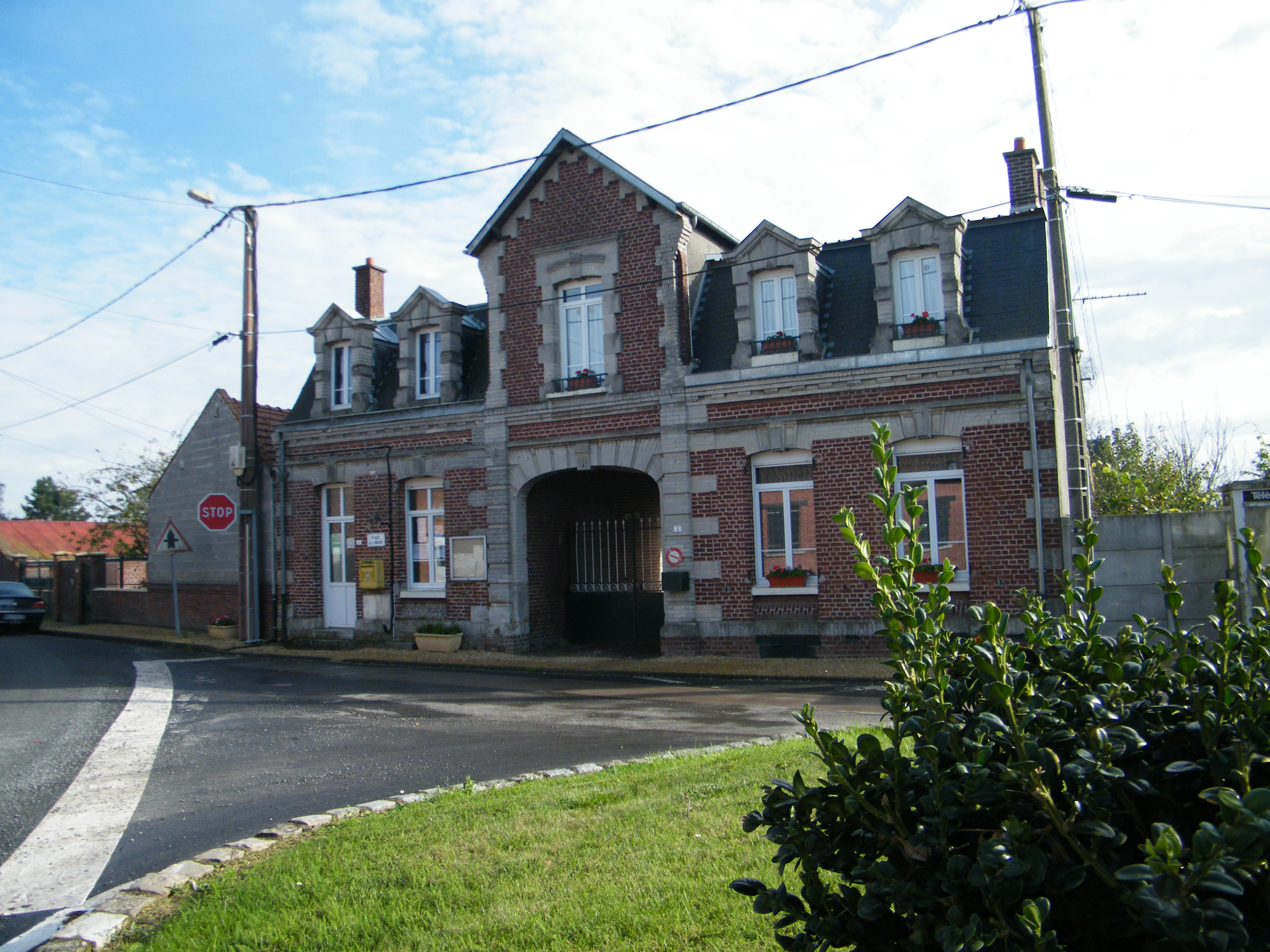
- The town hall of Balâtre
- Location of Balâtre
- Location within France Location within Hauts-de-France
- Coordinates: 49°42′38″N 2°52′12″E
- Country: France
- Region: Hauts-de-France
- Department: Somme
- Arrondissement: Montdidier
- Canton: Roye
- Intercommunality: CC Grand Roye

Government
  - Mayor (2020–2026): Thomas Basset
- Area^{1}: 3.3 km^{2} (1.3 sq mi)
- Elevation: 82 m (269 ft)
- Highest elevation: 94 m (308 ft)
- Lowest elevation: 82 m (269 ft)
- Population (2023): 78
  - Density: 24/km^{2} (61/sq mi)
- Time zone: UTC+01:00 (CET)
  - Summer (DST): UTC+02:00 (CEST)
- INSEE/Postal code: 80053 /80700
- ^{1} French Land Register data, which excludes lakes, ponds, glaciers > 1 km^{2} (0.386 sq mi or 247 acres) and river estuaries.

Balâtre (French pronunciation: [balatʁ]) is a commune in the Somme department in Hauts-de-France in northern France.

== Geography ==
A small farming village, situated 6.4 kilometres (6 miles) to the east of Roye, on the D248 road.

== Population ==
Historical population
Year	Pop.	±% p.a.
1968	86	—
1975	88	+0.33%
1982	72	−2.83%
1990	69	−0.53%
1999	54	−2.69%
2007	84	+5.68%
2012	84	+0.00%
2017	72	−3.04%
2023	78	+1.34%
Source: INSEE

== See also ==
- Communes of the Somme department
