= L'Échelle-Saint-Aurin =

- Commune
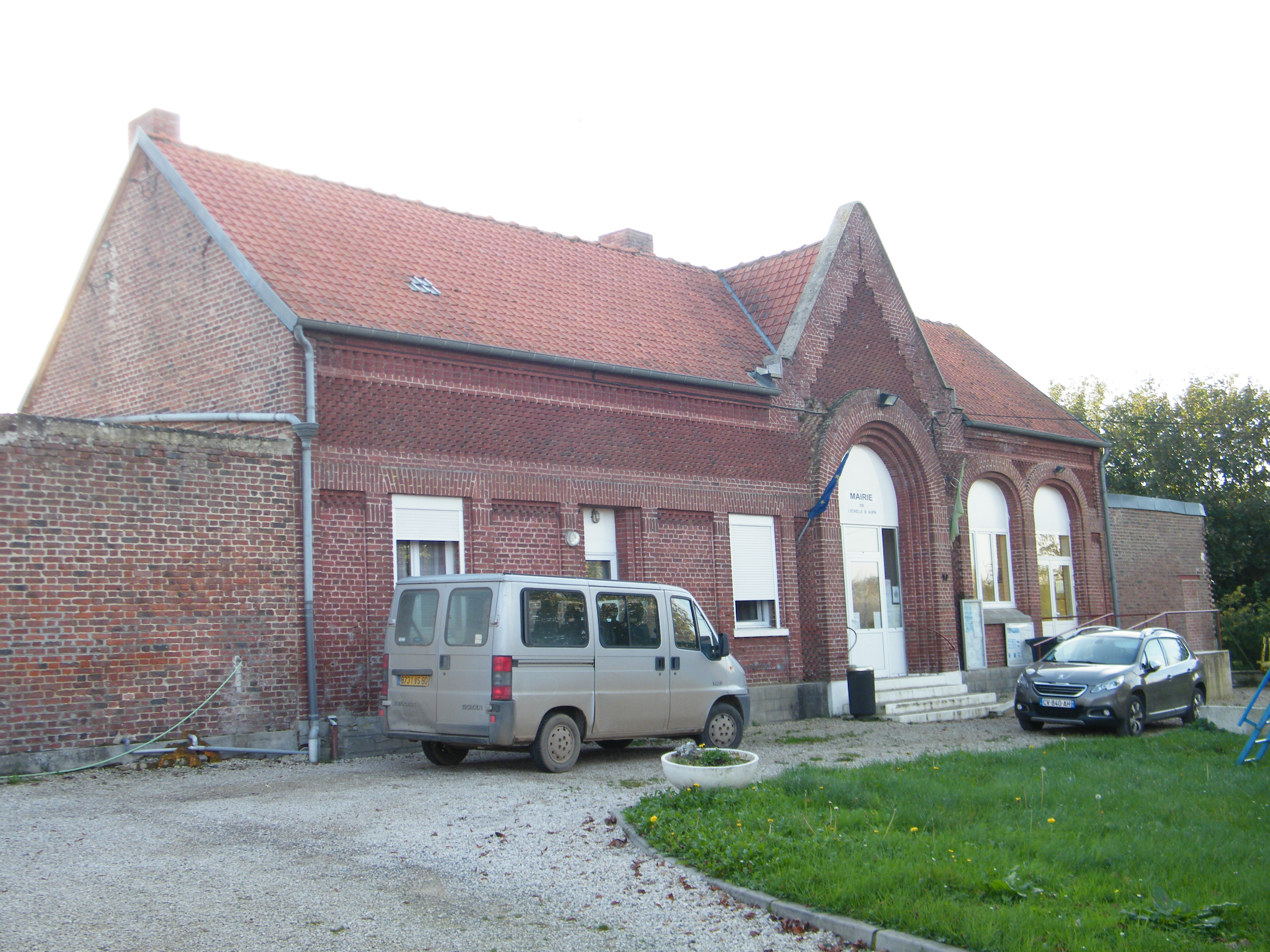
- Town hall
- Location of L'Échelle-Saint-Aurin
- Location within France Location within Hauts-de-France
- Coordinates: 49°41′44″N 2°42′43″E
- Country: France
- Region: Hauts-de-France
- Department: Somme
- Arrondissement: Montdidier
- Canton: Roye
- Intercommunality: Grand Roye

Government
  - Mayor (2020–2026): Jean-Marie Carré
- Area^{1}: 5.1 km^{2} (2.0 sq mi)
- Elevation: 64 m (210 ft)
- Highest elevation: 97 m (318 ft)
- Lowest elevation: 61 m (200 ft)
- Population (2023): 43
  - Density: 8.4/km^{2} (22/sq mi)
- Time zone: UTC+01:00 (CET)
  - Summer (DST): UTC+02:00 (CEST)
- INSEE/Postal code: 80263 /80700
- ^{1} French Land Register data, which excludes lakes, ponds, glaciers > 1 km^{2} (0.386 sq mi or 247 acres) and river estuaries.

L'Échelle-Saint-Aurin is a commune in the Somme department in Hauts-de-France in northern France.

== Geography ==
The commune is situated 32 kilometres (20 mi) southeast of Amiens on the D54, and on the banks of the Avre, 3 kilometres (2 mi) from the A1 autoroute.

== Population ==
Historical population
Year	Pop.	±% p.a.
1968	71	—
1975	72	+0.20%
1982	74	+0.39%
1990	62	−2.19%
1999	50	−2.36%
2007	55	+1.20%
2012	56	+0.36%
2017	53	−1.10%
2023	43	−3.42%
Source: INSEE

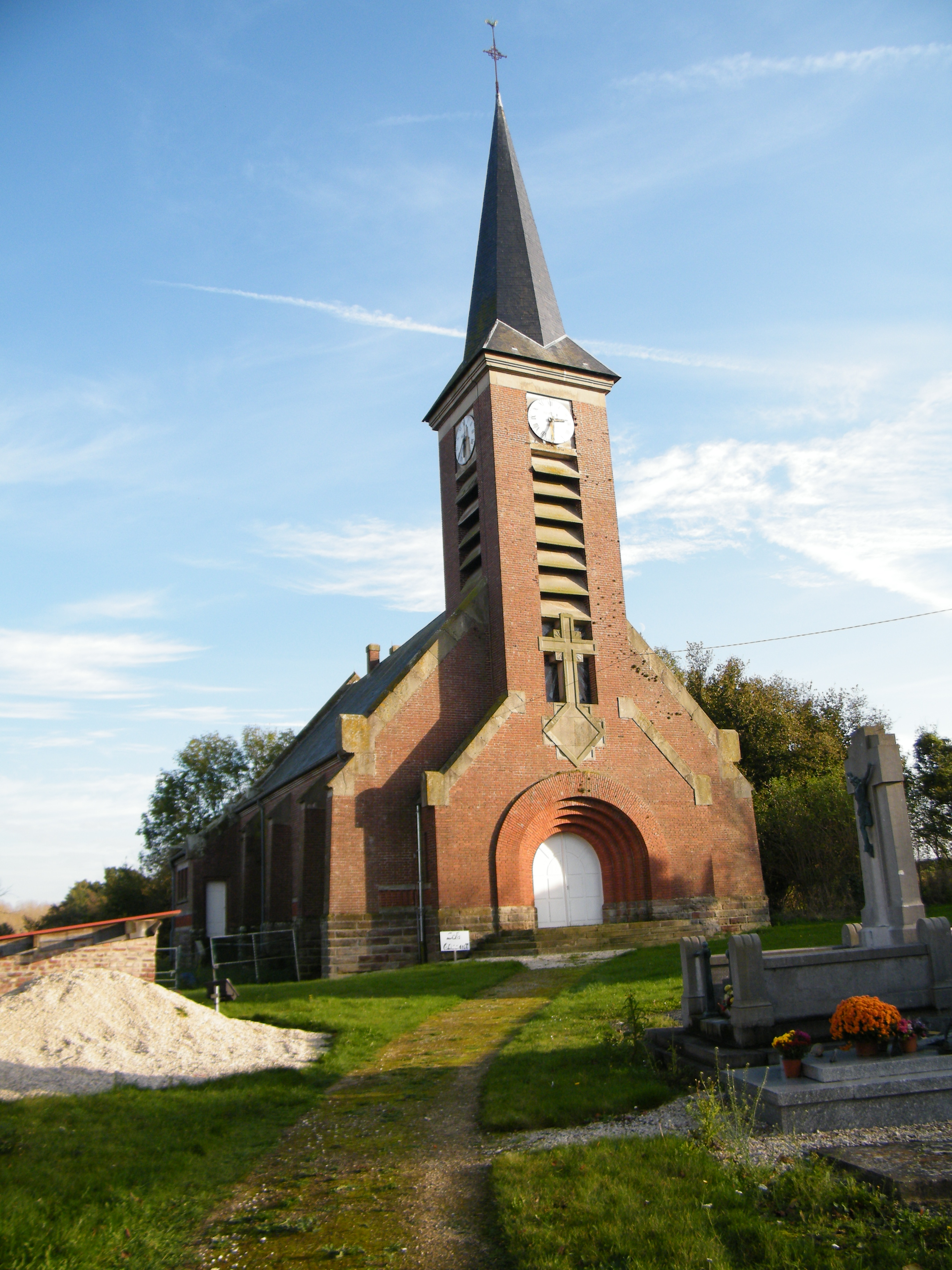
St Peter church

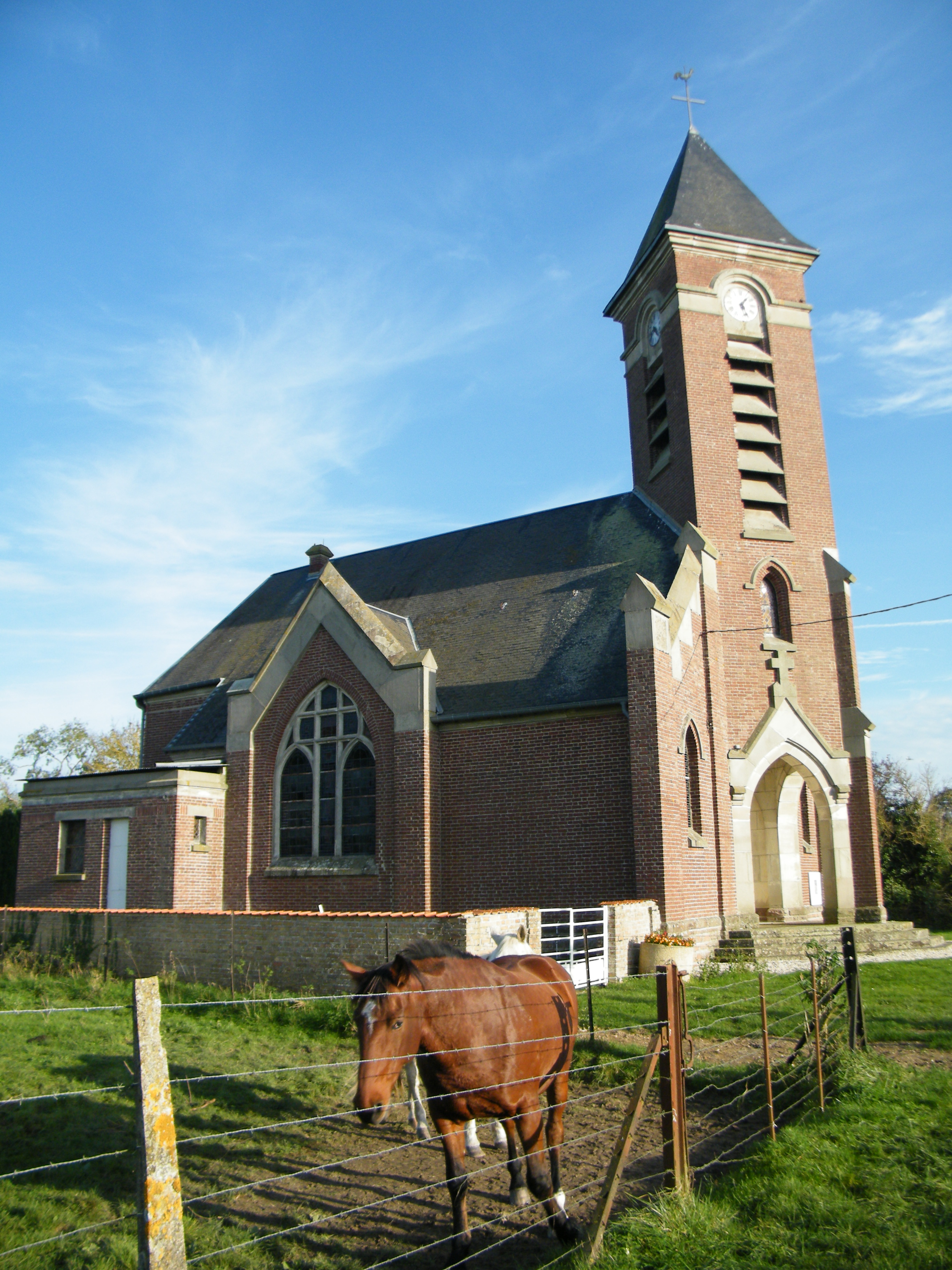
St Aurin church

== See also ==
- Communes of the Somme department
