= Damery, Somme =

Damery
- Commune
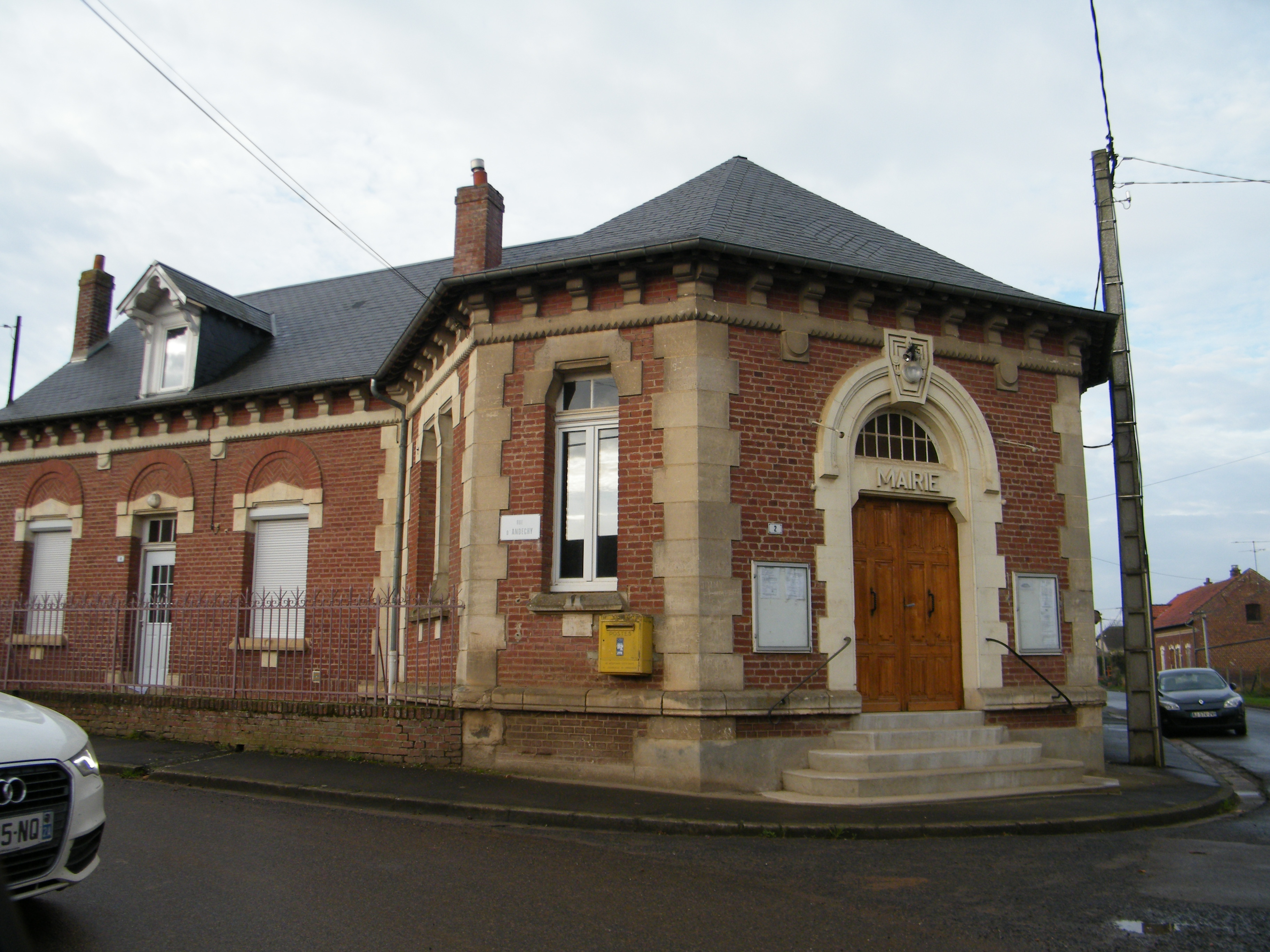
- The town hall in Damery
- Location of Damery
- Location within France Location within Hauts-de-France
- Coordinates: 49°43′56″N 2°44′37″E
- Country: France
- Region: Hauts-de-France
- Department: Somme
- Arrondissement: Montdidier
- Canton: Roye
- Intercommunality: CC Grand Roye

Government
  - Mayor (2020–2026): Jean-Pierre Destombes
- Area^{1}: 4.83 km^{2} (1.86 sq mi)
- Elevation: 110 m (360 ft)
- Highest elevation: 101 m (331 ft)
- Lowest elevation: 88 m (289 ft)
- Population (2023): 215
  - Density: 44.5/km^{2} (115/sq mi)
- Time zone: UTC+01:00 (CET)
  - Summer (DST): UTC+02:00 (CEST)
- INSEE/Postal code: 80232 /80700
- ^{1} French Land Register data, which excludes lakes, ponds, glaciers > 1 km^{2} (0.386 sq mi or 247 acres) and river estuaries.

Damery (French pronunciation: [damʁi]; Picard: Dambry) is a commune in the Somme department in Hauts-de-France in northern France.

== Geography ==
Damery is situated on the D139 road, some 5 miles (8 km) northwest of Roye.

== Population ==
Historical population
Year	Pop.	±% p.a.
1968	218	—
1975	176	−3.01%
1982	184	+0.64%
1990	178	−0.41%
1999	179	+0.06%
2007	210	+2.02%
2012	226	+1.48%
2017	235	+0.78%
2023	215	−1.47%
Source: INSEE

== See also ==
- Communes of the Somme department
