= Herly, Somme =

Herly
- Commune
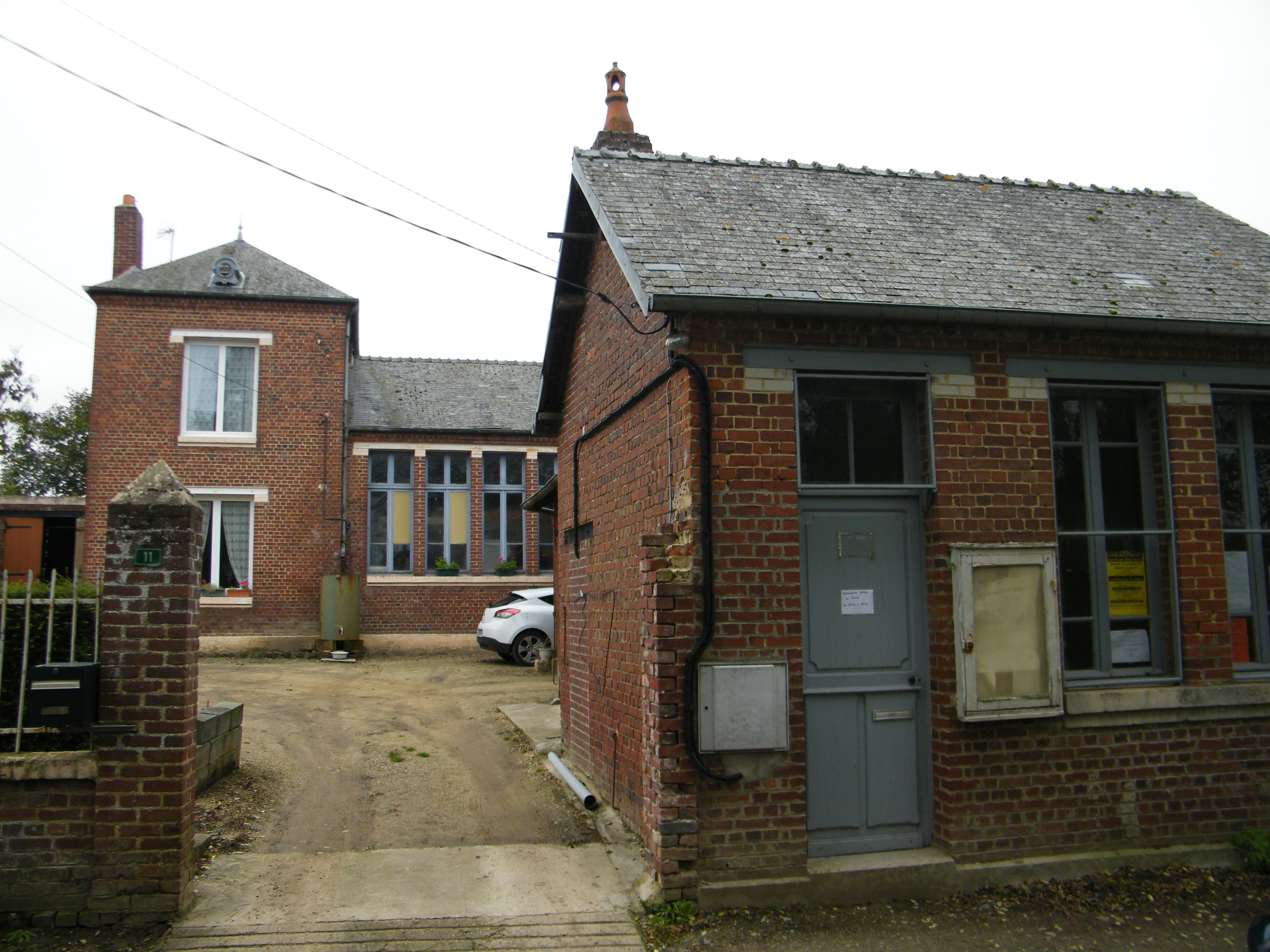
- The town hall and school in Herly
- Location of Herly
- Location within France Location within Hauts-de-France
- Coordinates: 49°45′24″N 2°52′27″E
- Country: France
- Region: Hauts-de-France
- Department: Somme
- Arrondissement: Montdidier
- Canton: Roye
- Intercommunality: CC Grand Roye

Government
  - Mayor (2020–2026): Nathalie Fouassier
- Area^{1}: 3.75 km^{2} (1.45 sq mi)
- Elevation: 72 m (236 ft)
- Highest elevation: 87 m (285 ft)
- Lowest elevation: 62 m (203 ft)
- Population (2023): 38
  - Density: 10/km^{2} (26/sq mi)
- Time zone: UTC+01:00 (CET)
  - Summer (DST): UTC+02:00 (CEST)
- INSEE/Postal code: 80433 /80190
- ^{1} French Land Register data, which excludes lakes, ponds, glaciers > 1 km^{2} (0.386 sq mi or 247 acres) and river estuaries.

Herly (French pronunciation: [ɛʁli]) is a commune in the Somme department in Hauts-de-France in northern France.

== Geography ==
Herly is situated at the D228 and D249 junction, some 30 miles (48 km) southeast of Amiens.

== Population ==
Historical population
| Year | Pop. | ±% p.a. |
|---|---|---|
| 1968 | 63 | — |
| 1975 | 51 | −2.97% |
| 1982 | 44 | −2.09% |
| 1990 | 45 | +0.28% |
| 1999 | 48 | +0.72% |
| 2007 | 47 | −0.26% |
| 2012 | 48 | +0.42% |
| 2017 | 45 | −1.28% |
| 2023 | 38 | −2.78% |
Source: INSEE

== See also ==
- Communes of the Somme department
