= Gruny, Somme =

Gruny
- Commune
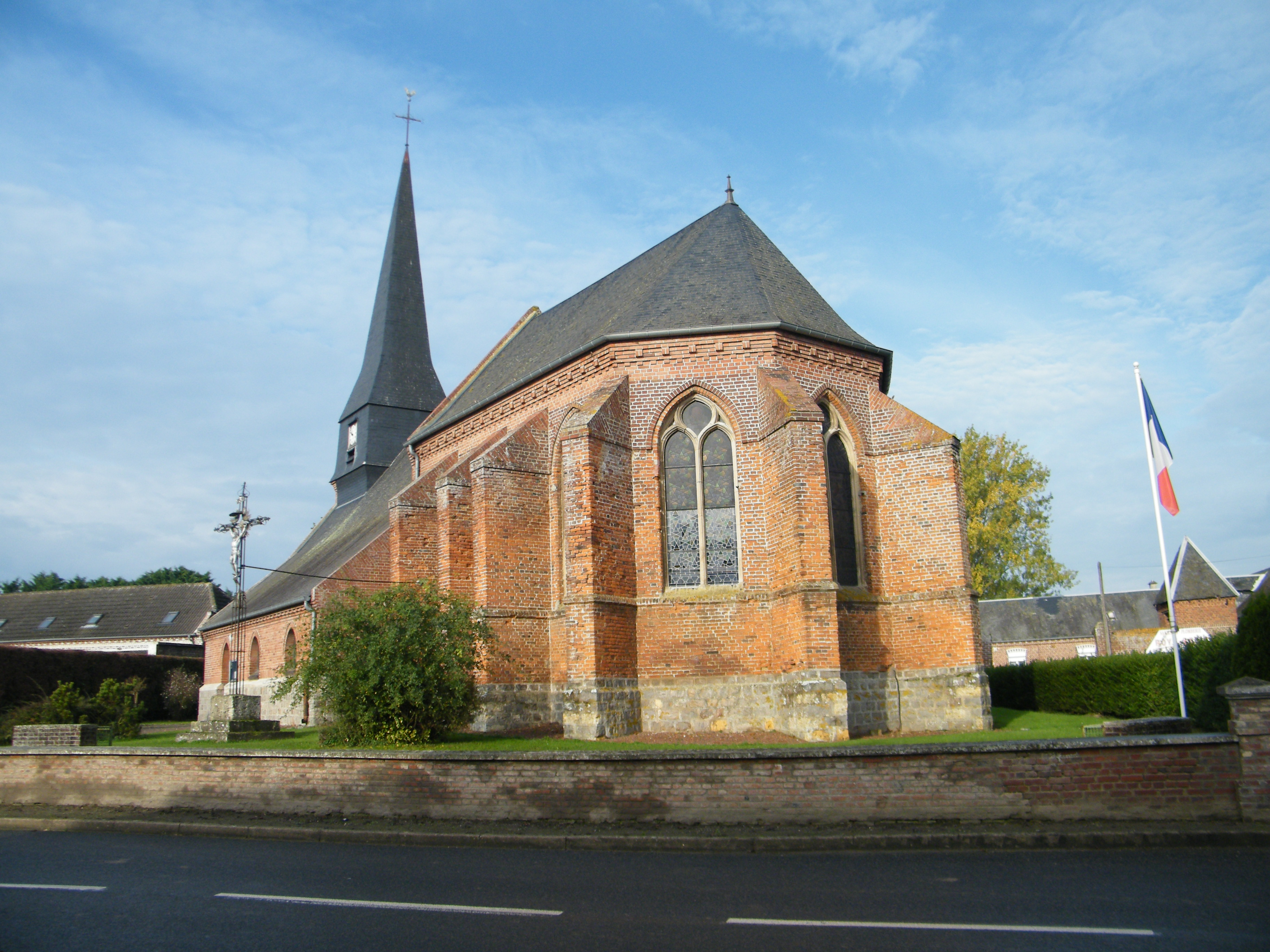
- The church in Gruny
- Location of Gruny
- Location within France Location within Hauts-de-France
- Coordinates: 49°43′47″N 2°49′18″E
- Country: France
- Region: Hauts-de-France
- Department: Somme
- Arrondissement: Montdidier
- Canton: Roye
- Intercommunality: CC Grand Roye

Government
  - Mayor (2020–2026): Éric Rigaux
- Area^{1}: 7.01 km^{2} (2.71 sq mi)
- Elevation: 94 m (308 ft)
- Highest elevation: 97 m (318 ft)
- Lowest elevation: 84 m (276 ft)
- Population (2023): 303
  - Density: 43.2/km^{2} (112/sq mi)
- Time zone: UTC+01:00 (CET)
  - Summer (DST): UTC+02:00 (CEST)
- INSEE/Postal code: 80393 /80700
- ^{1} French Land Register data, which excludes lakes, ponds, glaciers > 1 km^{2} (0.386 sq mi or 247 acres) and river estuaries.

Gruny (French pronunciation: [ɡʁyni]) is a commune in the Somme department in Hauts-de-France in northern France.

== Geography ==
Gruny lies in the southeast of the département, just off the N17 road, on the D232, some 30 miles (48 km) southeast of Amiens.

== Population ==
Historical population
Year	Pop.	±% p.a.
1968	206	—
1975	220	+0.94%
1982	228	+0.51%
1990	271	+2.18%
1999	300	+1.14%
2007	315	+0.61%
2012	335	+1.24%
2017	324	−0.67%
2023	303	−1.11%
Source: INSEE

== See also ==
- Communes of the Somme department
