= Villers-lès-Roye =

- Commune
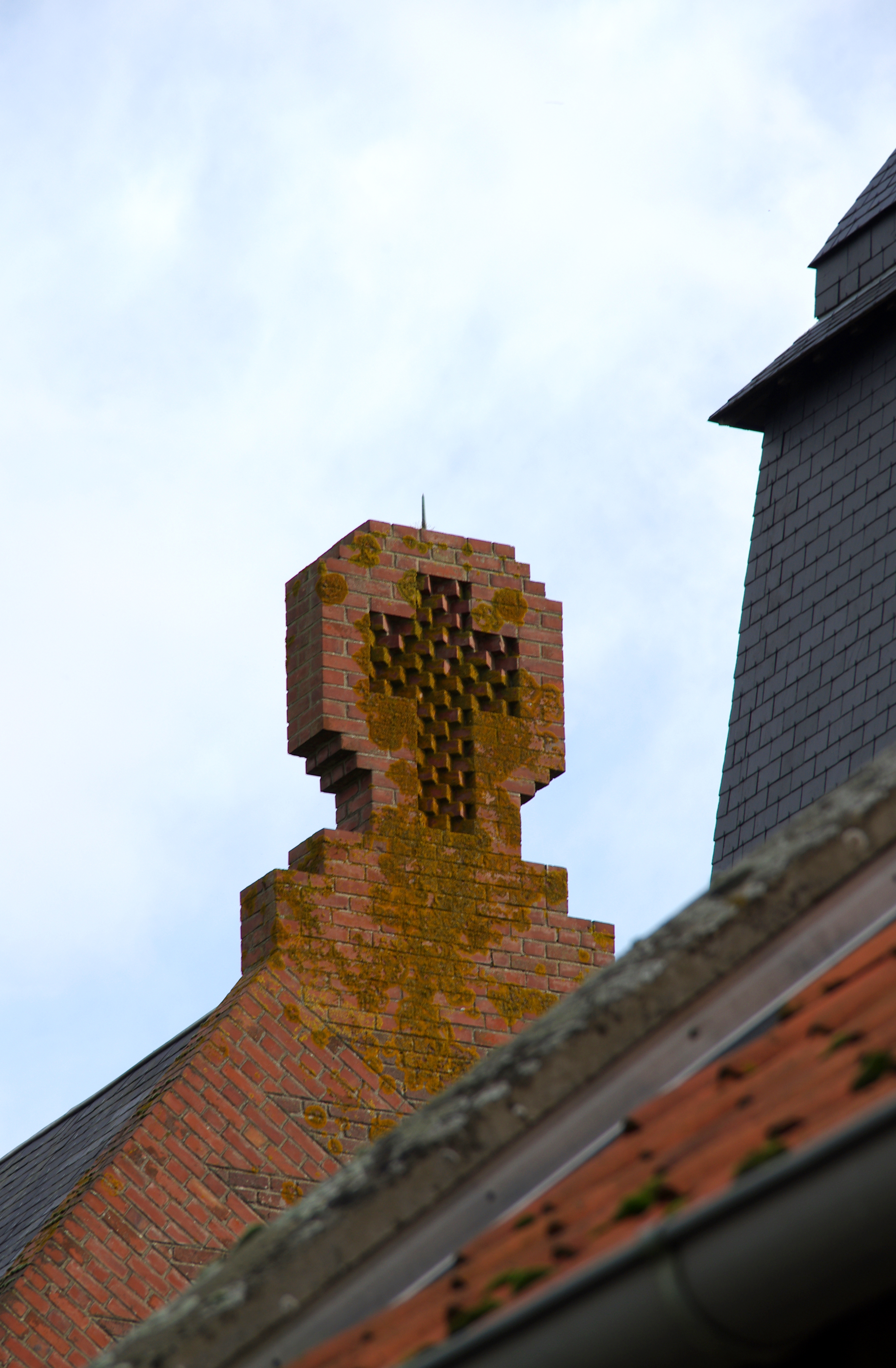
- A cross on the church in Villers-lès-Roye
- Location of Villers-lès-Roye
- Location within France Location within Hauts-de-France
- Coordinates: 49°42′24″N 2°43′59″E
- Country: France
- Region: Hauts-de-France
- Department: Somme
- Arrondissement: Montdidier
- Canton: Roye
- Intercommunality: CC Grand Roye

Government
  - Mayor (2020–2026): Bruno Caron
- Area^{1}: 6.31 km^{2} (2.44 sq mi)
- Elevation: 87 m (285 ft)
- Highest elevation: 99 m (325 ft)
- Lowest elevation: 62 m (203 ft)
- Population (2023): 288
  - Density: 45.6/km^{2} (118/sq mi)
- Time zone: UTC+01:00 (CET)
  - Summer (DST): UTC+02:00 (CEST)
- INSEE/Postal code: 80803 /80700
- ^{1} French Land Register data, which excludes lakes, ponds, glaciers > 1 km^{2} (0.386 sq mi or 247 acres) and river estuaries.

Villers-lès-Roye (French pronunciation: [vilɛʁ lɛ ʁwa], literally Villers near Roye) is a commune in the Somme department in Hauts-de-France in northern France.

== Geography ==
The commune is situated 25 miles(40 km) southeast of Amiens, on the D54 road.

== Population ==
Historical population
Year	Pop.	±% p.a.
1968	162	—
1975	128	−3.31%
1982	183	+5.24%
1990	187	+0.27%
1999	203	+0.92%
2007	221	+1.07%
2012	252	+2.66%
2017	274	+1.69%
2023	288	+0.83%
Source: INSEE

== See also ==
- Communes of the Somme department
