= Champien =

- Commune
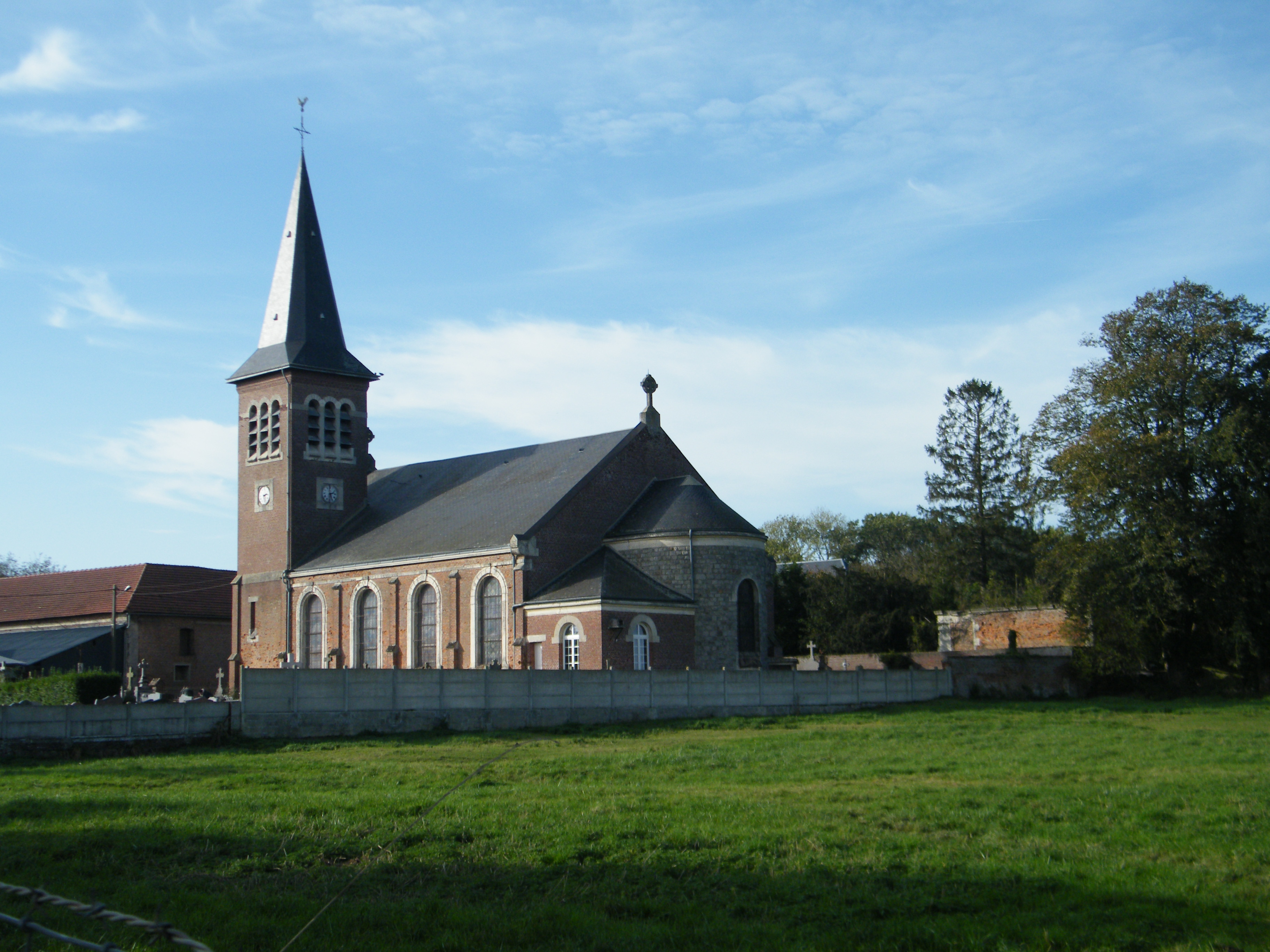
- The church in Champien
- Location of Champien
- Location within France Location within Hauts-de-France
- Coordinates: 49°41′43″N 2°51′39″E
- Country: France
- Region: Hauts-de-France
- Department: Somme
- Arrondissement: Montdidier
- Canton: Roye
- Intercommunality: CC Grand Roye

Government
  - Mayor (2020–2026): Thierry Guerle
- Area^{1}: 8.77 km^{2} (3.39 sq mi)
- Elevation: 95 m (312 ft)
- Highest elevation: 99 m (325 ft)
- Lowest elevation: 82 m (269 ft)
- Population (2023): 272
  - Density: 31.0/km^{2} (80.3/sq mi)
- Time zone: UTC+01:00 (CET)
  - Summer (DST): UTC+02:00 (CEST)
- INSEE/Postal code: 80185 /80700
- ^{1} French Land Register data, which excludes lakes, ponds, glaciers > 1 km^{2} (0.386 sq mi or 247 acres) and river estuaries.

Champien (French pronunciation: [ʃɑ̃pjɛ̃]; Picard: Chimpien) is a commune in the Somme department in Hauts-de-France in northern France.

== Geography ==
Champien is situated on the D186 road, some 30 miles (48 km) southeast of Amiens.

== Population ==
Historical population
| Year | Pop. | ±% p.a. |
|---|---|---|
| 1968 | 226 | — |
| 1975 | 231 | +0.31% |
| 1982 | 176 | −3.81% |
| 1990 | 251 | +4.54% |
| 1999 | 249 | −0.09% |
| 2007 | 291 | +1.97% |
| 2012 | 280 | −0.77% |
| 2017 | 276 | −0.29% |
| 2023 | 272 | −0.24% |
Source: INSEE

== See also ==
- Communes of the Somme department
- Réseau des Bains de Mer
