= Fresnoy-lès-Roye =

- Commune
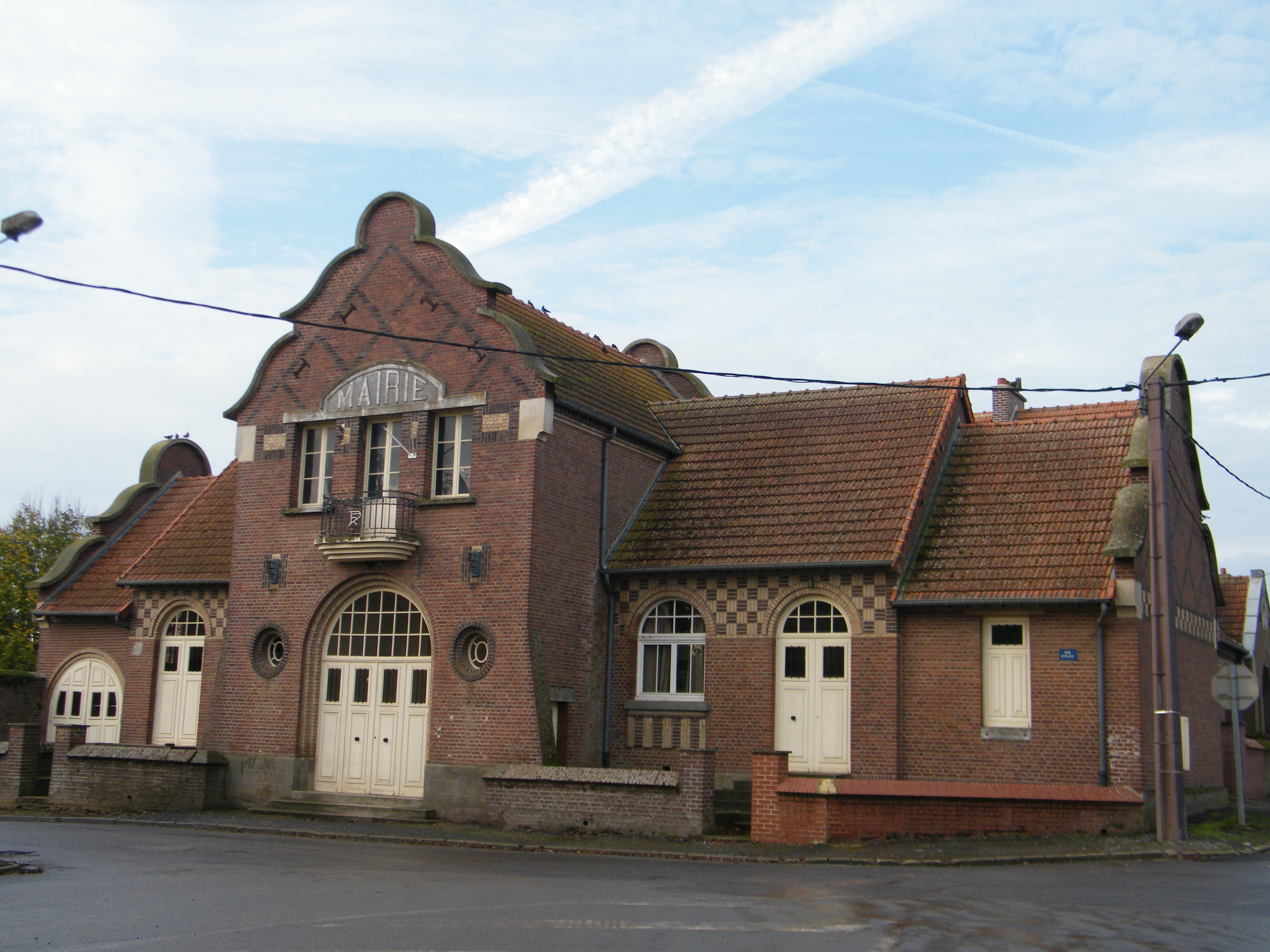
- The town hall in Fresnoy-lès-Roye
- Location of Fresnoy-lès-Roye
- Location within France Location within Hauts-de-France
- Coordinates: 49°44′16″N 2°46′34″E
- Country: France
- Region: Hauts-de-France
- Department: Somme
- Arrondissement: Montdidier
- Canton: Roye
- Intercommunality: CC Grand Roye

Government
  - Mayor (2020–2026): Cyrille Cleuet
- Area^{1}: 7.65 km^{2} (2.95 sq mi)
- Elevation: 91 m (299 ft)
- Highest elevation: 96 m (315 ft)
- Lowest elevation: 84 m (276 ft)
- Population (2023): 286
  - Density: 37.4/km^{2} (96.8/sq mi)
- Time zone: UTC+01:00 (CET)
  - Summer (DST): UTC+02:00 (CEST)
- INSEE/Postal code: 80359 /80700
- ^{1} French Land Register data, which excludes lakes, ponds, glaciers > 1 km^{2} (0.386 sq mi or 247 acres) and river estuaries.

Fresnoy-lès-Roye (French pronunciation: [fʁɛnwa lɛ ʁwa], literally Fresnoy near Roye) is a commune in the Somme department in Hauts-de-France in northern France.

== Geography ==
The commune is situated 25 miles (40 km) southeast of Amiens on the D132 and D139 junction, next to the A1 autoroute.

== Population ==
Historical population
Year	Pop.	±% p.a.
1968	275	—
1975	259	−0.85%
1982	278	+1.02%
1990	269	−0.41%
1999	266	−0.12%
2007	311	+1.97%
2012	297	−0.92%
2017	293	−0.27%
2023	286	−0.40%
Source: INSEE

== See also ==
- Communes of the Somme department
