= Boussicourt =

- Commune
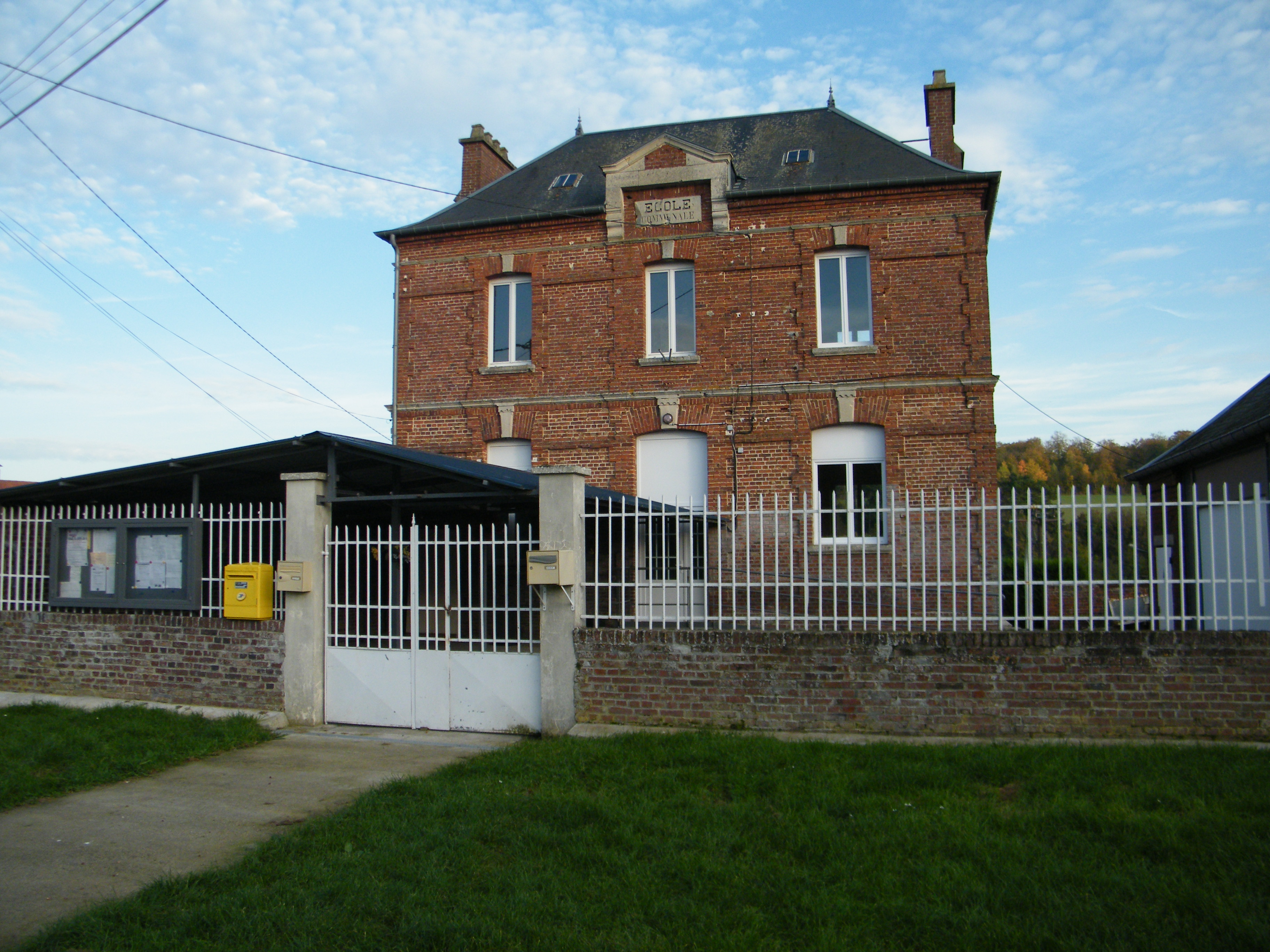
- The town hall and school in Boussicourt
- Location of Boussicourt
- Location within France Location within Hauts-de-France
- Coordinates: 49°42′16″N 2°34′37″E
- Country: France
- Region: Hauts-de-France
- Department: Somme
- Arrondissement: Montdidier
- Canton: Roye
- Intercommunality: CC Grand Roye

Government
  - Mayor (2020–2026): Jean-François Pellé-Lefebvre
- Area^{1}: 3.32 km^{2} (1.28 sq mi)
- Elevation: 90 m (300 ft)
- Highest elevation: 108 m (354 ft)
- Lowest elevation: 44 m (144 ft)
- Population (2023): 80
  - Density: 24/km^{2} (62/sq mi)
- Time zone: UTC+01:00 (CET)
  - Summer (DST): UTC+02:00 (CEST)
- INSEE/Postal code: 80125 /80500
- ^{1} French Land Register data, which excludes lakes, ponds, glaciers > 1 km^{2} (0.386 sq mi or 247 acres) and river estuaries.

Boussicourt (French pronunciation: [busikuʁ]; Picard: Bouchicourt) is a commune in the Somme department in Hauts-de-France in northern France.

== Geography ==
Boussicourt is situated on the D250 road, by the banks of the river Avre, some 20 miles (32 km) southeast of Amiens.

== Population ==
Historical population
| Year | Pop. | ±% p.a. |
|---|---|---|
| 1968 | 54 | — |
| 1975 | 52 | −0.54% |
| 1982 | 57 | +1.32% |
| 1990 | 54 | −0.67% |
| 1999 | 53 | −0.21% |
| 2007 | 72 | +3.90% |
| 2012 | 82 | +2.64% |
| 2017 | 87 | +1.19% |
| 2023 | 80 | −1.39% |
Source: INSEE

== See also ==
- Communes of the Somme department
