= Gratibus =

- Commune
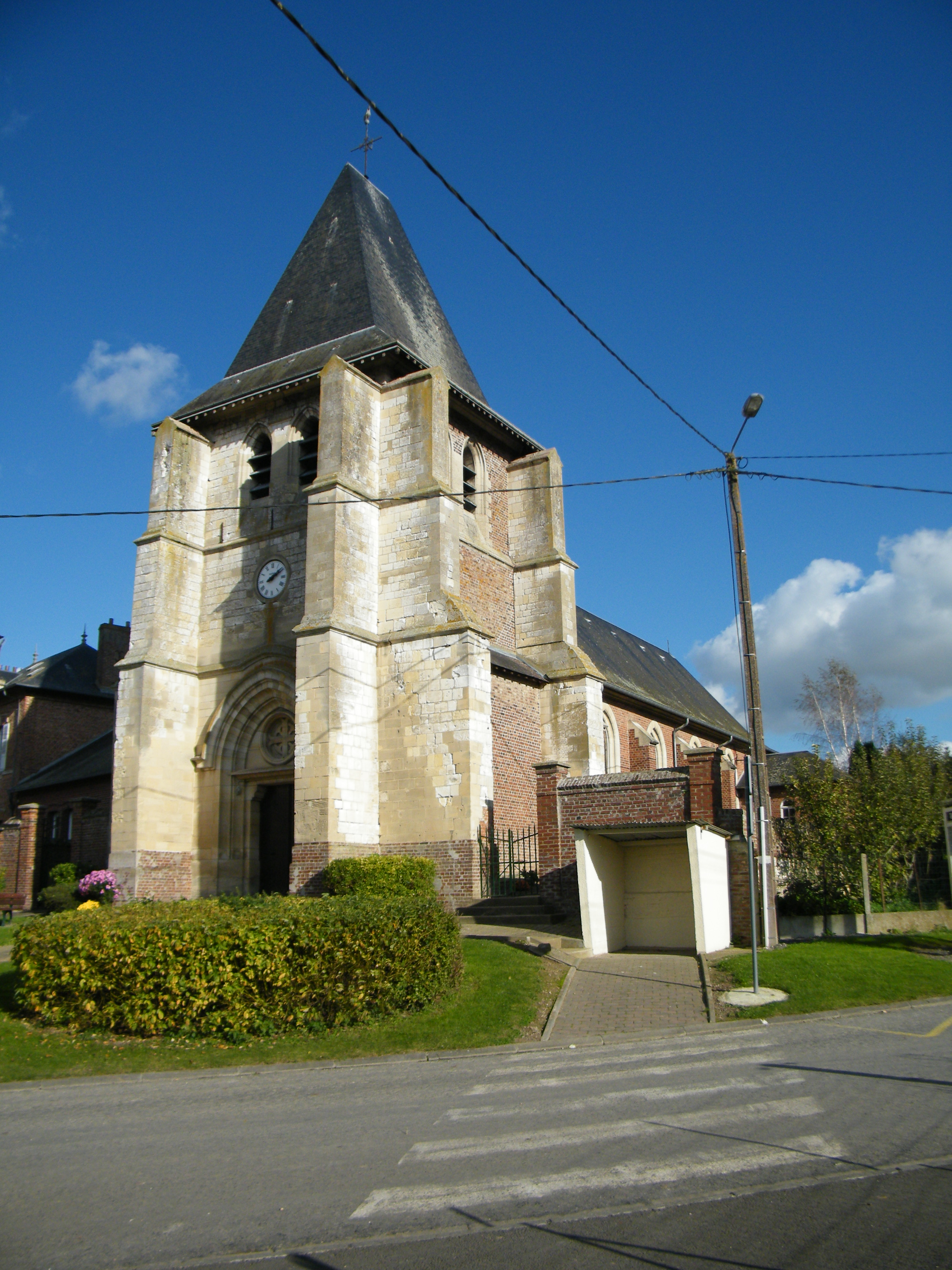
- The church in Gratibus
- Location of Gratibus
- Location within France Location within Hauts-de-France
- Coordinates: 49°41′16″N 2°32′26″E
- Country: France
- Region: Hauts-de-France
- Department: Somme
- Arrondissement: Montdidier
- Canton: Roye
- Intercommunality: CC Grand Roye

Government
  - Mayor (2020–2026): Hubert Dehaspe
- Area^{1}: 5.33 km^{2} (2.06 sq mi)
- Elevation: 100 m (330 ft)
- Highest elevation: 111 m (364 ft)
- Lowest elevation: 46 m (151 ft)
- Population (2023): 175
  - Density: 32.8/km^{2} (85.0/sq mi)
- Time zone: UTC+01:00 (CET)
  - Summer (DST): UTC+02:00 (CEST)
- INSEE/Postal code: 80386 /80500
- ^{1} French Land Register data, which excludes lakes, ponds, glaciers > 1 km^{2} (0.386 sq mi or 247 acres) and river estuaries.

Gratibus is a commune in the Somme department in Hauts-de-France in northern France.

== Geography ==
Gratibus is situated on the D240 road, some 25 miles (40 km) southeast of Amiens, by the banks of the river Noye.

== Population ==
Historical population
Year	Pop.	±% p.a.
1968	122	—
1975	101	−2.66%
1982	135	+4.23%
1990	148	+1.16%
1999	172	+1.68%
2007	166	−0.44%
2012	175	+1.06%
2017	182	+0.79%
2023	175	−0.65%
Source: INSEE

== See also ==
- Communes of the Somme department
