= Assainvillers =

- Commune
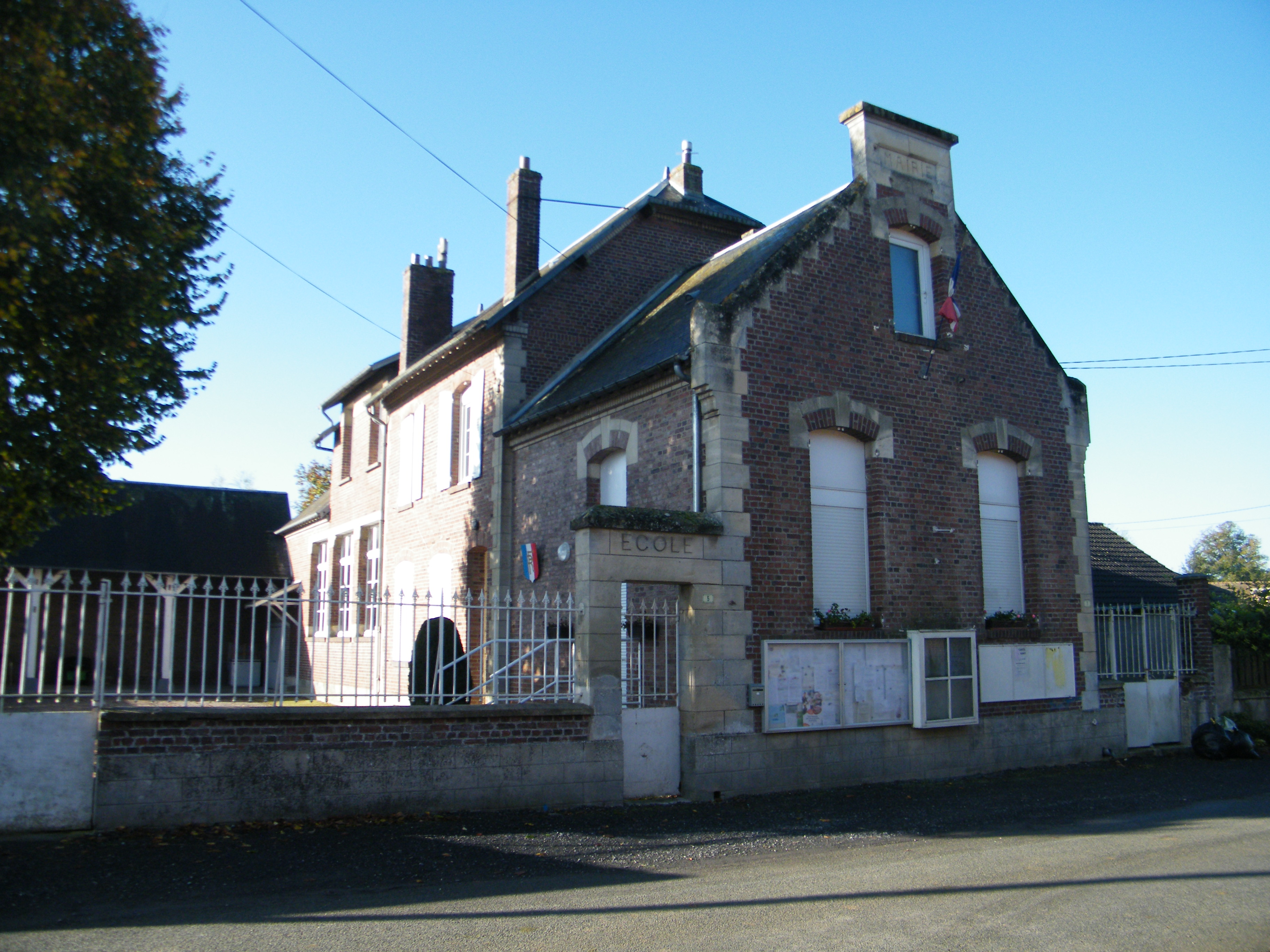
- The town hall and school in Assainvillers
- Location of Assainvillers
- Location within France Location within Hauts-de-France
- Coordinates: 49°37′15″N 2°36′37″E
- Country: France
- Region: Hauts-de-France
- Department: Somme
- Arrondissement: Montdidier
- Canton: Roye
- Intercommunality: CC Grand Roye

Government
  - Mayor (2020–2026): Xavier Dejaiffe
- Area^{1}: 7.3 km^{2} (2.8 sq mi)
- Elevation: 85 m (279 ft)
- Highest elevation: 100 m (330 ft)
- Lowest elevation: 68 m (223 ft)
- Population (2023): 136
  - Density: 19/km^{2} (48/sq mi)
- Time zone: UTC+01:00 (CET)
  - Summer (DST): UTC+02:00 (CEST)
- INSEE/Postal code: 80032 /80500
- ^{1} French Land Register data, which excludes lakes, ponds, glaciers > 1 km^{2} (0.386 sq mi or 247 acres) and river estuaries.

Assainvillers is a commune in the Somme department in Hauts-de-France in northern France.

== See also ==
- Communes of the Somme department
