= Rollot =

- Commune
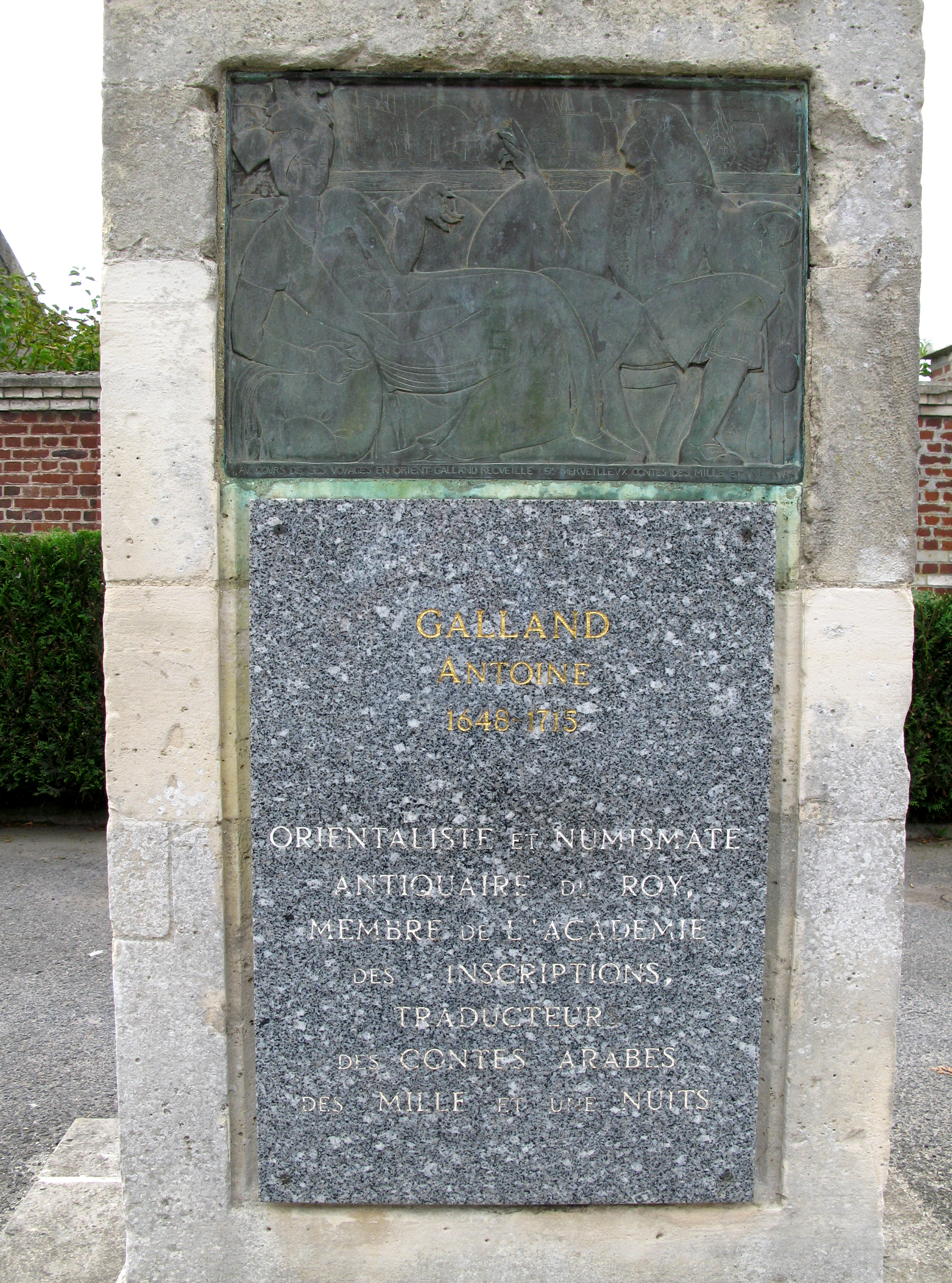
- Monument to Antoine Galland

- Coat of arms
- Location of Rollot
- Location within France Location within Hauts-de-France
- Coordinates: 49°35′23″N 2°39′16″E
- Country: France
- Region: Hauts-de-France
- Department: Somme
- Arrondissement: Montdidier
- Canton: Roye
- Intercommunality: CC Grand Roye

Government
  - Mayor (2020–2026): Michel Choisy
- Area^{1}: 12.00 km^{2} (4.63 sq mi)
- Elevation: 100 m (330 ft)
- Highest elevation: 126 m (413 ft)
- Lowest elevation: 82 m (269 ft)
- Population (2023): 755
  - Density: 62.9/km^{2} (163/sq mi)
- Time zone: UTC+01:00 (CET)
  - Summer (DST): UTC+02:00 (CEST)
- INSEE/Postal code: 80678 /80500
- ^{1} French Land Register data, which excludes lakes, ponds, glaciers > 1 km^{2} (0.386 sq mi or 247 acres) and river estuaries.

Rollot (French pronunciation: [ʁɔlo]) is a commune in the Somme department in Hauts-de-France in northern France.

== Geography ==
Rollot is situated 25 miles (40 km) southeast of Amiens, on the D 935 road. It is the most southerly commune in the département, just a few hundred yards from the département of Oise.

== History ==
Rollot is well known throughout France, thanks in part to the locally made cheese of the same name, since the 18th century.

== Population ==
Historical population

Year	Pop.	±% p.a.
1926	626	—
1931	515	−3.83%
1936	607	+3.34%
1946	648	+0.66%
1954	590	−1.17%
1962	584	−0.13%
1968	607	+0.65%
1975	561	−1.12%

Year	Pop.	±% p.a.
1982	540	−0.54%
1990	575	+0.79%
1999	631	+1.04%
2007	701	+1.32%
2012	772	+1.95%
2017	751	−0.55%
2023	755	+0.09%

Source: EHESS and INSEE

== Places of interest ==
- Saint Nicolas' church
- Saint Germain's church
- Statue of Antoine Galland
- Feudal motte with a 12th-century cave (private property)
- War memorial

== Personalities ==
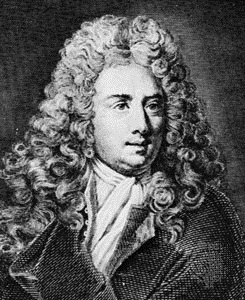
Antoine Galland

- Antoine Galland, born in 1646 at Rollot. Famous orientalist and archaeologist, best remembered as the first European translator of The Thousand and One Nights.

== See also ==
- Communes of the Somme department
