= Mesnil-Saint-Georges =

- Commune
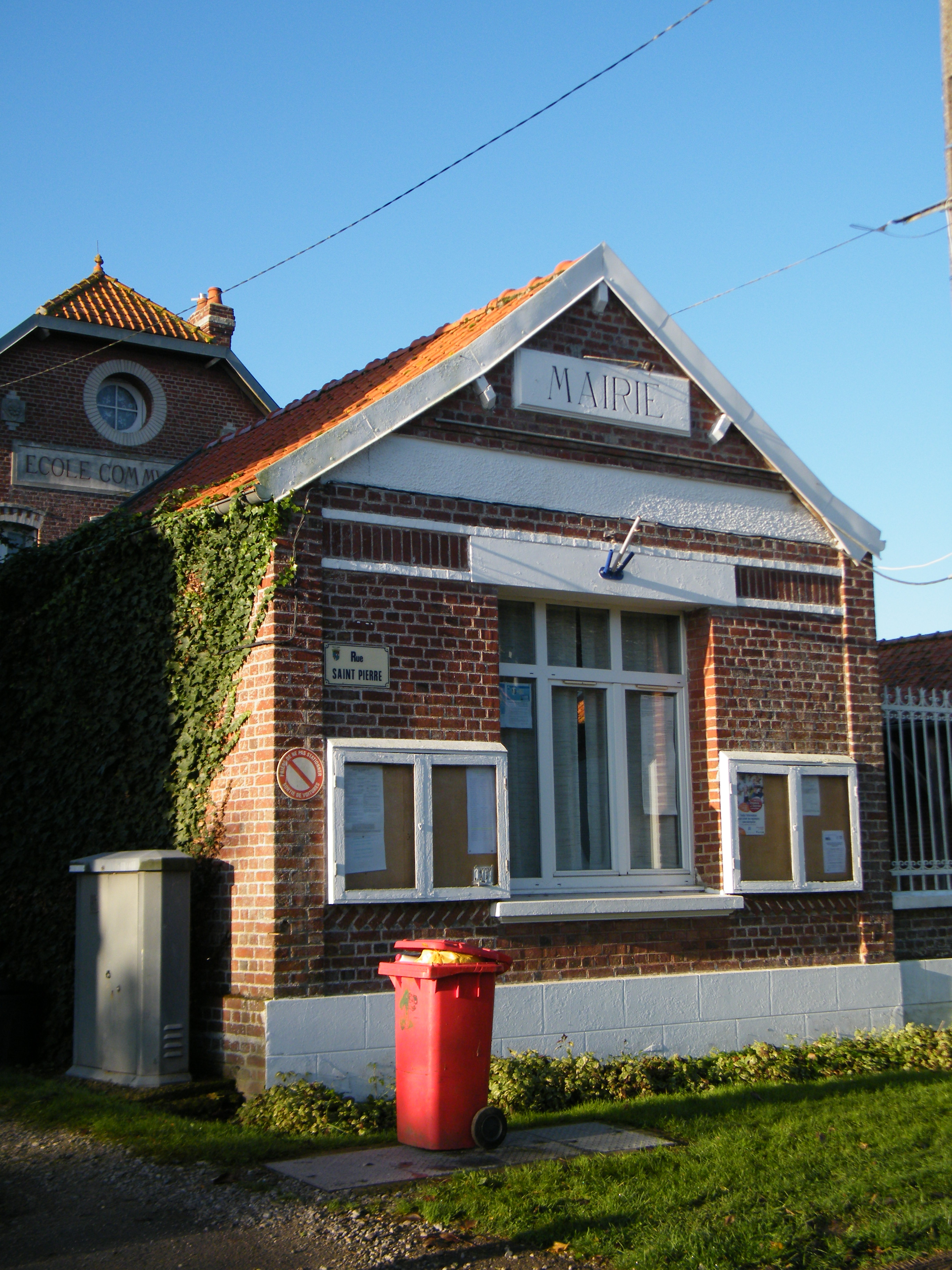
- The town hall in Mesnil-Saint-Georges
- Location of Mesnil-Saint-Georges
- Location within France Location within Hauts-de-France
- Coordinates: 49°38′23″N 2°31′30″E
- Country: France
- Region: Hauts-de-France
- Department: Somme
- Arrondissement: Montdidier
- Canton: Roye
- Intercommunality: CC Grand Roye

Government
  - Mayor (2020–2026): Gaël Bonnard
- Area^{1}: 6.04 km^{2} (2.33 sq mi)
- Elevation: 93 m (305 ft)
- Highest elevation: 102 m (335 ft)
- Lowest elevation: 63 m (207 ft)
- Population (2023): 217
  - Density: 35.9/km^{2} (93.1/sq mi)
- Time zone: UTC+01:00 (CET)
  - Summer (DST): UTC+02:00 (CEST)
- INSEE/Postal code: 80541 /80500
- ^{1} French Land Register data, which excludes lakes, ponds, glaciers > 1 km^{2} (0.386 sq mi or 247 acres) and river estuaries.

Mesnil-Saint-Georges (French pronunciation: [mɛnil sɛ̃ ʒɔʁʒ]; Picard: Mini-Saint-Georges) is a commune in the Somme department in Hauts-de-France in northern France.

== Geography ==
The commune is situated on the D930 road, some 15 miles (24 km) southeast of Amiens, close to the border with the departement of the Oise. Since the Second World War, the church and school have stood empty.

== Population ==
Historical population
Year	Pop.	±% p.a.
1968	133	—
1975	144	+1.14%
1982	120	−2.57%
1990	137	+1.67%
1999	147	+0.79%
2007	177	+2.35%
2012	177	+0.00%
2017	188	+1.21%
2023	217	+2.42%
Source: INSEE

== See also ==
- Communes of the Somme department
