= Marestmontiers =

- Commune
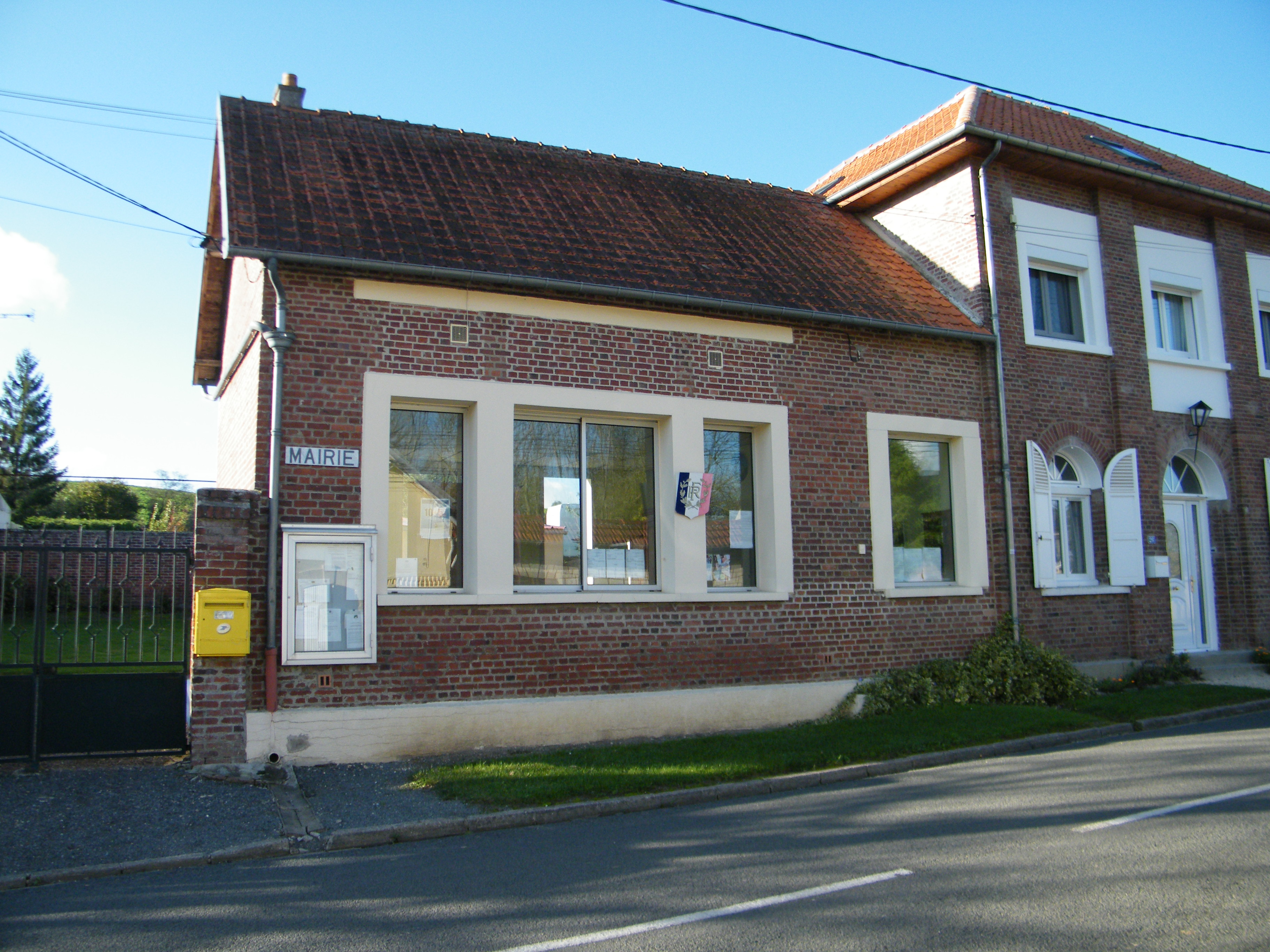
- The town hall in Marestmontiers
- Location of Marestmontiers
- Location within France Location within Hauts-de-France
- Coordinates: 49°41′14″N 2°31′51″E
- Country: France
- Region: Hauts-de-France
- Department: Somme
- Arrondissement: Montdidier
- Canton: Roye
- Intercommunality: CC Grand Roye

Government
  - Mayor (2020–2026): Serge Morand
- Area^{1}: 2.48 km^{2} (0.96 sq mi)
- Elevation: 50 m (160 ft)
- Highest elevation: 107 m (351 ft)
- Lowest elevation: 45 m (148 ft)
- Population (2023): 120
  - Density: 48/km^{2} (130/sq mi)
- Time zone: UTC+01:00 (CET)
  - Summer (DST): UTC+02:00 (CEST)
- INSEE/Postal code: 80511 /80500
- ^{1} French Land Register data, which excludes lakes, ponds, glaciers > 1 km^{2} (0.386 sq mi or 247 acres) and river estuaries.

Marestmontiers is a commune in the Somme department in Hauts-de-France in northern France.

== Geography ==
Marestmontiers is situated on the D155 road, by the banks of the Avre river, some 20 miles (32 km) south of Amiens.

== Population ==
Historical population
Year	Pop.	±% p.a.
1968	69	—
1975	42	−6.85%
1982	49	+2.23%
1990	59	+2.35%
1999	77	+3.00%
2007	97	+2.93%
2012	108	+2.17%
2017	113	+0.91%
2023	120	+1.01%
Source: INSEE

== See also ==
- Communes of the Somme department
