= Davenescourt =

- Commune
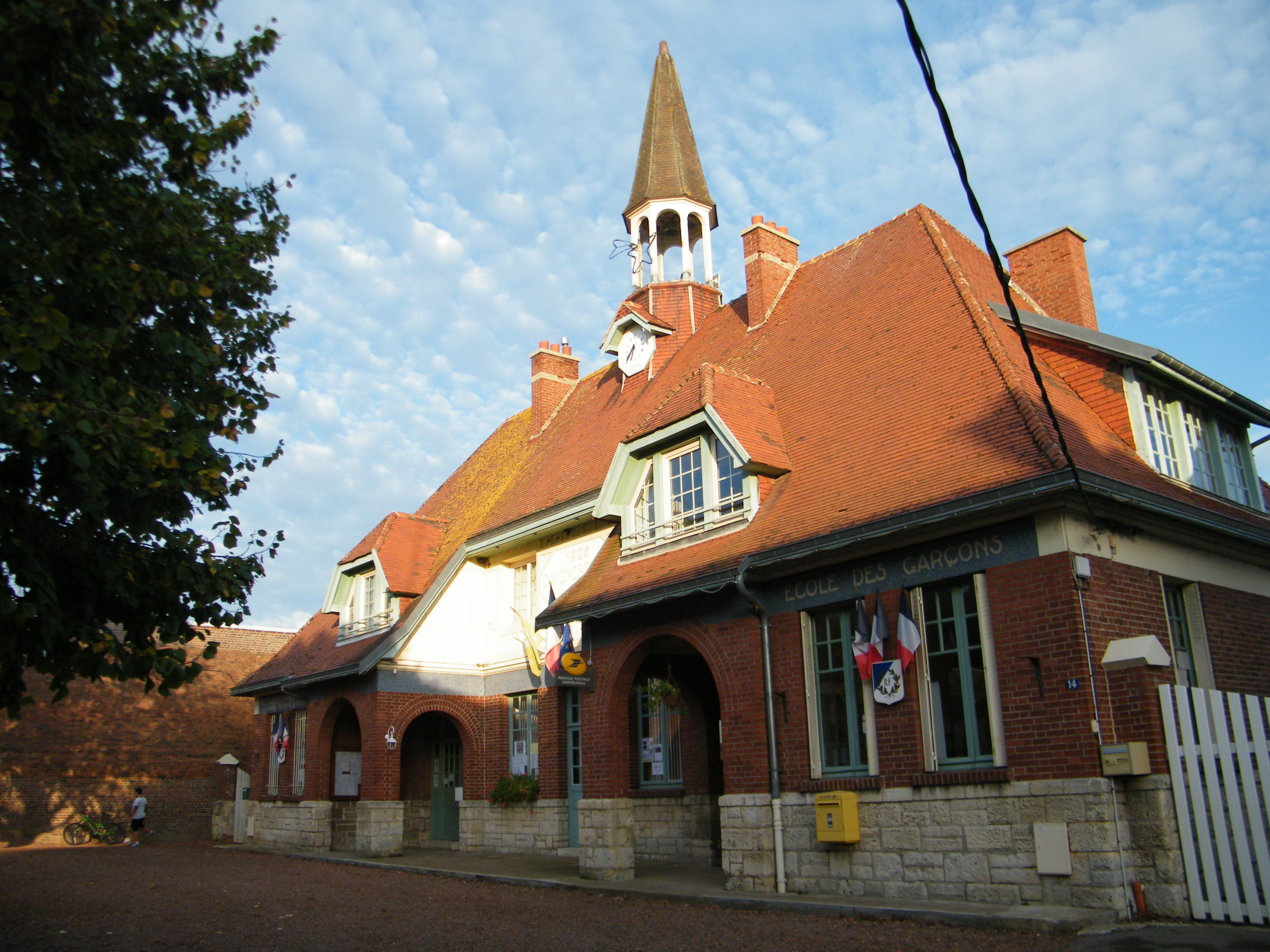
- The town hall and schools in Davenescourt
- Location of Davenescourt
- Location within France Location within Hauts-de-France
- Coordinates: 49°42′36″N 2°35′49″E
- Country: France
- Region: Hauts-de-France
- Department: Somme
- Arrondissement: Montdidier
- Canton: Roye
- Intercommunality: CC Grand Roye

Government
  - Mayor (2020–2026): Jean-Claude Pradeilhes
- Area^{1}: 11.73 km^{2} (4.53 sq mi)
- Elevation: 58 m (190 ft)
- Highest elevation: 114 m (374 ft)
- Lowest elevation: 44 m (144 ft)
- Population (2023): 555
  - Density: 47.3/km^{2} (123/sq mi)
- Time zone: UTC+01:00 (CET)
  - Summer (DST): UTC+02:00 (CEST)
- INSEE/Postal code: 80236 /80500
- ^{1} French Land Register data, which excludes lakes, ponds, glaciers > 1 km^{2} (0.386 sq mi or 247 acres) and river estuaries.

Davenescourt (French pronunciation: [davnɛskuʁ]; Picard: Davnécourt) is a commune in the Somme department in Hauts-de-France in northern France.

== Geography ==
Davenescourt is situated on the D160 and D41 road junction, on the banks of the Avre, surrounded by lakes, some 25 miles (40 km) southeast of Amiens.

== Population ==
Historical population
| Year | Pop. | ±% p.a. |
|---|---|---|
| 1968 | 415 | — |
| 1975 | 364 | −1.86% |
| 1982 | 334 | −1.22% |
| 1990 | 329 | −0.19% |
| 1999 | 469 | +4.02% |
| 2007 | 494 | +0.65% |
| 2012 | 533 | +1.53% |
| 2017 | 563 | +1.10% |
| 2023 | 555 | −0.24% |
Source: INSEE

== Places of interest ==
- Chateau of Davenescourt

== See also ==
- Communes of the Somme department
