= Faverolles, Somme =

Faverolles
- Commune
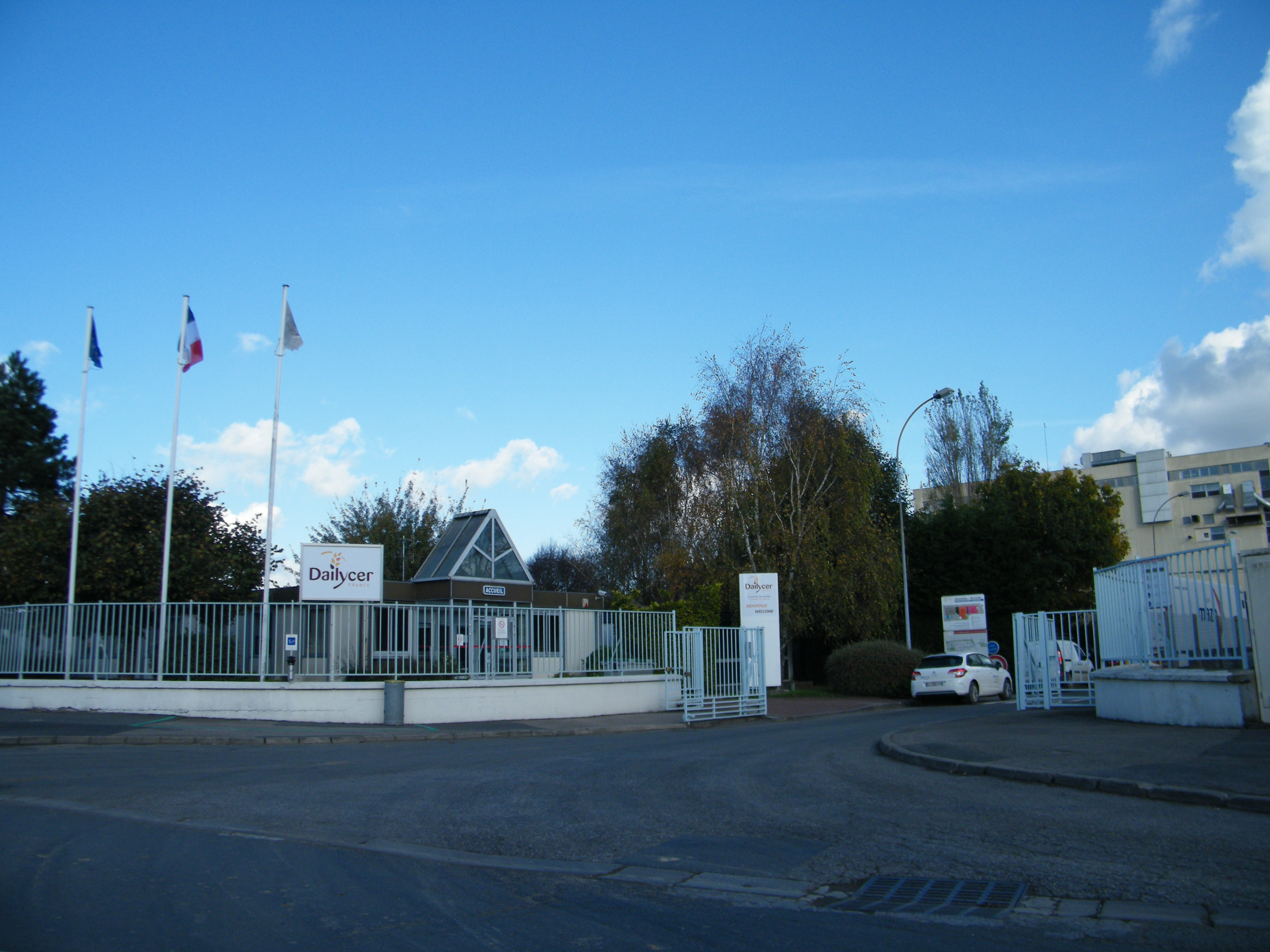
- Faverolles business park
- Location of Faverolles
- Location within France Location within Hauts-de-France
- Coordinates: 49°38′58″N 2°37′17″E
- Country: France
- Region: Hauts-de-France
- Department: Somme
- Arrondissement: Montdidier
- Canton: Roye
- Intercommunality: CC Grand Roye

Government
  - Mayor (2020–2026): Colette Carrier
- Area^{1}: 6.7 km^{2} (2.6 sq mi)
- Elevation: 105 m (344 ft)
- Highest elevation: 109 m (358 ft)
- Lowest elevation: 80 m (260 ft)
- Population (2023): 171
  - Density: 26/km^{2} (66/sq mi)
- Time zone: UTC+01:00 (CET)
  - Summer (DST): UTC+02:00 (CEST)
- INSEE/Postal code: 80302 /80500
- ^{1} French Land Register data, which excludes lakes, ponds, glaciers > 1 km^{2} (0.386 sq mi or 247 acres) and river estuaries.

Faverolles (French pronunciation: [favʁɔl]; Picard: Favrole ) is a commune in the Somme department in Hauts-de-France in northern France.

== Geography ==
Faverolles is on the D930 road, some 32 km (20 mi) southeast of Amiens.

== Places of interest ==
- Church of Saint Marie
- War memorial

== Population ==
Historical population
Year	Pop.	±% p.a.
1968	135	—
1975	133	−0.21%
1982	143	+1.04%
1990	150	+0.60%
1999	139	−0.84%
2007	158	+1.61%
2012	151	−0.90%
2017	161	+1.29%
2023	171	+1.01%
Source: INSEE

== See also ==
- Communes of the Somme department
