= Laboissière-en-Santerre =

- Commune
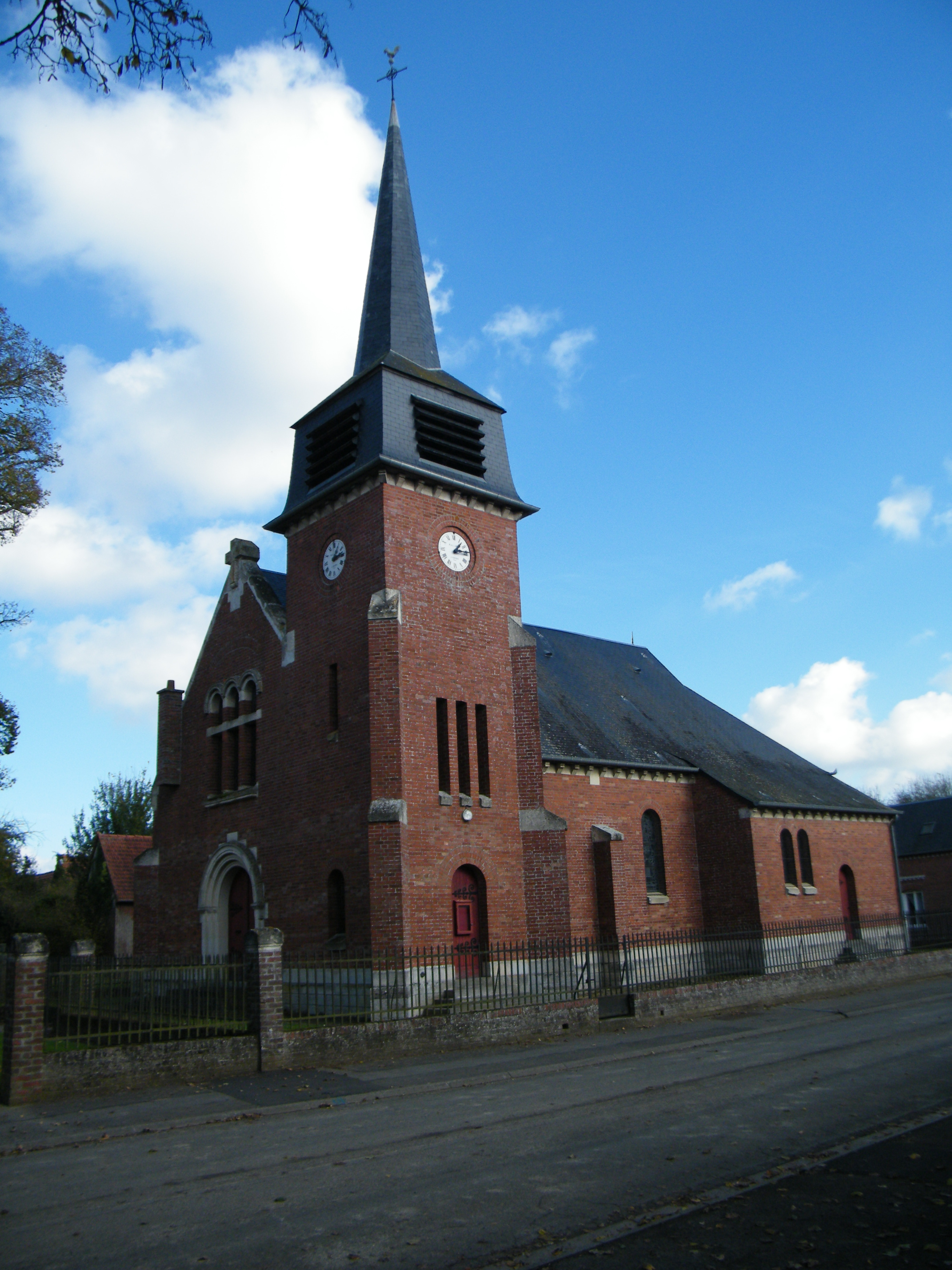
- The church in Laboissière-en-Santerre

- Coat of arms
- Location of Laboissière-en-Santerre
- Location within France Location within Hauts-de-France
- Coordinates: 49°39′59″N 2°40′42″E
- Country: France
- Region: Hauts-de-France
- Department: Somme
- Arrondissement: Montdidier
- Canton: Roye
- Intercommunality: CC Grand Roye

Government
  - Mayor (2020–2026): Xavier Ribaucourt
- Area^{1}: 7.15 km^{2} (2.76 sq mi)
- Elevation: 99 m (325 ft)
- Highest elevation: 107 m (351 ft)
- Lowest elevation: 66 m (217 ft)
- Population (2023): 134
  - Density: 18.7/km^{2} (48.5/sq mi)
- Time zone: UTC+01:00 (CET)
  - Summer (DST): UTC+02:00 (CEST)
- INSEE/Postal code: 80453 /80500
- ^{1} French Land Register data, which excludes lakes, ponds, glaciers > 1 km^{2} (0.386 sq mi or 247 acres) and river estuaries.

Laboissière-en-Santerre (French pronunciation: [labwasjɛʁ ɑ̃ sɑ̃tɛʁ], literally Laboissière in Santerre) is a commune in the Somme department in Hauts-de-France in northern France.

== Geography ==
The commune is situated on the D68 road, some 27 miles (43 km) southeast of Amiens.

== Population ==
Historical population
| Year | Pop. | ±% p.a. |
|---|---|---|
| 1968 | 191 | — |
| 1975 | 155 | −2.94% |
| 1982 | 149 | −0.56% |
| 1990 | 149 | +0.00% |
| 1999 | 120 | −2.38% |
| 2007 | 142 | +2.13% |
| 2012 | 153 | +1.50% |
| 2017 | 150 | −0.40% |
| 2023 | 134 | −1.86% |
Source: INSEE

== See also ==
- Communes of the Somme department
