= Courdemanche =

Courdemanche may refer to the following communes in France:

- Courdemanche, Eure, in the Eure département
- Courdemanche, Sarthe, in the Sarthe département
