= Tilloloy =

- Commune
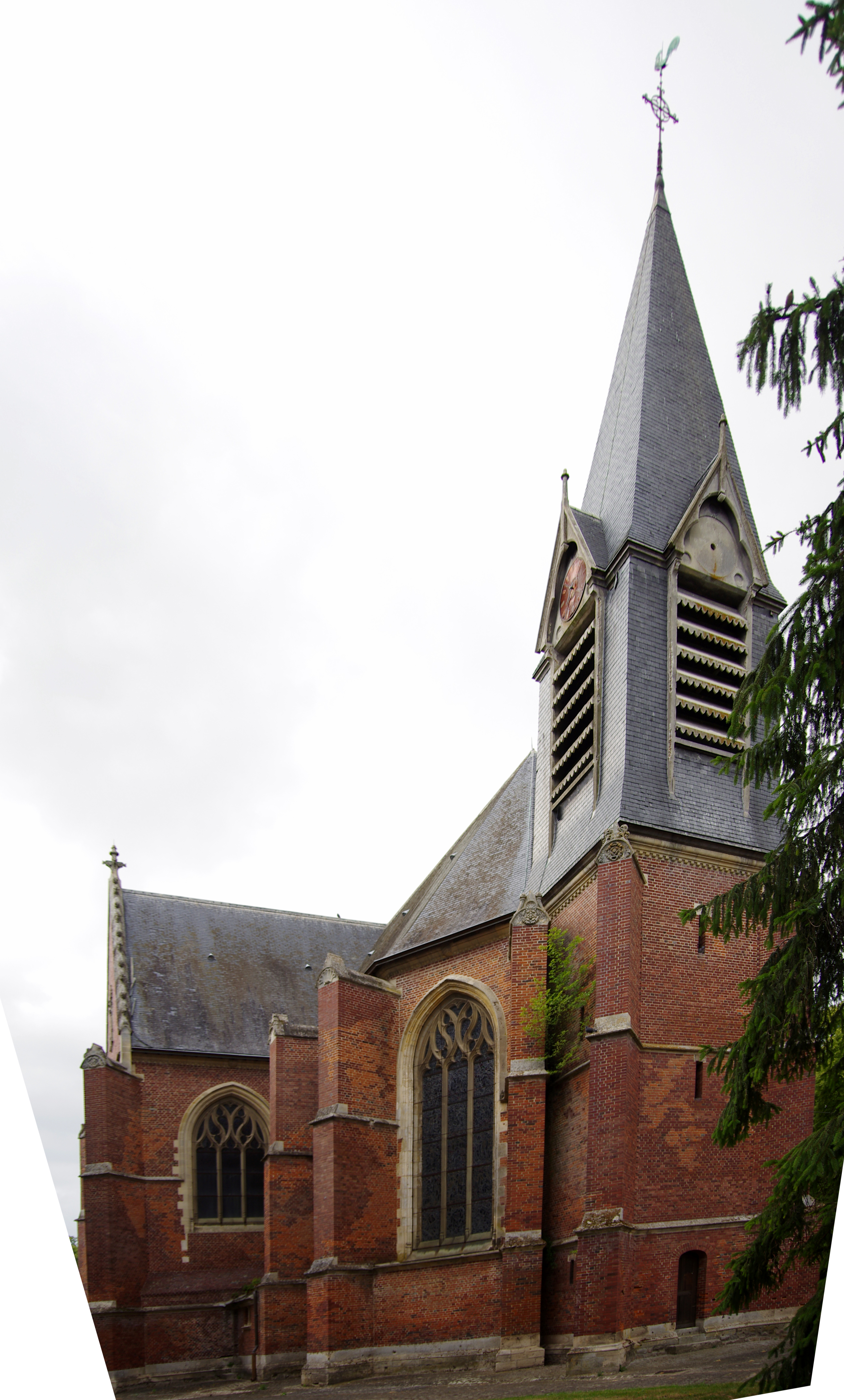
- L'église Notre-Dame de Lorette

- Coat of arms
- Location of Tilloloy
- Location within France Location within Hauts-de-France
- Coordinates: 49°38′38″N 2°44′55″E
- Country: France
- Region: Hauts-de-France
- Department: Somme
- Arrondissement: Montdidier
- Canton: Roye
- Intercommunality: CC Grand Roye

Government
  - Mayor (2020–2026): Gérard Comyn
- Area^{1}: 6.37 km^{2} (2.46 sq mi)
- Elevation: 110 m (360 ft)
- Highest elevation: 109 m (358 ft)
- Lowest elevation: 87 m (285 ft)
- Population (2023): 318
  - Density: 49.9/km^{2} (129/sq mi)
- Time zone: UTC+01:00 (CET)
  - Summer (DST): UTC+02:00 (CEST)
- INSEE/Postal code: 80759 /80700
- ^{1} French Land Register data, which excludes lakes, ponds, glaciers > 1 km^{2} (0.386 sq mi or 247 acres) and river estuaries.

Tilloloy is a commune in the Somme department in Hauts-de-France in northern France.

== Geography ==
Tilloloy is situated in the east of the department 29 miles (47 km) southeast of Amiens, on the N17 road. The border with the Oise department is less than 1 mile (2 km) away.

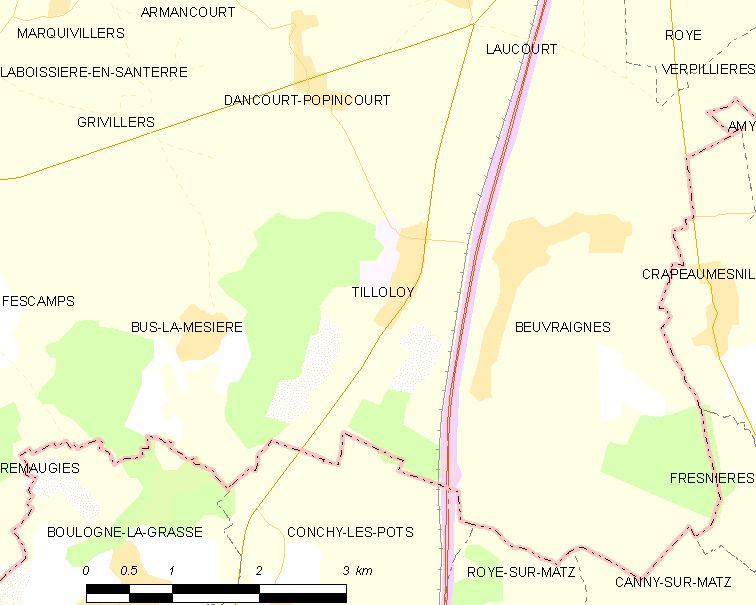

== Population ==
Historical population
Year	Pop.	±% p.a.
1968	386	—
1975	414	+1.01%
1982	378	−1.29%
1990	372	−0.20%
1999	388	+0.47%
2007	385	−0.10%
2012	347	−2.06%
2017	353	+0.34%
2023	318	−1.73%
Source: INSEE

== Personalities ==
- Blaise Cendrars recounts in "La Main coupée" that the Foreign Legion squad he commanded in 1916 rested up in Tilloloy.

== Places of interest ==
- The village church (shown in the lede image), which was subject of a painting by artist Maurice Denis.
- The seventeenth-century château of Tilloloy; extensively damaged in the First World War, subsequently restored.
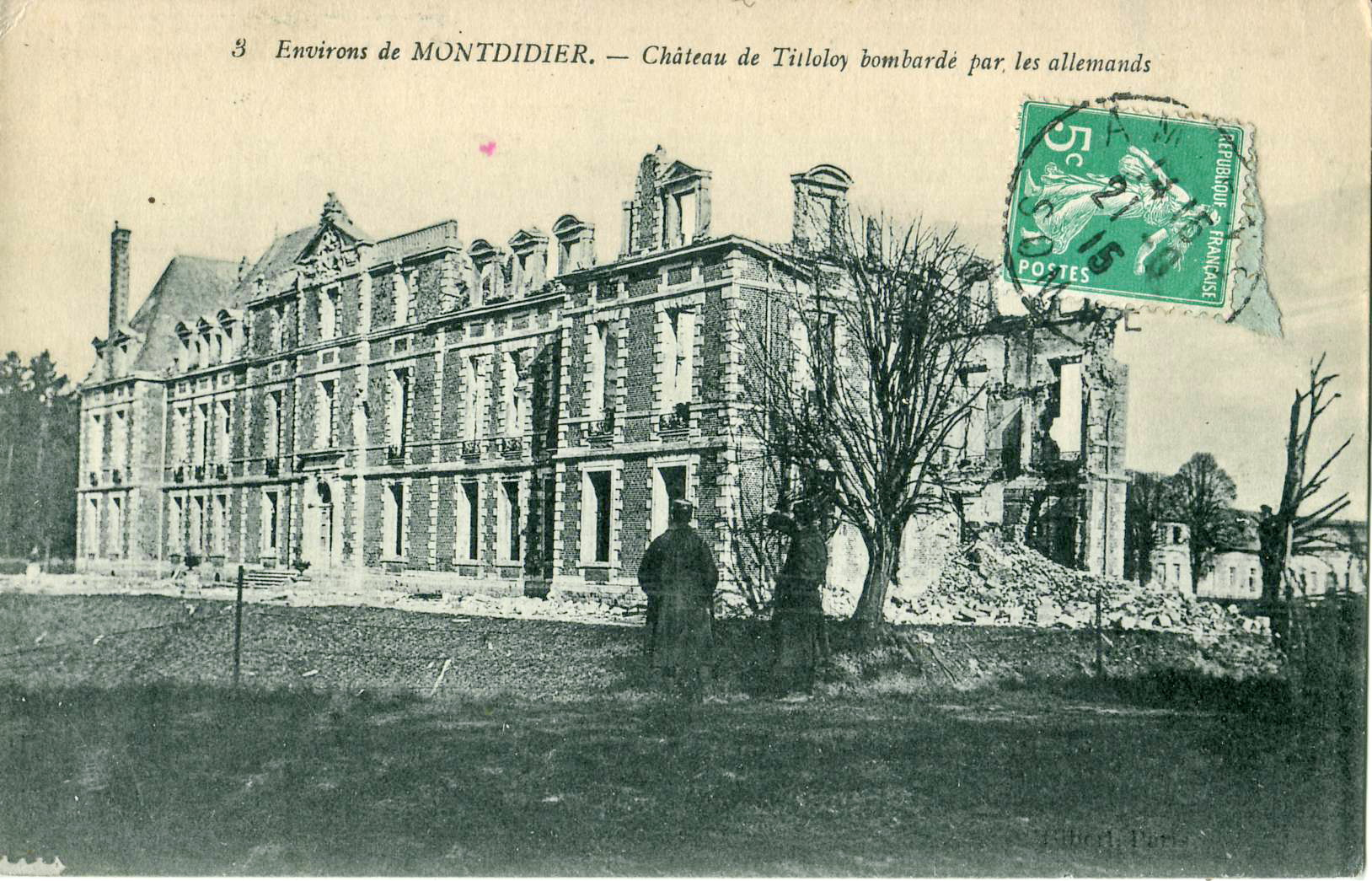
Château de Tilloloy with war-damage; front, photographic postcard circa 1915.

A view from inside the ruined château in 1917, facing the rear "quadrangle"; painting on a war-charity art postcard.

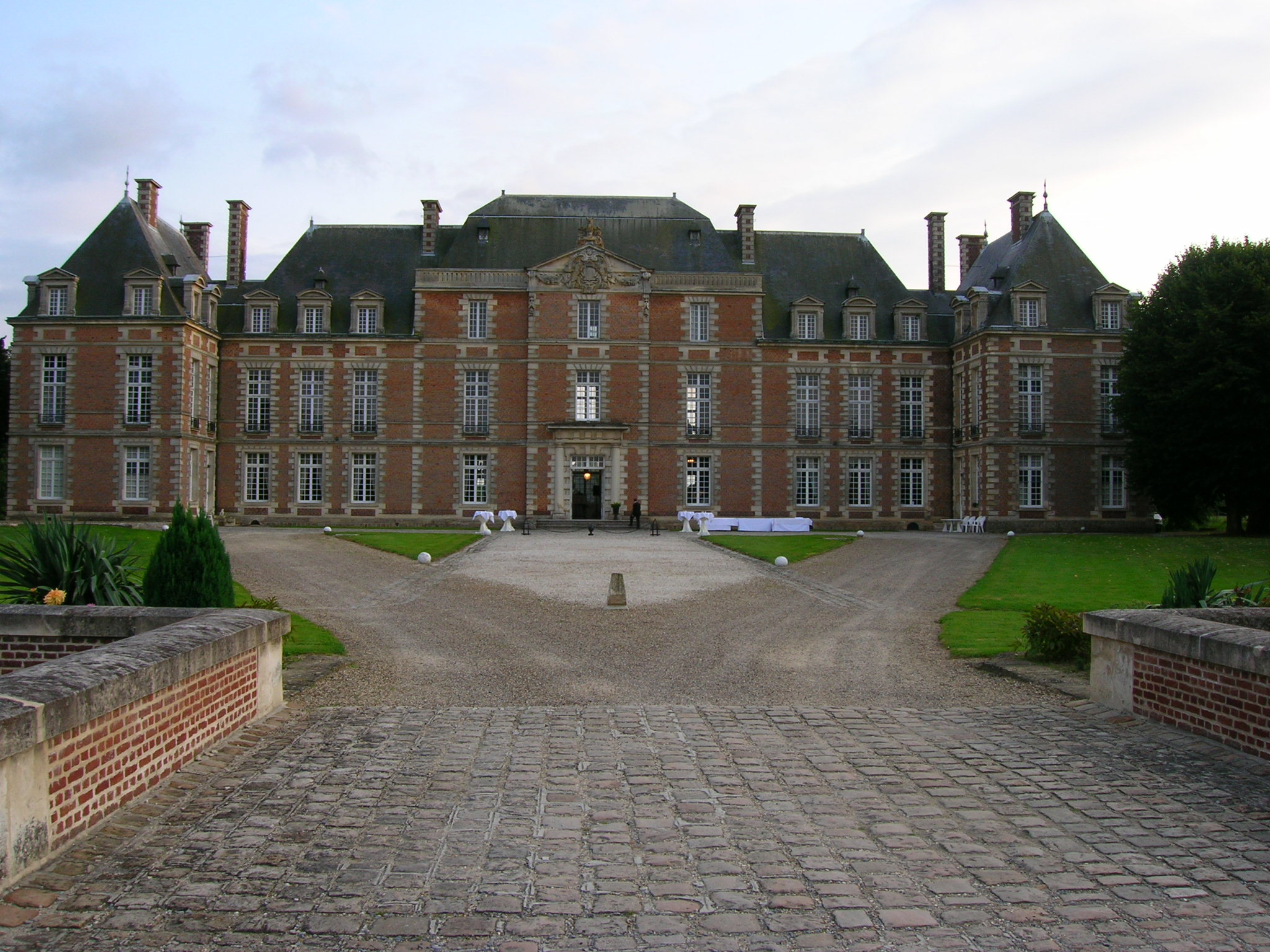
The rebuilt château, main facade; circa 2007.

== See also ==
- Communes of the Somme department
