= Becquigny, Somme =

Becquigny
- Commune
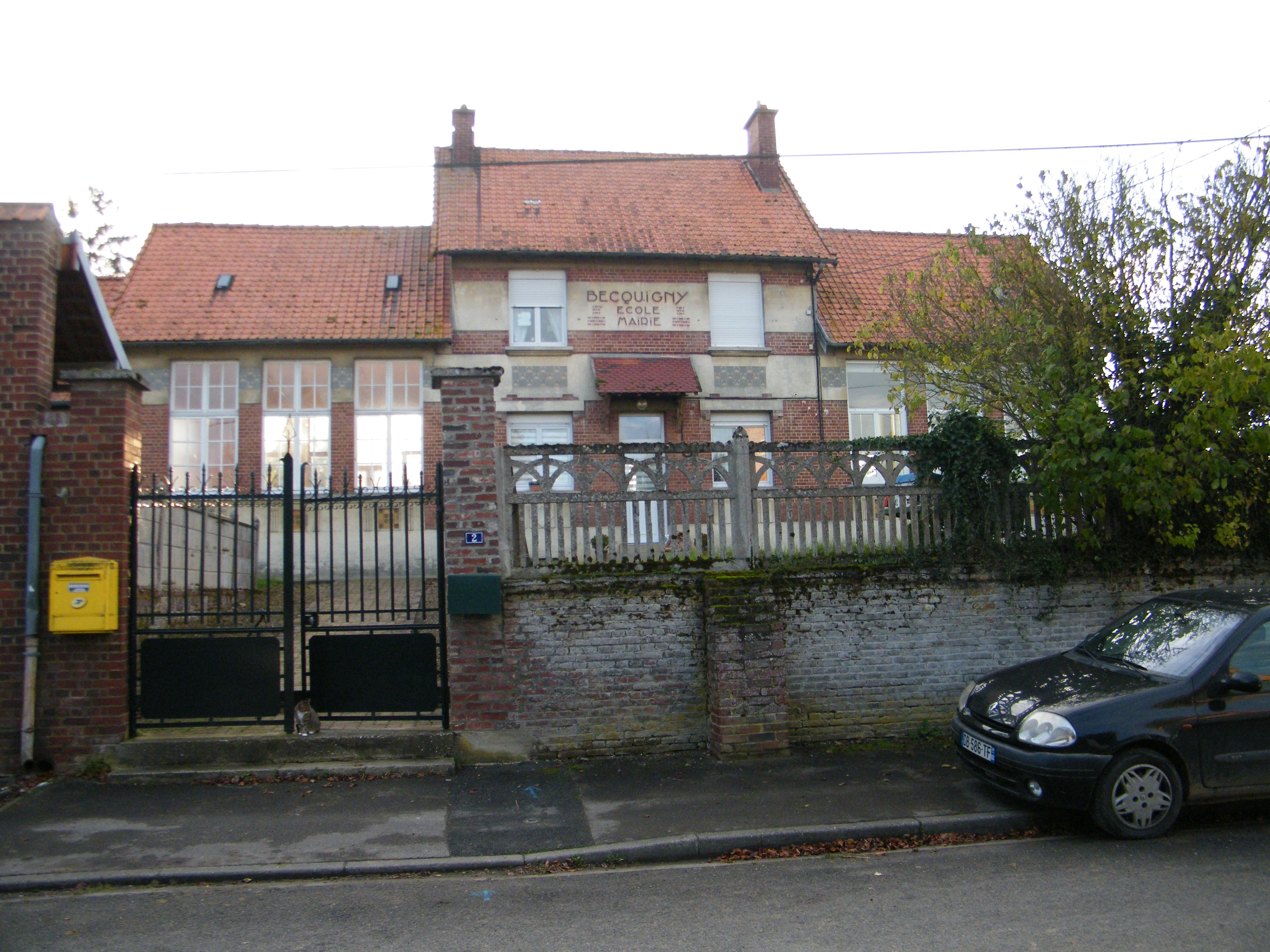
- The town hall and school of Becquigny

- Coat of arms
- Location of Becquigny
- Location within France Location within Hauts-de-France
- Coordinates: 49°41′47″N 2°37′26″E
- Country: France
- Region: Hauts-de-France
- Department: Somme
- Arrondissement: Montdidier
- Canton: Roye
- Intercommunality: CC Grand Roye

Government
  - Mayor (2020–2026): Philippe D'Hulst
- Area^{1}: 6.04 km^{2} (2.33 sq mi)
- Elevation: 59 m (194 ft)
- Highest elevation: 107 m (351 ft)
- Lowest elevation: 50 m (160 ft)
- Population (2023): 109
  - Density: 18.0/km^{2} (46.7/sq mi)
- Time zone: UTC+01:00 (CET)
  - Summer (DST): UTC+02:00 (CEST)
- INSEE/Postal code: 80074 /80500
- ^{1} French Land Register data, which excludes lakes, ponds, glaciers > 1 km^{2} (0.386 sq mi or 247 acres) and river estuaries.

Becquigny (French pronunciation: [bɛkiɲi]) is a commune in the Somme department in Hauts-de-France in northern France.

== Geography ==
Becquigny is a small village on the left bank of the river Avre. Situated on the D214 road, some 20 miles (32 km) southeast of Amiens.

== Population ==
Historical population
Year	Pop.	±% p.a.
1968	142	—
1975	105	−4.22%
1982	103	−0.27%
1990	97	−0.75%
1999	99	+0.23%
2007	105	+0.74%
2012	108	+0.57%
2017	131	+3.94%
2023	109	−3.02%
Source: INSEE

== History ==
- Archeological investigations have found Gallo-Roman traces in the village.
- The town, mentioned for the first time in 1119, was rebuilt after being destroyed in 1163. It belonged to the Abbey of Saint Corneille of Compiègne, and the Roye family were at sometime lords of the manor.
- As with many towns of the Somme, Becquigny underwent the ravages of World War I.

== Places and monuments ==
- In the cemetery are the ruins of a magnificent chapel that once belonged to the Order of the Templars. The 12th century gate is a fine example of Romanesque architecture.

== See also ==
- Communes of the Somme department
