= Villers-Tournelle =

- Commune
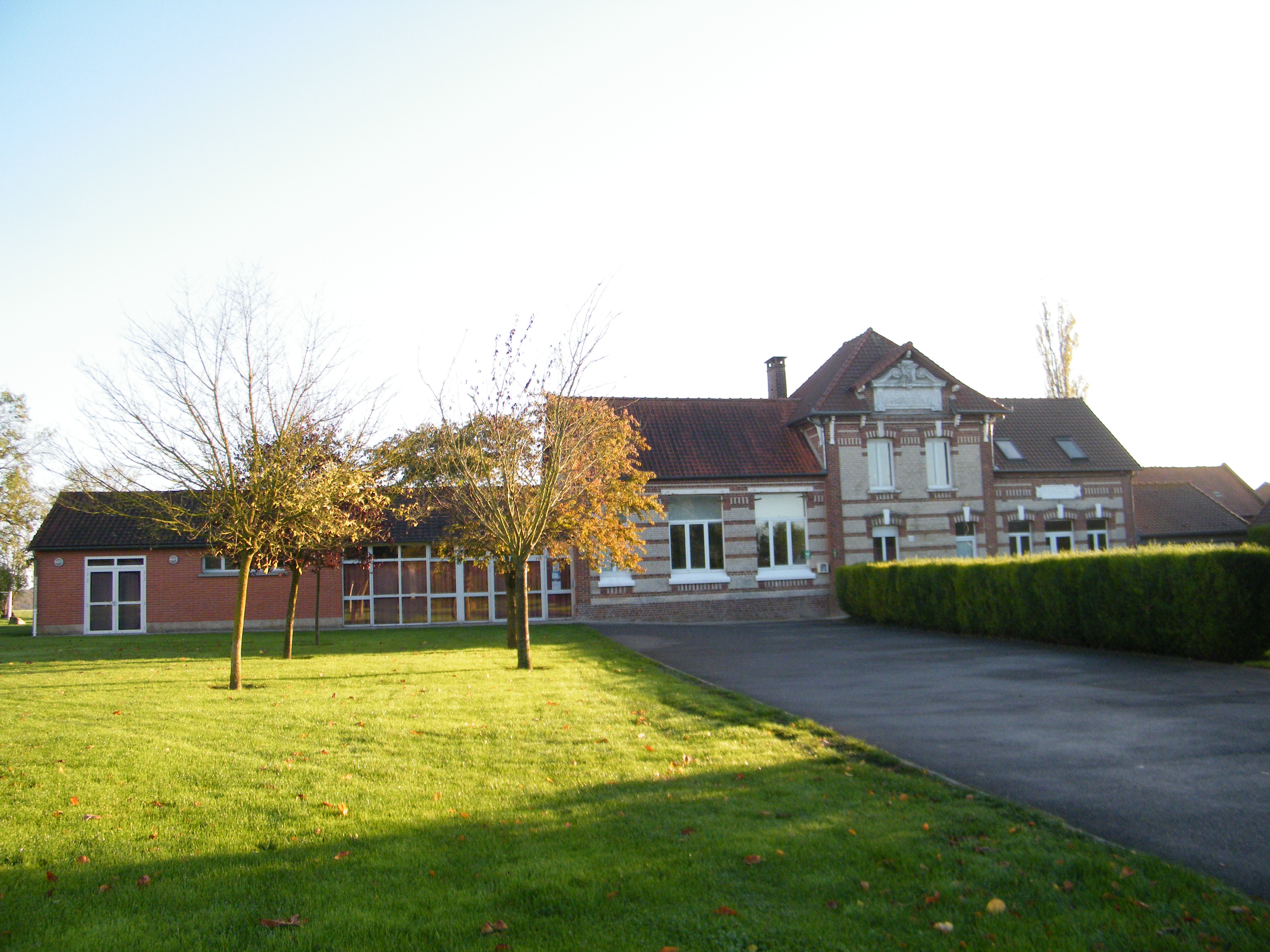
- The town hall and school in Villers-Tournelle

- Coat of arms
- Location of Villers-Tournelle
- Location within France Location within Hauts-de-France
- Coordinates: 49°39′15″N 2°27′52″E
- Country: France
- Region: Hauts-de-France
- Department: Somme
- Arrondissement: Montdidier
- Canton: Roye
- Intercommunality: CC Grand Roye

Government
  - Mayor (2020–2026): Hugues-Nicolas Neuville
- Area^{1}: 5.93 km^{2} (2.29 sq mi)
- Elevation: 114 m (374 ft)
- Highest elevation: 155 m (509 ft)
- Lowest elevation: 75 m (246 ft)
- Population (2023): 160
  - Density: 27/km^{2} (70/sq mi)
- Time zone: UTC+01:00 (CET)
  - Summer (DST): UTC+02:00 (CEST)
- INSEE/Postal code: 80805 /80500
- ^{1} French Land Register data, which excludes lakes, ponds, glaciers > 1 km^{2} (0.386 sq mi or 247 acres) and river estuaries.

Villers-Tournelle (French pronunciation: [vilɛʁ tuʁnɛl]; Picard: Vilèr-Tornelle) is a commune in the Somme department in Hauts-de-France in northern France.

== Geography ==
The commune is situated 27 km (16 miles) southeast of Amiens, on the D188 road

== Population ==
Historical population
Year	Pop.	±% p.a.
1968	135	—
1975	143	+0.83%
1982	138	−0.51%
1990	108	−3.02%
1999	146	+3.41%
2007	157	+0.91%
2012	157	+0.00%
2017	155	−0.26%
2023	160	+0.53%
Source: INSEE

== See also ==
- Communes of the Somme department
