= Canton of Roye =

Coordinates: 49°42′3″N 2°47′28″E

Roye
- Canton
- Interactive map of Roye
- Country: France
- Region: Hauts-de-France
- Department: Somme
- No. of communes: {{{nbcomm}}}
- Area: 385.25 km^{2} (148.75 sq mi)
- Population (2023): 25,273
  - Density: 65.602/km^{2} (169.91/sq mi)
- INSEE code: 80 22

The Canton of Roye is a canton situated in the department of the Somme and in the former Picardy region of northern France.

== Geography ==
The canton is organised around the commune of Roye in the arrondissement of Montdidier.

== Composition ==
At the French canton reorganisation which came into effect in March 2015, the canton was expanded from 33 to 62 communes:

- Andechy
- Armancourt
- Assainvillers
- Ayencourt
- Balâtre
- Becquigny
- Beuvraignes
- Biarre
- Bouillancourt-la-Bataille
- Boussicourt
- Bus-la-Mésière
- Cantigny
- Le Cardonnois
- Carrépuis
- Champien
- Courtemanche
- Crémery
- Cressy-Omencourt
- Damery
- Dancourt-Popincourt
- Davenescourt
- L'Échelle-Saint-Aurin
- Erches
- Ercheu
- Étalon
- Ételfay
- Faverolles
- Fescamps
- Fignières
- Fonches-Fonchette
- Fontaine-sous-Montdidier
- Fresnoy-lès-Roye
- Goyencourt
- Gratibus
- Grivillers
- Gruny
- Guerbigny
- Hattencourt
- Herly
- Laboissière-en-Santerre
- Laucourt
- Liancourt-Fosse
- Lignières
- Malpart
- Marché-Allouarde
- Marestmontiers
- Marquivillers
- Mesnil-Saint-Georges
- Montdidier
- Piennes-Onvillers
- Remaugies
- Roiglise
- Rollot
- Roye
- Rubescourt
- Saint-Mard
- Tilloloy
- Trois-Rivières
- Verpillières
- Villers-lès-Roye
- Villers-Tournelle
- Warsy

== Population ==
Historical population
Year	Pop.	±% p.a.
2013	24,792	—
2018	24,512	−0.23%
Source: INSEE

== See also ==
- Arrondissements of the Somme department
- Cantons of the Somme department
- Communes of the Somme department
