= Fontaine-sous-Montdidier =

- Commune
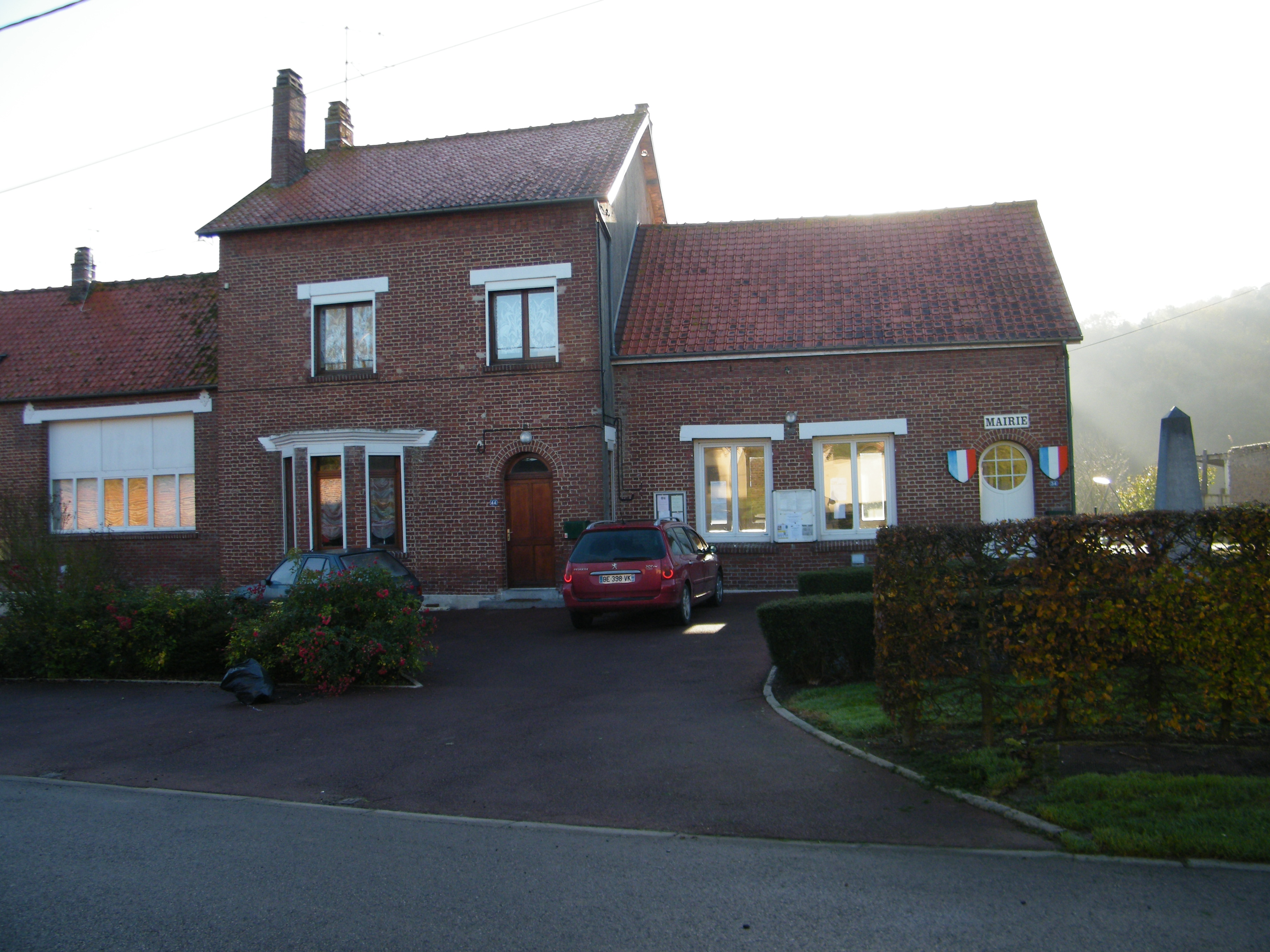
- The town hall and school in Fontaine-sous-Montdidier
- Location of Fontaine-sous-Montdidier
- Location within France Location within Hauts-de-France
- Coordinates: 49°39′27″N 2°31′10″E
- Country: France
- Region: Hauts-de-France
- Department: Somme
- Arrondissement: Montdidier
- Canton: Roye
- Intercommunality: CC Grand Roye

Government
  - Mayor (2020–2026): Dominique Fievez
- Area^{1}: 9.03 km^{2} (3.49 sq mi)
- Elevation: 100 m (330 ft)
- Highest elevation: 127 m (417 ft)
- Lowest elevation: 46 m (151 ft)
- Population (2023): 97
  - Density: 11/km^{2} (28/sq mi)
- Time zone: UTC+01:00 (CET)
  - Summer (DST): UTC+02:00 (CEST)
- INSEE/Postal code: 80326 /80500
- ^{1} French Land Register data, which excludes lakes, ponds, glaciers > 1 km^{2} (0.386 sq mi or 247 acres) and river estuaries.

Fontaine-sous-Montdidier (French pronunciation: [fɔ̃tɛn su mɔ̃didje], literally Fontaine under Montdidier; Picard: Fontainne-dsou-Montdidji) is a commune in the Somme department in Hauts-de-France in northern France.

== Geography ==
The commune is situated on the D26 road, 40 kilometres (25 mi) southeast of Amiens.

== Population ==
Historical population
Year	Pop.	±% p.a.
1968	98	—
1975	89	−1.37%
1982	88	−0.16%
1990	94	+0.83%
1999	119	+2.65%
2007	122	+0.31%
2012	119	−0.50%
2017	108	−1.92%
2023	97	−1.77%
Source: INSEE

== See also ==
- Communes of the Somme department
