= Courtemanche =

- Commune
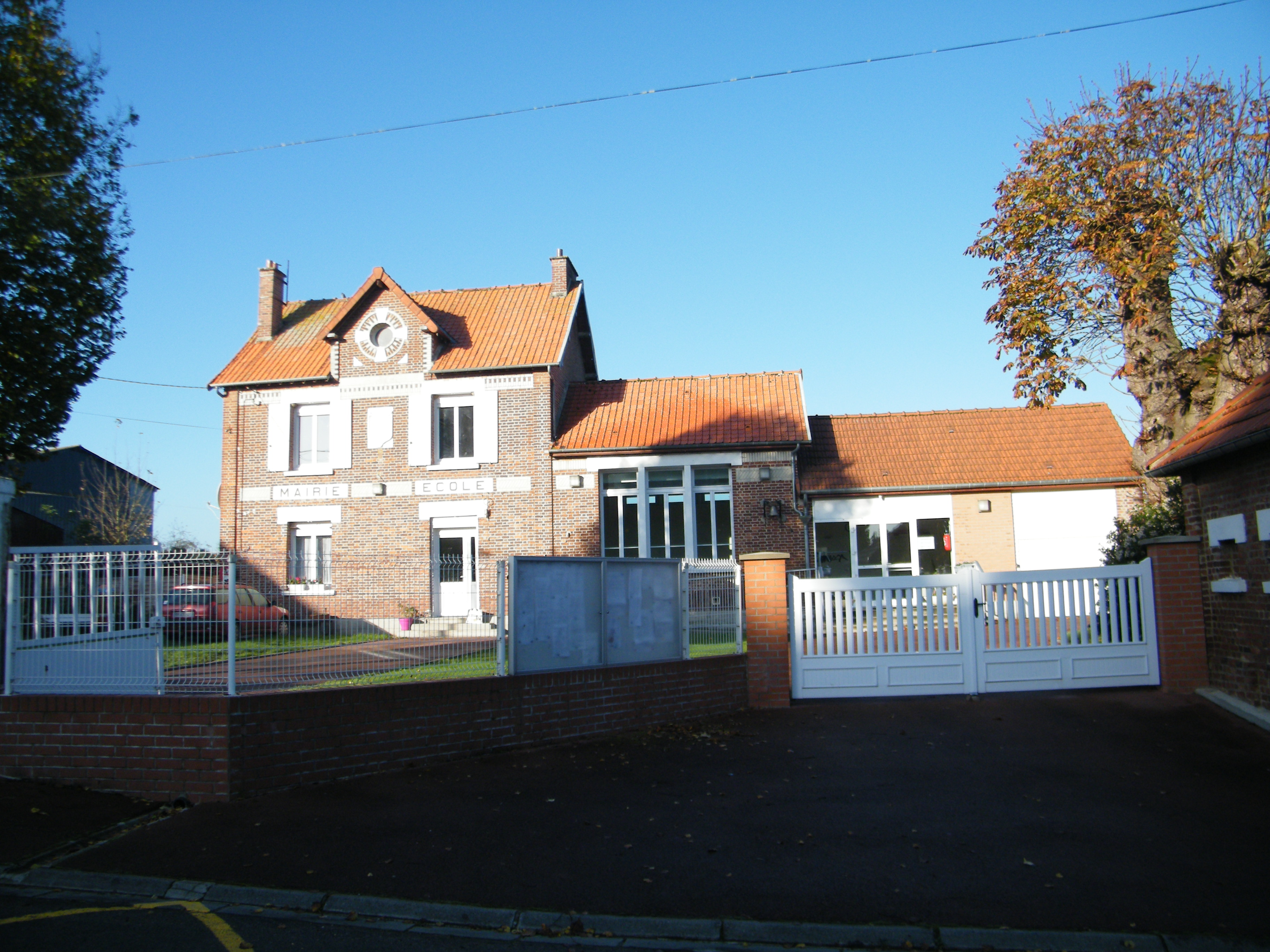
- The town hall and echool in Courtemanche
- Location of Courtemanche
- Location within France Location within Hauts-de-France
- Coordinates: 49°39′45″N 2°32′24″E
- Country: France
- Region: Hauts-de-France
- Department: Somme
- Arrondissement: Montdidier
- Canton: Roye
- Intercommunality: CC Grand Roye

Government
  - Mayor (2020–2026): Emile Foirest
- Area^{1}: 4.15 km^{2} (1.60 sq mi)
- Elevation: 60 m (200 ft)
- Highest elevation: 116 m (381 ft)
- Lowest elevation: 50 m (160 ft)
- Population (2023): 99
  - Density: 24/km^{2} (62/sq mi)
- Time zone: UTC+01:00 (CET)
  - Summer (DST): UTC+02:00 (CEST)
- INSEE/Postal code: 80220 /80500
- ^{1} French Land Register data, which excludes lakes, ponds, glaciers > 1 km^{2} (0.386 sq mi or 247 acres) and river estuaries.

Courtemanche (French pronunciation: [kuʁtəmɑ̃ʃ]; Picard: Corteminche) is a commune in the Somme department in Hauts-de-France in northern France.

== Geography ==
Courtemanche is situated on the D155 road, some 30 miles (48 km) southeast of Amiens.

== Population ==
Historical population
Year	Pop.	±% p.a.
1968	75	—
1975	63	−2.46%
1982	72	+1.93%
1990	81	+1.48%
1999	83	+0.27%
2007	93	+1.43%
2012	96	+0.64%
2017	102	+1.22%
2023	99	−0.50%
Source: INSEE

== See also ==
- Communes of the Somme department
