= Manchester Artillery =

7th Lancashire Artillery Volunteers (The Manchester Artillery) II East Lancashire Brigade (The Manchester Artillery), RFA 52nd (Manchester) Field Regiment, RA 252 (Manchester) Field Regiment, RA 209 (Manchester Artillery) Battery, RA
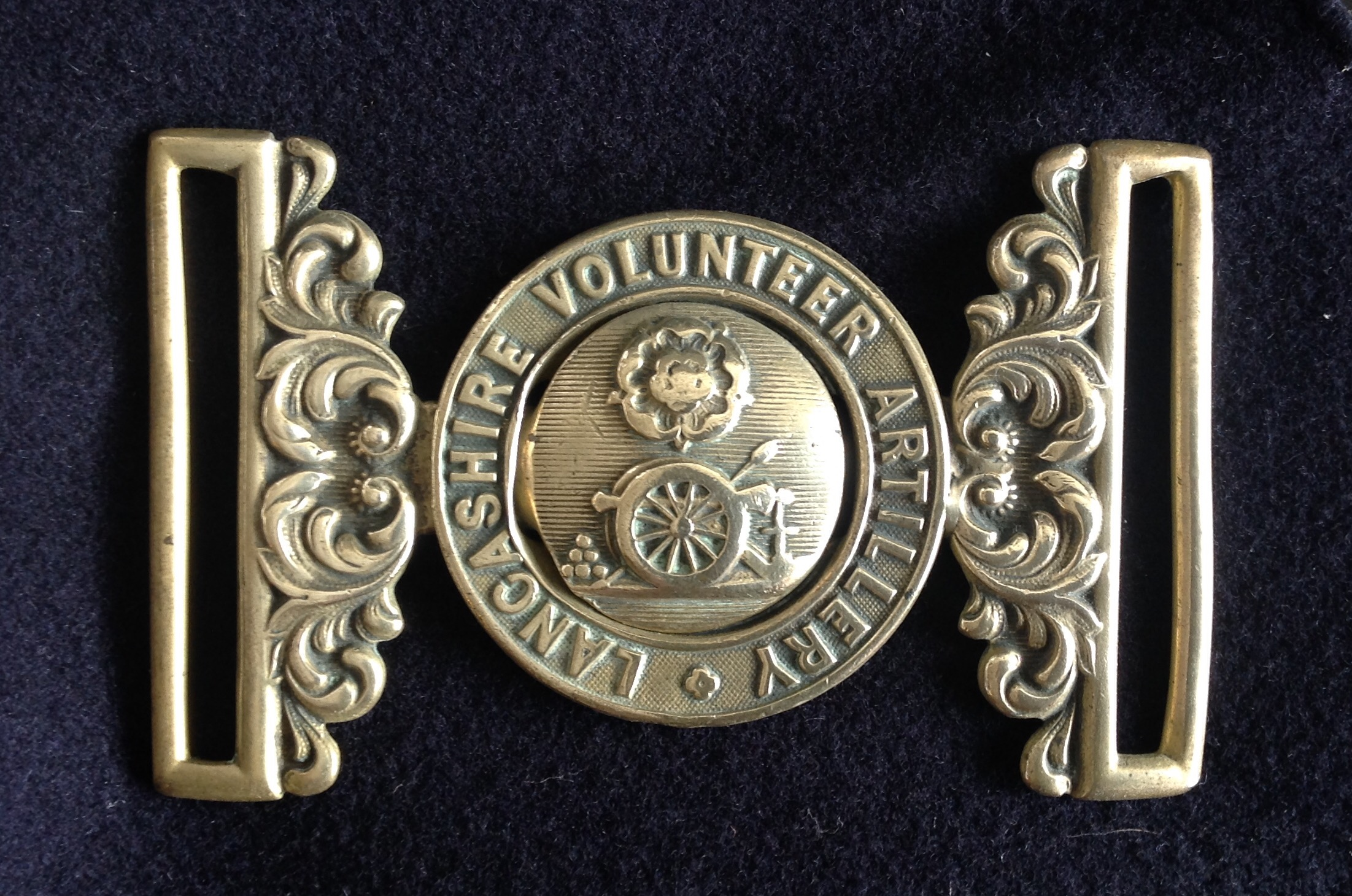
- Waistbelt of the Lancashire Volunteer Artillery, post-1891
- Active: 17 August 1860–present
- Country: United Kingdom
- Branch: Volunteer Force/Territorial Force
- Role: Garrison artillery Position artillery Field artillery Anti-Aircraft Artillery
- Garrison/HQ: Hyde Road, Ardwick, Manchester
- Engagements: World War I: Egypt; Spring Offensive; Hundred Days' Offensive; World War I: Battle of France; Italian Campaign; North West Europe

The Manchester Artillery is a Volunteer unit of the British Army first raised in the City of Manchester in 1860, whose successors continue to serve in the Army Reserve today. It became a brigade of the Royal Field Artillery in the Territorial Force in 1908, and in World War I it served in Egypt in 1915–17 before being broken up. Its second line unit went to the Western Front in 1917, seeing action at Ypres, against the German Spring Offensive, and leading the pursuit in the Allies' victorious Hundred Days Offensive. Just before World War II the Manchester Artillery again formed a duplicate. While the parent regiment served in the Battle of France including the Dunkirk evacuation, and later in the Middle East and the Italian campaign, its duplicate fought in Normandy and North West Europe. Both regiments were reformed postwar, but after a number of amalgamations they and several other Manchester-based units were reduced into 209 (Manchester Artillery) Battery in the present-day Army Reserve.

== Volunteer Force ==
The enthusiasm for the Volunteer movement following an invasion scare in 1859 saw the creation of many Volunteer Corps composed of part-time soldiers eager to supplement the Regular British Army in time of need. A large number of independent Artillery Volunteer Corps (AVCs) were formed across Lancashire, including the 19th (Manchester) AVC, formed as a subdivision in Manchester on 17 August 1860, becoming a full battery by the following month. It formed a 2nd Battery on 14 December 1860, a 3rd and 4th on 22 January 1861, and the 5th and 6th on 6 May 1863, when John Isaac Mawson (director of the Lancashire Steel Company and designer of Blackpool's Central Pier) was commissioned as lieutenant-colonel in command. While many smaller AVCs were grouped into administrative brigades, the 19th Lancashire was large enough to stand on its own, and the single-battery 15th (Garston and Hale) Lancashire AVC (formed at Garston, Liverpool on 2 April 1860) was attached to it between 1863 and 1867. The 1st (Manchester) Lancashire Light Horse Volunteers (formed on 22 March 1860 as the 1st Lancashire (Manchester) Mounted Rifle Volunteers) was also attached to the 19th AVC from 1871 until its disbandment in 1873.

On 4 February 1870 Lt-Col Mawson became the unit's Honorary Colonel and Major Thomas Sowler (a newspaper proprietor who had first joined the 19th AVC as a gunner) was promoted to lt-col to succeed him as commanding officer (CO). On 14 June 1876 Maj Ralph Peacock (of the Manchester locomotive manufacturers Beyer, Peacock & Company) was promoted to the command in turn (Sowler later succeeded Mawson as Hon Col). By this time the unit's headquarters (HQ) was given as Hyde Road, Manchester. When the Volunteers were consolidated in 1880 the 19th Lancashire AVC became the 7th Lancashire AVC, and the following year its full title became 7th Lancashire (The Manchester Artillery) AVC. The unit became part of the Lancashire Division of the Royal Artillery (RA) from 1 April 1882. When the RA's divisional structure was reorganised on 1 July 1889, the 7th Lancashire became part of the Southern Division.

As well as manning fixed garrison artillery, some of the early Artillery Volunteers manned semi-mobile 'position batteries' of smooth-bore field guns pulled by agricultural horses. But the War Office refused to pay for the upkeep of field guns for Volunteers and they had largely died out in the 1870s. In 1888 the 'position artillery' concept was revived and some Volunteer companies were reorganised as position batteries to work alongside the Volunteer infantry brigades. By 1890 the whole of the 7th Lancashire Volunteer Artillery was organised as position batteries. Lieutenant-Col Richard K. Birley took over as CO on 25 March 1891.

On 1 June 1899 all the Volunteer artillery units became part of the Royal Garrison Artillery (RGA) and with the abolition of the RA's divisional organisation on 1 January 1902, the unit became the 7th Lancashire (The Manchester Artillery) Royal Garrison Artillery (Volunteers). 'Position artillery' was redesignated 'heavy artillery' in May 1902.

== Territorial Force ==
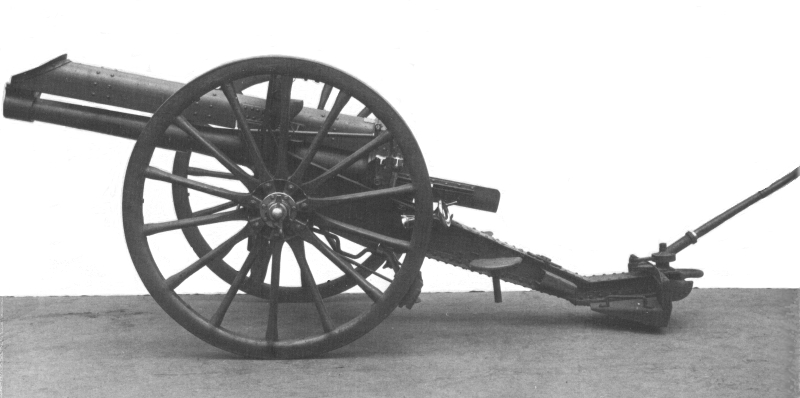
15-pounder gun issued to TF field batteries.

When the Volunteers were subsumed into the new Territorial Force (TF) under the Haldane Reforms of 1908, the unit became the II (or 2nd) East Lancashire Brigade, Royal Field Artillery (TF), consisting of the 15th, 16th and 17th Lancashire Batteries and the II East Lancashire Brigade Ammunition Column. The brigade formed part of the divisional artillery for the TF's East Lancashire Division and was equipped with four 15-pounder field guns to each battery From 23 March 1913 the brigade was commanded by Lt-Col Harry Sowler, son of Sir Thomas, the former Hon Col.

== World War I ==
=== Mobilisation ===
Units of the East Lancashire Division had been on their annual training when war came: on 3 August they were recalled to their drill halls and at 17.30 next day the order to mobilise was received. The men were billeted within reach of their drill halls while the mobilisation process went on.

On 10 August, TF units were invited to volunteer for overseas service. The infantry brigades of the East Lancashire Division volunteered within two days and soon 90 per cent of the division had signed up. On 15 August 1914, the War Office issued instructions to separate those men who had opted for Home Service only, and form these into reserve units. On 31 August, the formation of a reserve or 2nd Line unit was authorised for each 1st Line unit where 60 per cent or more of the men had volunteered for Overseas Service. The titles of these 2nd Line units would be the same as the original, but distinguished by a '2/' prefix and would absorb the flood of volunteers coming forwards. In this way duplicate batteries, brigades and divisions were created, mirroring those TF formations being sent overseas.

=== 1/II East Lancashire Brigade ===
42nd (East Lancashire) Division's formation sign.

On 20 August the East Lancashire Division moved into camps around Bolton, Bury and Rochdale, and on 5 September it received orders to go to Egypt to complete its training and relieve Regular units from the garrison for service on the Western Front. It embarked on a convoy of troopships from Southampton on 10 September, the first TF division to go overseas. However, only two brigades of its divisional artillery accompanied it, and 1/II East Lancs was one of those left behind, spending the next few months in Manchester.

1/II East Lancs Bde did not reach Alexandria until 14 June 1915, by which time the rest of the East Lancashire Division (now designated 42nd (East Lancashire) Division) had been landed at Cape Helles on the Gallipoli Peninsula. The brigade remained in Egypt until the remnants of the division returned from the Gallipoli campaign in January 1916. 42nd (EL) Division concentrated at Mena Camp on 22 January before moving into the southern sector of the Suez Canal defences. On 27 February the brigade was rearmed with modern 18-pounder guns handed over by 29th Division as it left for the Western Front. On 31 May 1916 1/II East Lancs Bde was numbered CCXI (211) Brigade, RFA, and the batteries designated A, B and C.

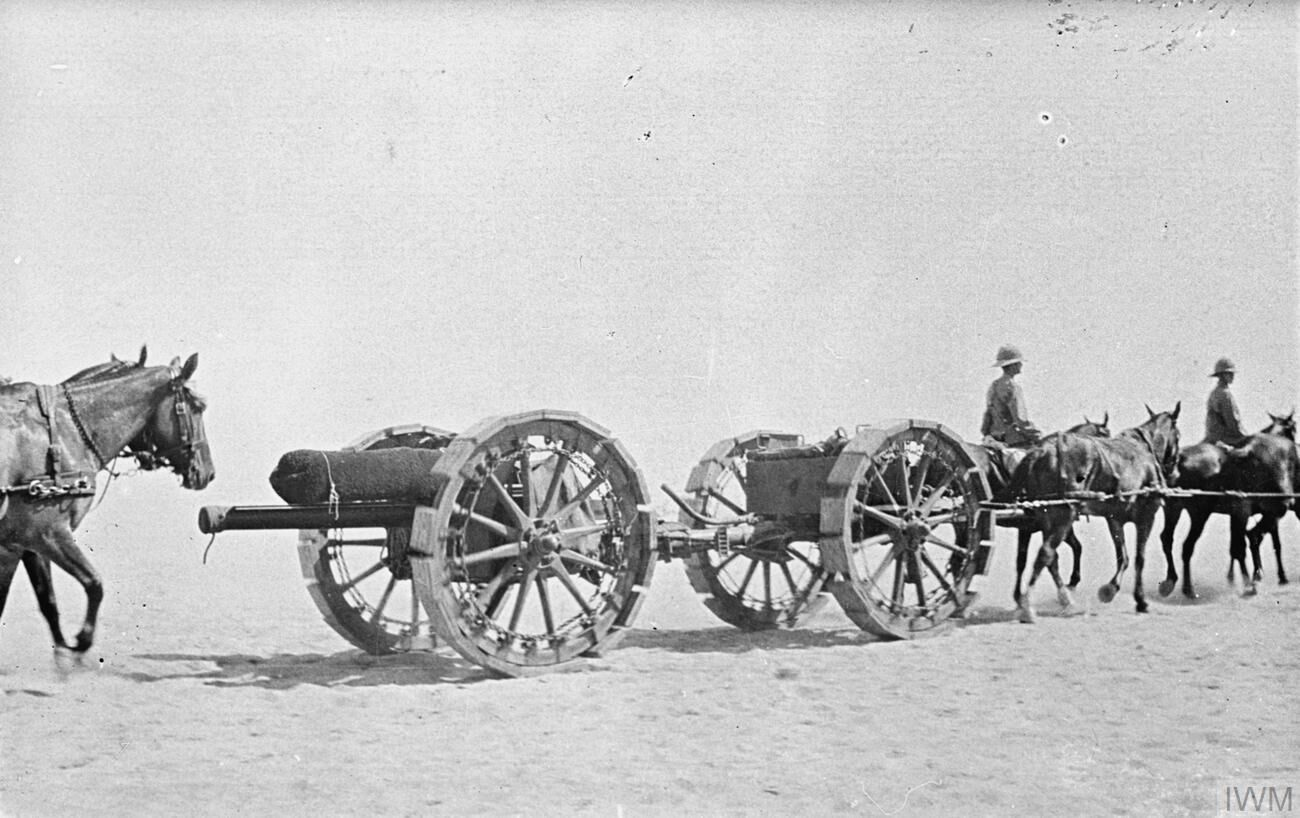
18-pounder with sand wheels in the Suez Canal area.

The canal defences were situated east of the waterway, with a string of self-contained posts, each garrisoned by an infantry battalion and an artillery battery. The division did much of the construction and trained in the desert, the gunners carrying out field firing with their new guns. The gun wheels were fitted with 'ped-rails' to assist movement across soft sand, for which 12 rather than 6 horses were harnessed to gun-carriages and limbers. In late July the division was ordered north, where a Turkish column was advancing on the defences. CCXI Brigade was stationed at El Ferdan. The Turkish force was defeated at the Battle of Romani near Pelusium on 4–5 August, after which 42nd (EL) Division set off in pursuit. The men and horses suffered badly from lack of water, but the Turks lost heavily. The division then returned to the canal posts, with A Bty of CCXI Bde at Pelusium.

For the next few months the division was part of the Desert Column covering the extension of the railway and water pipeline into the Sinai Desert to permit the Egyptian Expeditionary Force to mount an offensive into Palestine. The head of the Desert Column reached El Arish, near the Palestine frontier, on 22 December. On 25 December 1916 CCXI Bde was renumbered CCXII (exchanging numbers with the former 1/III East Lancs (Bolton Artillery)) and was reorganised, with C Bty being split between A and B to bring them up to six guns each.

On 28 January 1917, after the division reached El Arish, orders arrived for it to be sent to the Western Front. It was at Alexandria by 21 February, when CCXII Bde was broken up before the division embarked. A Battery became C Bty of CCX (formerly 1/I East Lancs) Bde, and B Bty became C Bty of CCXI Bde (the Bolton Artillery). The Brigade Ammunition Column did go to France, where it became No 3 Section of the reformed 42nd Divisional Ammunition Column. The two Manchester batteries fought with their new brigades in 42nd (EL) Division for the rest of the war on the Western Front, including the operations on the Flanders coast in 1917, the defence against the German Spring Offensive in March 1918, and the Allies' final Hundred Days Offensive.

=== 2/II East Lancashire Brigade ===
66th (2nd East Lancashire) Division's formation sign.

The 2nd Line units of the East Lancashire Division were raised in September and October 1914, with only a small nucleus of instructors to train the mass of volunteers. Training was slow because the 2nd Line artillery lacked guns, sights, horses, wagons and signal equipment. The 2nd East Lancashire Division, now numbered 66th (2nd EL) Division, began concentrating in Kent and Sussex in August 1915. 2/II East Lancs Bde was given four old French De Bange 90 mm guns for training, but passed these on to 69th (2nd East Anglian) Divisional Artillery in October and it was not until December that it received its 18-pdrs. In September Lt-Col Francis Hill transferred from the IV East Lancashire (Howitzer) Bde to take command of the 2/II. In early 1916 the division moved into the East Coast defences, with its artillery at Colchester.

In May 1916 the brigade was numbered as CCCXXXI (331) Brigade and the batteries designated A, B and C. The division's howitzer brigade (2/IV East Lancs) was broken up, and 2/1st Cumberland (Howitzer) Bty joined CCCXXXI Bde as D (H) Bty, equipped with 4.5-inch howitzers. 66th (2nd EL) Division's training suffered long delays caused by having to find reinforcement drafts for 42nd (EL) Division. Supplying one draft of 250 gunners in 1916 considerably delayed the whole division; these then had to be replaced by drafts from the 3rd Line (in the case of 2/II East Lancs Bde these came from 3/II East Lancs Bde at Southport and later Whitchurch, and from the brigade's administrative centre at Manchester). The division was finally ready for overseas service at the end of 1916. Before leaving England the brigade's batteries were made up to 6 guns each and a section of the former 2/2nd Cumberland (H) Bty joined from CCCXXXII Bde to bring D (H) Bty up to six howitzers, giving the final organisation of the brigade:

- A Bty (2/15th Lancashire Bty) – 6 × 18-pdr
- B Bty (2/16th Lancashire Bty) – 6 × 18-pdr
- C Bty (2/17th Lancashire Bty) – 6 × 18-pdr
- D (H) Bty (2/1st + half 2/2nd Cumberland (H) Bty) – 6 × 4.5-inch

==== Ypres ====
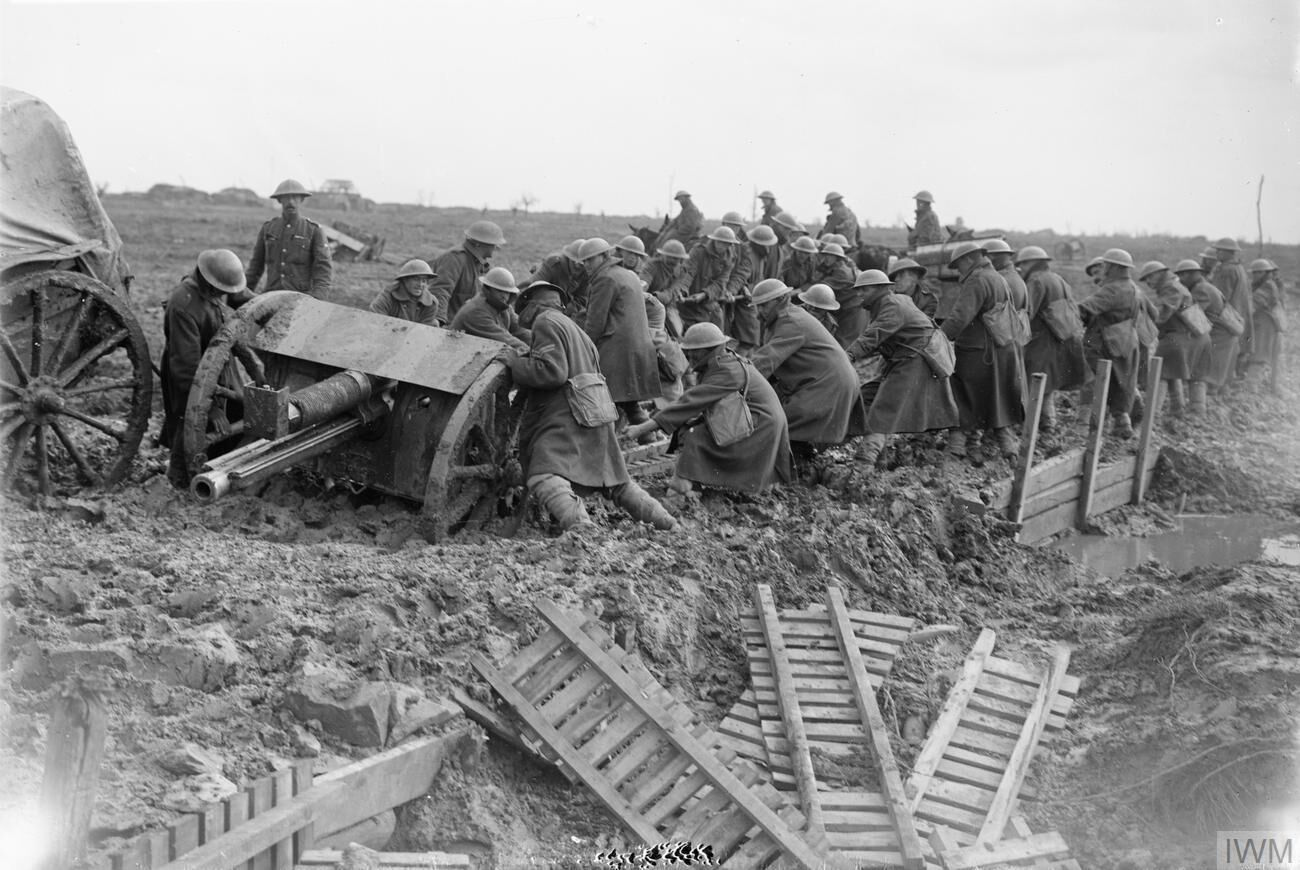
Hauling an 18-pdr out of mud, 16 October 1917.

66th (2nd EL) Division was ordered to France on 11 February 1917 and CCCXXXI Bde entrained on 11 March for Southampton, where it embarked for Le Havre. The division concentrated under First Army and CCCXXXI Bde's batteries went into the line around Cambrin. The artillery covered a number of trench raids by the division, but otherwise the front was quiet. In July the division moved to Nieuport on the Flanders Coast where British troops were being concentrated for a planned thrust up the coast in conjunction with the Third Ypres Offensive. However, the Germans launched a spoiling attack, and the expected breakthrough at Ypres failed to materialise, so the operation was cancelled. Lieutenant-Col Hill left the brigade in July and Maj H.B. O'B. Traill, a regular RGA officer, was transferred in and promoted to succeed him. 66th (2nd EL) Division was relieved by 42nd (EL) Division in October and went to the Ypres Salient. The road congestion and the mud on the Passchendaele ridge was so bad that the batteries could not all get up to their intended positions: only C Bty got into action in time to support the division's attack on 9 October (the Battle of Poelcappelle). The barrage was weak, and shells buried in the mud did no damage. The division's attack, in heavy rain, made little progress.

After the infantry of 66th (2nd EL) Division were relieved on 11 October, the guns remained in position. They were regularly under fire, and the ammunition had to be brought up by pack-horses. CCCXXXI Brigade supported the attacks by II ANZAC Corps on 12 October (the First Battle of Passchendaele) and Canadian Corps on 26 October (the Second Battle of Passchendaele). The gunners were finally relieved by 2nd Canadian Division, who took over their guns in position on 27 October. 66th Divisional Artillery then rallied at the waggon lines, taking over the Canadian guns, and marched to rest billets at Le Doulieu on 31 October. The brigade had suffered casualties of 8 killed and 65 wounded in the month. It went back into the line on 11 November, relieving Australian gunners. The final attack on Passchendaele had been made the previous day, but the guns remained under shell and gas attack on the open slopes. Major R.J. Adams was promoted to take command of CCCXXXI Bde at the end of the month.

==== Spring Offensive ====
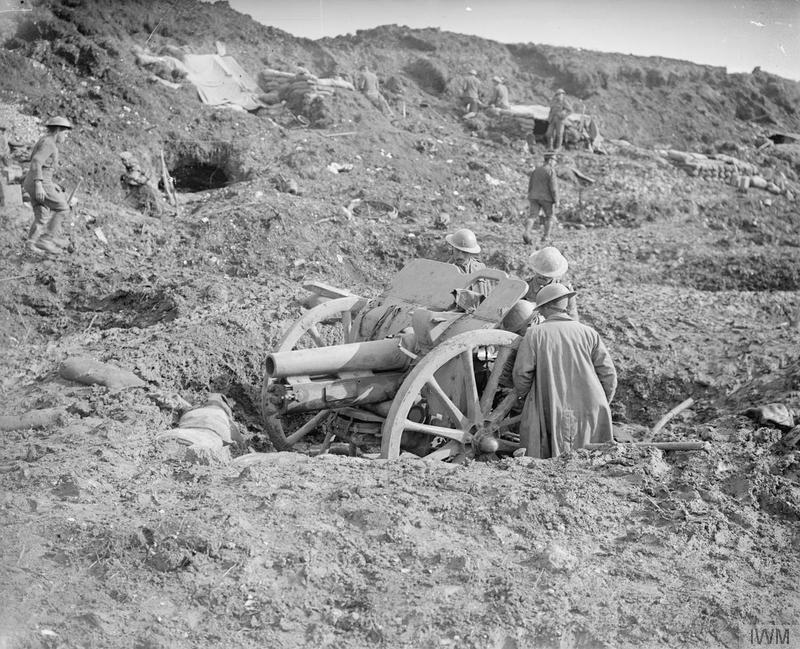
A 4.5-inch howitzer dug into a shellhole on the Western Front.

66th Divisional Artillery remained in the line at Ypres during the winter, finally reverting to the command of its parent division when that returned to the sector on 13 January 1918. The division moved south by rail in mid-February, with CCCXXXI Bde established at Ignaucourt, where it carried out intensive training. In early March it moved to Hargicourt, in 66th (2nd EL) Division's defences. These consisted of an Outpost Zone (the Blue Line) along Cologne Ridge, and a Battle Zone behind as the position of main resistance, with the Red Line in front and the Brown Line at the rear; the final line of resistance was the Green Line. The guns were disposed in depth through these zones, with fall-back positions prepared. Hargicourt itself was in the outpost zone, and brigade HQ was moved back to Templeux to be in close touch with the infantry brigade it was to support. Some 18-pdrs (one each from A and C Btys) were given an anti-tank role in anticipation of the Germans using them. The long-anticipated German Spring Offensive began at 04.30 on the morning of 21 March with a heavy 6-hour bombardment of the division's gun positions, which also cut the telephone lines and prevented runners getting through with messages. There was a heavy mist and Germans troops were able to penetrate the Blue Line before the artillery OPs could see them. The anti-tank guns were overrun and captured, though most of the two gun detachments got away. In the absence of other information the batteries fired their pre-arranged SOS tasks. 66th (2nd EL) Division defended its positions stubbornly, but about midday a section of C Bty was overrun. The mist having cleared, the batteries were now firing over open sights at ranges of 1,000 yards (910 m) to 1,500 yards (1,400 m) and about 15.00 they were ordered to withdraw. The gunners got away, but B Bty had to disable and abandon its guns. At 16.30 the brigade was ordered to prepare to defend the Brown Line. Brigade HQ moved back to Roisel, and later to Nobescourt Farm to be close to the infantry HQ. Although 66th (2nd EL) Division still held some of its Battle Zone positions at the end of the day, its casualties were heavy, and it was outflanked following the collapse of the neighbouring division to the north.

Next day the Germans again attacked under cover of mist, and were through the Brown Line by midday. The division withdrew towards the Green Line. By now some reinforcements had arrived, including 50th (Northumbrian) Division, which manned the Green Line as the 66th passed through. Lieutenant-Col J. Laird of CCCXXX Bde was now given command of 'Left Group' of field artillery covering the left half of XIX Corps, consisting of what remained of 66th DA (two of his own btys, with A, C (3 guns) and D (5 howitzers) Btys of CCCXXXI Bde), and other nearby RFA and Royal Horse Artillery units. Lieutenant-Col Adams with CCCXXXI Brigade HQ went back to the wagon lines to take charge of the withdrawal of the transport. That night the surviving units of XIX Corps, slipped away from the meagre defences of the Green Line and joined the 'Great Retreat' towards the Somme Canal. The heavy artillery and transport began crossing the canal next morning, with Laird's group coming into action at Cartigny and then Le Mesnil to support the infantry rearguards before crossing itself and taking up positions at Barleux. On 26 March the Germans forced their way across the canal and the retreat was resumed. On 28 March 66th DA crossed the River Somme. Here the division's infantry were relieved, but 66th DA fired in support of 'Carey's Force', a scratch force of engineers that held the line at Villers-Bretonneux, where the retreat ended on 29 March.

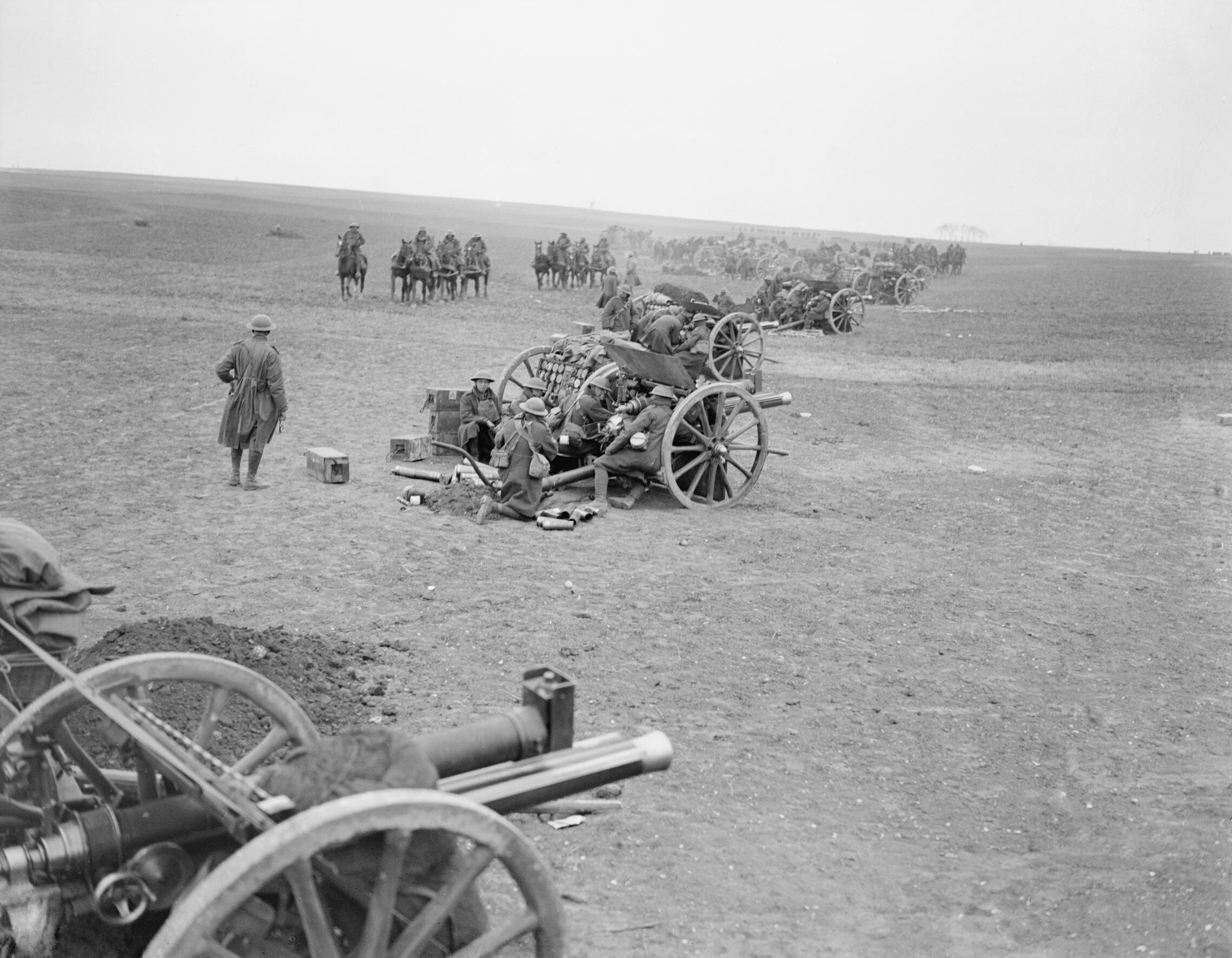
An 18-pdr battery in action in the open during the German Spring Offensive, March 1918.

66th (2nd East Lancashire) Division disappeared from the war for many months, its surviving infantry units becoming training cadres for newly-arrived American troops, but 66th DA continued as an independent artillery force. By now XIX Corps had assigned its available field artillery to cover particular sectors, regardless of the formation to which they belonged. On 30 March Lt-Col Adams took command of a group comprising C Bty of CCCXXXI Bde (6 guns) with C Bty (6 guns) and part of D Bty (2 howitzers) from CCCXXX Bde, with his HQ in Villers-Bretonneux and the batteries deployed around the station. Next day Adams' Group was joined by D/CCCXXXI Bty (4 howitzers) and A/CCCXXX Bty (4 guns), while the rest of his brigade was under Laird. During the Battle of the Avre (4 April) 66th DA (temporarily commanded by Lt-Col Adams) supported 18th (Eastern) Division, and was heavily shelled. Communications were cut so runners had to be used, and some of the batteries had to be pulled back into Villers-Bretonneux, but they achieved good results, their SOS fire stopping one attack just short of the positions of 35th Australian Battalion attached to 18th (E) Division. CCCXXXI Brigade was now organised into three four-gun batteries (B, C and D) under the command of Maj Grice-Hutchinson. 66th DA was relieved on the night of 7/8 April. Between 21 March and 13 April CCCXXXI Bde had suffered casualties of 4 officers and 35 other ranks (ORs) killed, 6 officers and 96 ORs wounded, and 3 officers and 31 ORs missing (mainly Prisoners of war).

On 16 April 66th DA was sent north by train to Second Army which was fighting the Battle of the Lys. From 20 April it formed a single composite brigade under Lt-Col Laird, with C and D Btys manned by CCCXXXI Bde. It supported 36th (Ulster) Division until 26 April, then concentrated in the Proven area to reorganise, with the batteries returning to their own brigades. With no infantry to support, the trench mortar batteries and the Small Arms Ammunition Section of the Divisional Ammunition Column were disbanded, releasing gunners and drivers to reinforce the gun batteries. By the end of the month all the batteries were back to their six-gun strength. From 14/15 to 22 May 66th DA was in action near Busseboom supporting counter-attacks by the 14th French Division, and in June and early July it covered small operations by various formations in Second Army. XIX Corps HQ then moved into the area and assigned 66th DA to support 27th US Division (which had no artillery of its own) under training in the East Poperinghe Line or 2nd Position. After a short spell in the front line when 66th DA relieved 41st Divisional Artillery for an operation near Kemmel, 66th DA returned to the East Poperinghe Line and briefly joined 30th US Division.

==== Hundred Days ====
The Allied Hundred Days Offensive was now under way, and 66th DA's batteries began moving forward on 1 September, supporting various divisions advancing on the River Lys, including 40th Division from 7 September. On 11 September, near Steenwerck, CCCXXXI Bde took over responsibility for protecting the division's advance guard and next day it laid down a barrage to help 12th Battalion North Staffordshire Regiment establish a bridgehead on the Lys. After a quiet period, Second Army launched the Fifth Battle of Ypres on 28 September. 66th Divisional Artillery was not initially involved, but the day before CCCXXXI Bde fired a creeping barrage to support 23rd Battalion Lancashire Fusiliers in a small attack to straighten the line on the Lys. With the success of Second Army's attack further north, the Germans in front of 40th Division on the Lys began to withdraw, and from 3 October CCCXXXI Bde was put under the tactical command of 120th Infantry Bde as it formed the advance guard. However, the German retirement was so rapid that the brigade had little to do except reconnoitre new positions across the Lys, which it crossed on 5 October. The Germans took up positions beyond Armentières and the brigade operated from south of the town, carrying out harassing fire and covering raids. The advance was resumed on 15 October, CCCXXXI Bde once again supporting the advance guard, moving by way of La Houlette (17 October), Wambrechies (18 October) and Erquinghem, where 66th DA was relieved by 40th DA.

66th Divisional Artillery moved south by train to join Fourth Army and went back into the line on 27 October to support 25th Division of XIII Corps for the Battle of the Sambre. On 2 November CCCXXXI Bde pushed a section from each battery up close to the line at Bousies, the rest of the guns and HQ following next day. Zero hour for 25th Division was 06.15 on 4 November, and the brigade fired a creeping barrage lasting 5 hours 20 minutes as the infantry attacked between Fontaine-au-Bois and Happegarbes. The barrage initially advanced slowly, which was an advantage given the heavy mist disrupting the crossing of the Sambre–Oise Canal, but the Germans were driven off by the barrage and left a number of bridges undestroyed. These were rushed by 75th Infantry Bde, and the Sappers began work on other crossings. The barrage began moving forward again at 10.33 and by 11.15 the brigade had secured Fourth Army's objective for the day. The infantry had worked further forward by 19.30, and CCCXXXI re-arranged the night SOS barrage lines accordingly.

By now 66th (2nd EL) Division had been reformed as a fighting division and had fought at the battles of Cambrai and the Selle in XIII Corps, covered by the artillery of other formations. It now came up from reserve and took up the advance. On 5 November A and C Btys of CCCXXXI Bde, each with a howitzer section from D Bty, crossed the canal at Landrecies to provide close support to 198th (East Lancashire) and 199th (Manchester) Infantry Bdes respectively as they followed the retreating Germans. The rest of CCCXXXI Bde moved up over the next two days. On 9 November Fourth Army formed a pursuit force under the commander of 66th (2nd EL) Division, Major-General Keppel Bethell. 'Bethell's Force' comprised 5th Cavalry Bde and the South African Bde, with A, B and two sections of D (H) Btys from CCCXXXI Bde under Lt-Col Adams, together with Royal Air Force (RAF) squadrons, armoured cars, anti-aircraft guns, cyclists, machine gunners, engineers and pioneers, and support services. While Bethell's force continued pursuing the beaten Germans, the remainder of Fourth Army halted to ease its supply problems. The rest of CCCXXXI Bde supported 199th Bde around Avesnes. On 10 November Bethell's Force picked its way forward with single field gun sections accompanying the South African advance guard. Cavalry patrols found the enemy deployed just beyond Hestrud. The South Africans attacked, coming under fire from artillery, machine guns and aircraft, but captured the high ground, while the RAF attacked the retreating German transport column. Following, CCCXXXI Bde HQ moved up to Solre-le-Château, where the Germans had abandoned its ammunition trains and dumps. That night the Germans shelled the station, attempting to destroy the ammunition. Early next morning, 11 November, 199th Bde sent forward two battalions, each with two 18-pdrs, to drive off the enemy's screens. Hostilities ended at 11.00 that day when the Armistice with Germany came into force.

Having led the pursuit, 66th (2nd EL) Division was initially selected to form part of the Army of Occupation, and began its march to the Rhine on 18 November. However, the march was halted on 1 December, when CCCXXXI Bde had reached Philippeville in Belgium. On 14 December the division went into winter quarters around Ciney while other formations went to form British Army of the Rhine. CCCXXXI Brigade remained billeted at Havelange while demobilisation began. This process was completed on 4 May 1919 when the brigade was disbanded.

== Interwar ==
When the TF was reconstituted on 7 February 1920, II East Lancs Bde reformed at Manchester with 17 to 20 Lancashire Btys. In 1921 the TF was reorganised as the Territorial Army (TA) and the unit was redesignated as 52nd (Manchester) Brigade, RFA, with the following organisation:

- Brigade HQ at Hyde Road, Ardwick, Manchester
- 205, 206, 207 (East Lancashire) Btys
- 208 (East Lancashire) Bty (Howitzer)

The brigade was once again part of 42nd (EL) Divisional Artillery. In 1924 the RFA was subsumed into the Royal Artillery (RA), and the word 'Field' was inserted into the titles of its brigades and batteries. The establishment of a TA divisional artillery brigade was four 6-gun batteries, three equipped with 18-pounders and one with 4.5-inch howitzers, all of World War I patterns. However, the batteries only held four guns in peacetime. The guns and their first-line ammunition wagons were still horsedrawn and the battery staffs were mounted. Partial mechanisation was carried out from 1927, but the guns retained iron-tyred wheels until pneumatic tyres began to be introduced just before World War II.

In 1938 the RA modernised its nomenclature and a lieutenant-colonel's command was designated a 'regiment' rather than a 'brigade'; this applied to TA field brigades from 1 November 1938. The TA was doubled in size after the Munich Crisis, and most regiments formed duplicates. Part of the reorganisation was that field regiments changed from four six-gun batteries to an establishment of two batteries, each of three four-gun troops. For the Manchester Artillery this resulted in the following organisation from 25 May 1939:

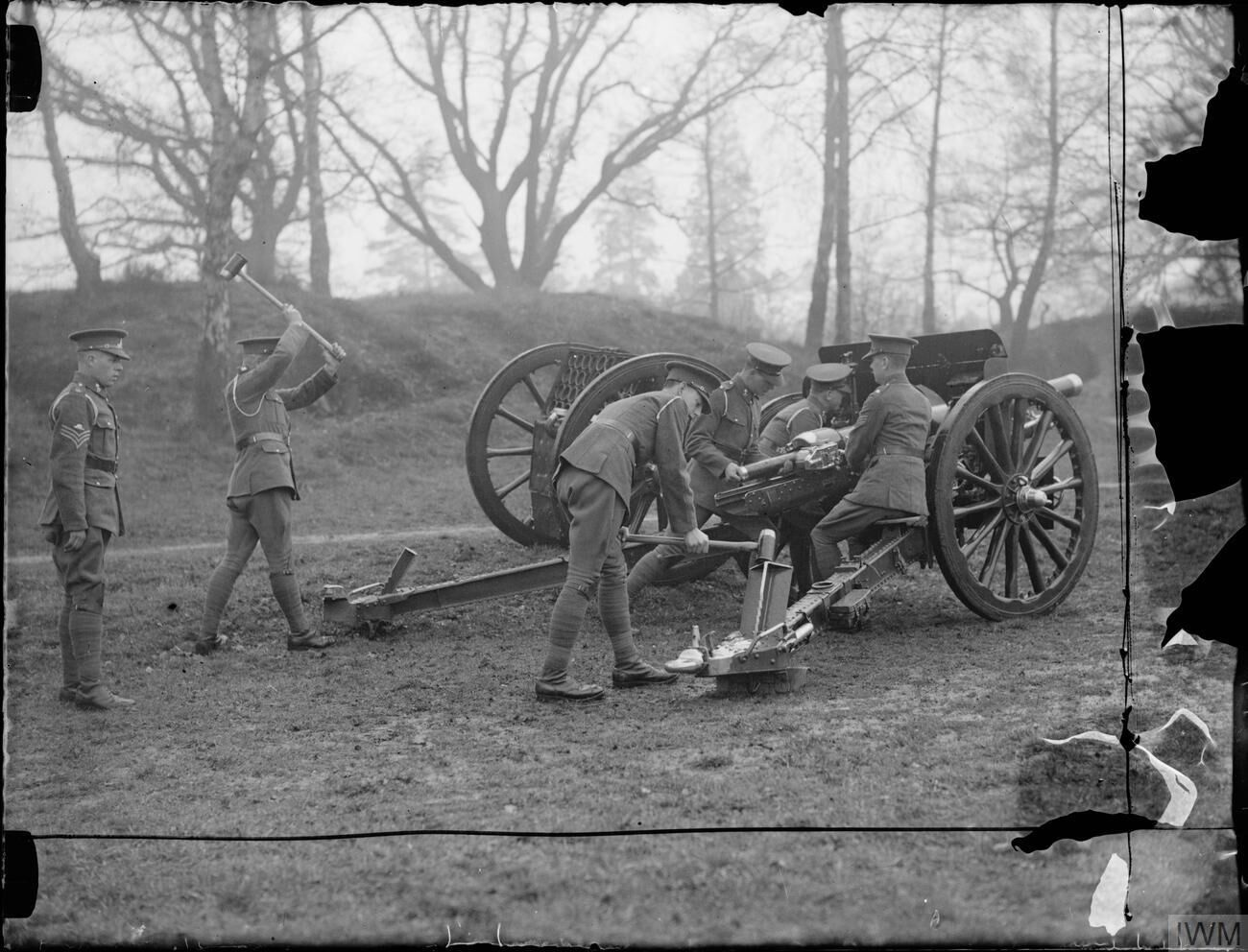
Emplacing an 18-pounder with wooden wheels at the start of World War II

52nd (Manchester) Field Regiment

- Regimental Headquarters (RHQ) at Hyde Road, Manchester
- 205 (East Lancashire) Field Bty
- 206 (East Lancashire) Field Bty

110th Field Regiment

- RHQ at Gorton
- 207 (East Lancashire) Field Bty
- 208 (East Lancashire) Field Bty

The Manchester Artillery mobilised on 1 September 1939, just before the outbreak of war, as part of 42nd (EL) Infantry Division, but from 27 September the newly-formed 66th Infantry Division took over the duplicate units including 110th Fd Rgt.

== World War II ==
=== 52nd (Manchester) Field Regiment ===
==== Battle of France ====
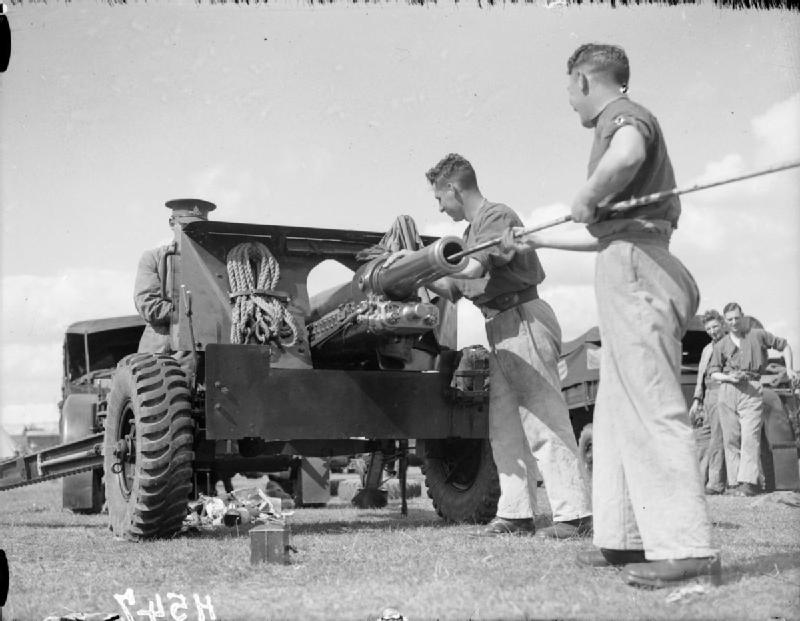
Gunners sponging out an 18/25-pounder Mk V P during exercises near Basingstoke, 1939.

On the outbreak of war 52nd Fd Rgt was still equipped with 18-pdrs and 4.5-inch howitzers, but by the time 42nd (EL) Division began crossing to France to join the British Expeditionary Force (BEF) in April it was fully equipped with 18/25-pounders. When the German offensive began on 10 May, the BEF advanced into Belgium under Plan D, and by 15 May its leading divisions were in place on the River Dyle. 42nd (EL) Division moved up to reserve positions on the River Escaut in France. But the Wehrmacht's breakthrough in the Ardennes threatened the BEF's flank, and it had to retreat again. 52nd Field Rgt was deployed in emergency anti-tank (A/T) positions along the River Scarpe. As the Germans thrust behind the BEF, by 26 May RHQ of 52nd Fd Rgt was controlling a group consisting of 206 Bty and 2nd Regiment, Royal Horse Artillery and was falling back to Mont des Cats; 205 Bty was detached to 2nd Division. On that day the decision was made to evacuate the BEF through Dunkirk (Operation Dynamo), but RHQ and 206 Bty took part in a rearguard action on Mont des Cats with the artillery and engineers of 44th (Home Counties) Division. 42nd Divisional Artillery was evacuated on 30 May, but 205 Bty was still fighting with 2nd Division and did not get away until 2 June.

Units returning from France were rapidly reinforced, re-equipped with whatever was available, and deployed for home defence. Field regiments were reorganised into three batteries, and 52nd Fd Rgt accordingly formed 437 Fd Bty by 29 March 1941. In the autumn of 1941 it was decided to convert 42nd (EL) Division into an armoured division. 52nd (Manchester) and 53rd (Bolton) Fd Rgts left on 20 October, and joined 76th Infantry Division defending Norfolk. During 1942 large reinforcements were sent from the UK to Middle East Forces, and 52nd Fd Rgt was chosen to join them. It left 76th Division on 23 August 1942.

==== Middle East ====
The regiment landed in Egypt and moved on to Iraq, arriving on 18 January 1943, when it came under the command of 8th Indian Division (along with 53rd (Bolton) Fd Rgt). The division was in Paiforce defending the vital oilfields of Iraq and Persia and the line of communications with the Soviet Union. By the spring of 1943 the victories in North Africa and on the Eastern Front had removed the threat to the oilfields, and troops could be released from Paiforce. 8th Indian Division moved to Syria and was then selected for the forthcoming Italian Campaign.

==== Italy ====
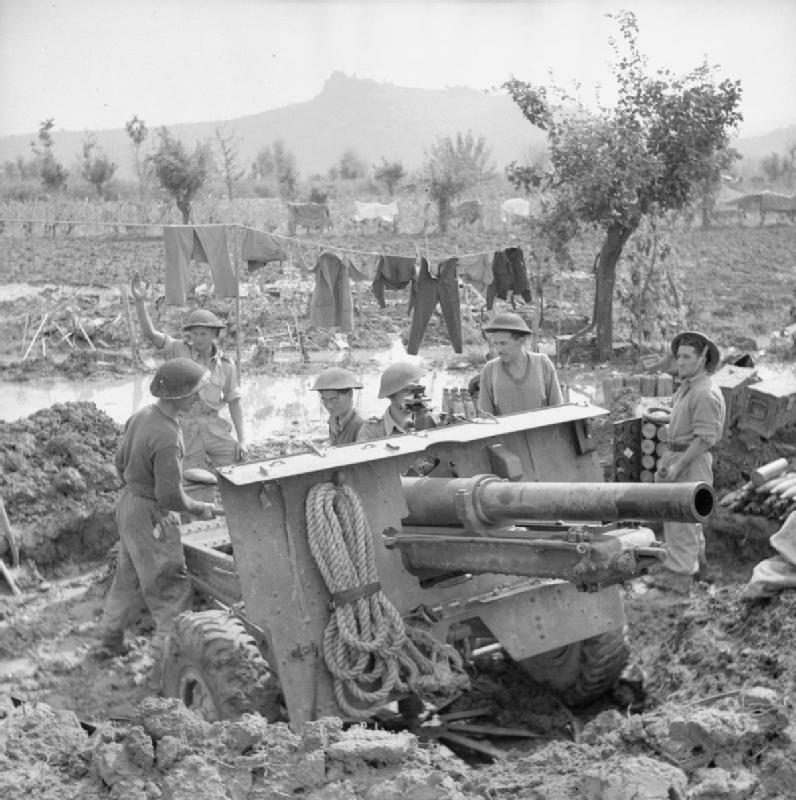
A 25-pounder crew in a waterlogged position in Italy, 1944.

Landing in Italy in September, the division joined Eight Army's advance up the east coast of Italy, attacking across the River Trigno (1–4 November) where a German counter-attack 'was blown to pieces by the divisional artillery'. 8th Indian Division then captured Mozzagrogna in the Bernhardt Line. It continued advancig with short, powerfully supported attacks against stubborn resistance, where artillery ammunition supply became the limiting factor, until winter weather brought an end to operations.

In May 1944 the division made an assault crossing of the Rapido in Operation Diadem) with a massive artillery programme. The Germans retired to the Hitler Line, but once the guns were brought up they totally suppressed the German artillery. While the armoured divisions advanced up the roads, the lightly-equipped 8th Indian Division took to the narrow tracks through the hills, driving German rearguards from the hilltop towns.

For the attack on the Gothic Line (Operation Olive, 8th Indian Division crossed the River Arno on 21 August, and then advanced into the roadless mountains before opening the routes into the Lamone Valley. The gunners had particular problems in firing over crests to hit targets behind, and artillery ammunition also had to be rationed from November. On 26 December the Germans launched a counter-attack (the Battle of Garfagnana) but 8th Indian Division had already been rushed to bolster the US sector concerned and the German attack was not pressed.

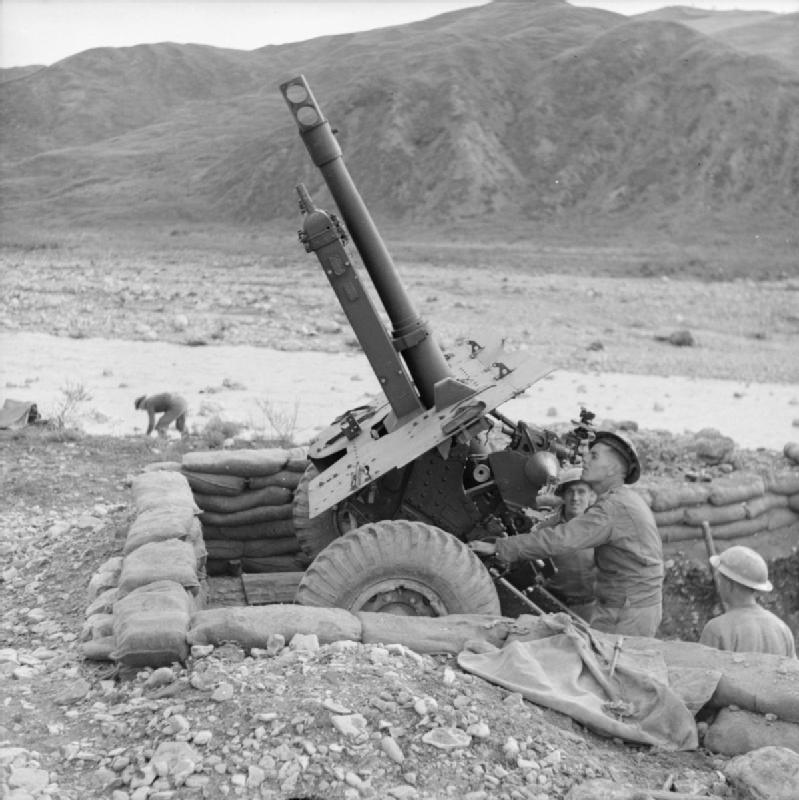
A 25-pounder in a gun pit adapted to gain maximum elevation, Italy 1944.

In the Allies' spring 1945 offensive, Operation Grapeshot, 8th Indian Division was given the task of an assault crossing of the River Senio, with massive artillery support added to its own guns, and ample ammunition stocks built up during the winter. It then secured crossings over the River Santerno, and cby utting round Ferrara it was the first formation of Eighth Army to reach the River Po on 23 April. German resistance was crumbling and there was little opposition to its crossing on the night of 25/26 April.

Hostilities on the Italian Front ended on 2 May with the Surrender of Caserta, but 8th Indian Division had already been withdrawn from the line as the first Indian formation to transfer to the Far East to fight the Japanese. 52nd (Manchester) Fd Rgt embarked for the UK on 27 July and passed into suspended animation on 3 November 1945.

=== 110th (Manchester) Field Regiment ===
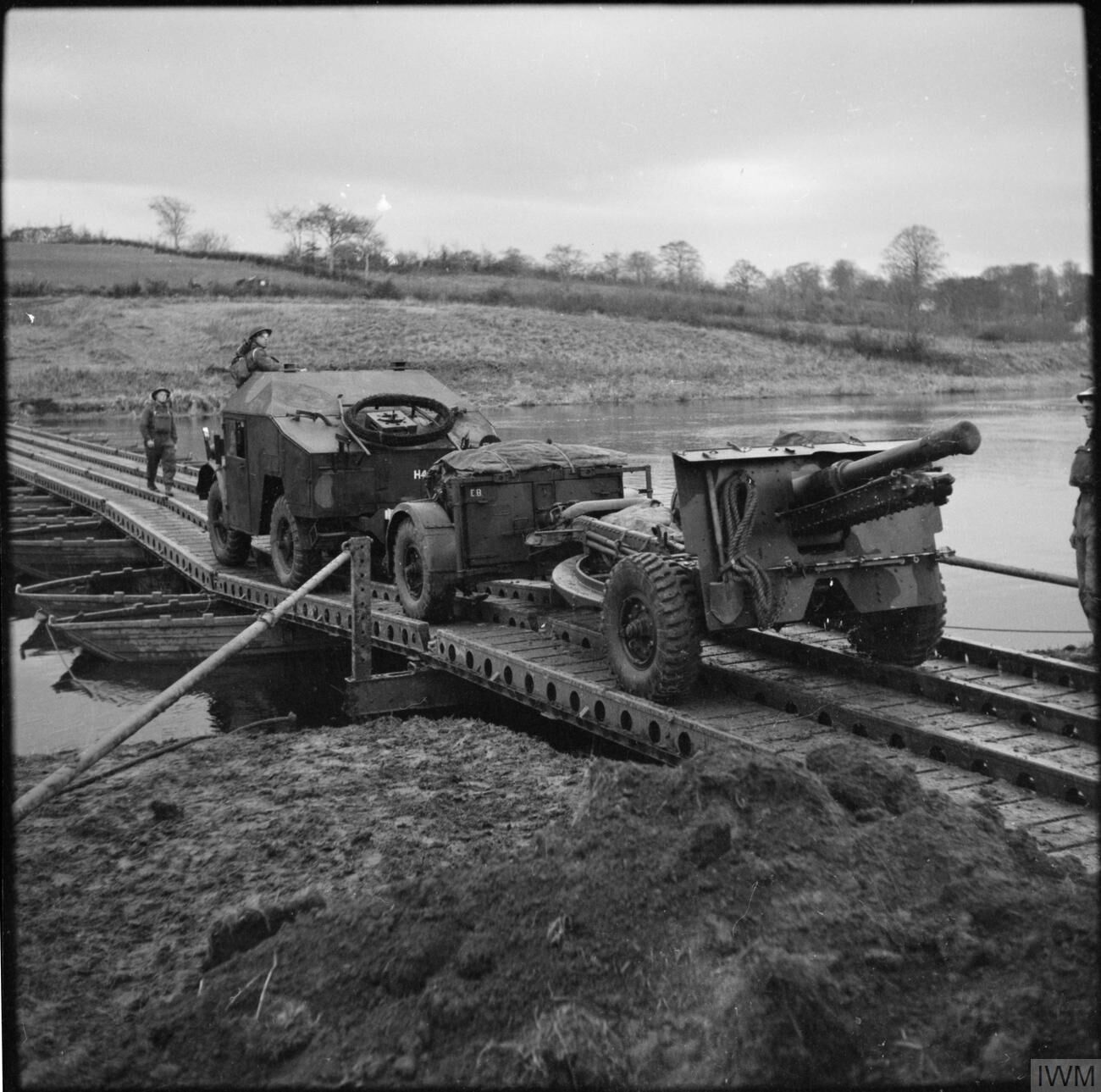
Quad tractor towing a 25-pdr and limber over a pontoon bridge during exercises in Northern Ireland

==== Home defence ====
After the BEF was evacuated from Dunkirk, Home Forces underwent a reorganisation to meet a potential German invasion. As part of this, 66th Division was disbanded on 23 June 1940. On 10 July 110th Fd Rgt joined 59th (Staffordshire) Infantry Division, formerly as a motor division, which was reorganising as a conventional infantry division and required a third field regiment. At the time the division was in X Corps in North East England. 110th Field Rgt formed its third battery, 475 Fd Bty, on 26 January 1941 while the regiment was stationed at Catterick. The division transferred to IX Corps, still in NE England, on 9 April, then to III Corps in Western Command on 10 November. On 17 February 1942 110th Fd Rgt was authorised to use its parent unit's 'Manchester' subtitle. On 1 June 59th (S) Division was sent to Northern Ireland to continue its training, remaining there until 19 March 1943.

The division then moved back to England to join XII Corps in 21st Army Group, training for the Allied invasion of Normandy (Operation Overlord).

==== Normandy ====
59th (Staffordshire) Division was not engaged on D-Day itself, but as a follow-up formation it crossed to Normandy between 21 and 27 June 1944. It joined I Corps and went into the line to support 3rd Canadian Division's attack on Carpiquet airfield (Operation Windsor) on 4–5 July. The division then attacked Caen from the north in Operation Charnwood beginning on 8 July. For this operation the divisional artillery was reinforced by a considerable amount of corps artillery, by naval gunfire and by the heavy bombers of RAF Bomber Command. After this preparation the artillery fired a barrage in front of the attacking infantry, who moved forward at 04.20; 59th (S) Division was on its first objectives within an hour. After further preparation by fighter-bombers of RAF Second Tactical Air Force and medium bombers of Ninth US Air Force, 59th (S) Division pushed fresh troops through at 07.30 towards their second objectives. This time there was more opposition: the division kept up the pressure all day and by nightfall had taken the village of Saint-Contest and what remained on Bijude after the bombardment, but the other objectives still held out. Next mourning the division worked its way steadily forward and secured these objective by midday. By now the flanking divisions were closing in on the city centre and the German defenders withdrew across the River Orne.

59th (S) Division was now switched to XXX Corps west of Caen. As a preliminary to Operation Goodwood, an armoured thrust east of Caen, XXX Corps fought continuously from 15 to 18 July, attacking in the Noyers-Bocage area and fighting off repeated enemy counter-attacks (the Second Battle of the Odon). 59th (S) Division captured Haut des Forges, but Noyers held out against successive attacks. However, the battle was successful in pinning several Panzer divisions west of the Goodwood battlefield.

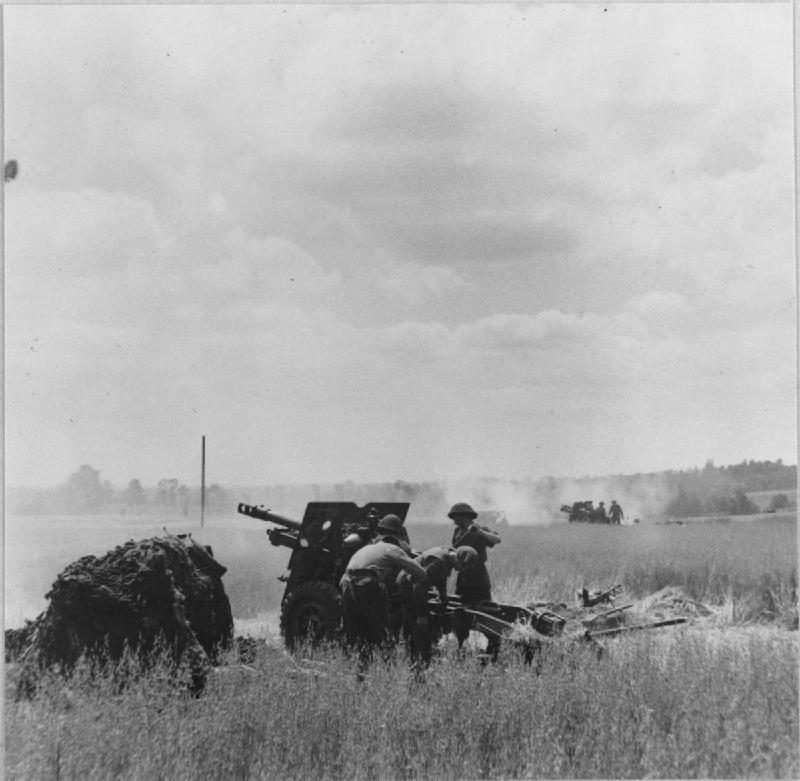
25-pounders in action in Normandy, June 1944.

59th (S) Division now reverted to XII Corps. By the end of July the Allied breakout from the Normandy beachhead was under way and the German forces in front of XII Corps began to withdraw on the night of 3 August. 59th (S) Division followed up closely and reached the Orne by nightfall on 4 August. During the night of 6/7 August the division's infantry waded across the river, but the artillery had to wait for the sappers to build bridges before it could cross the deep and narrow valley. The following evening the bridgehead came under heavy attack, but the infantry and artillery broke up all the attacks and the bridgehead was firmly held. By now XXX Corps had captured the dominating Mont Pinçon in Operation Bluecoat and First Canadian Army was beginning Operation Totalize to break through to Falaise. XII Corps followed up, but as the Falaise pocket began to shrink, 59th (S) Division was squeezed out of the line by 18 August.

The War Office had realised even before D-Day that the army's manpower situation was so bad that some formations in 21st Army Group would have to be disbanded sooner or later. At the end of August 1944 59th (Staffordshire) was selected, as the junior infantry division, to be broken up to provide reinforcements for other formations. However, the divisional Headquarters, Royal Artillery, (HQRA) and its field artillery regiments were converted into an independent Army Group Royal Artillery (AGRA) attached directly to Second Army under the designation 59 AGRA.

==== Low Countries ====
On 8 September 1944, 59 AGRA set up its HQ at Louviers in Normandy. In early October, it moved up to 'The Island', near Nijmegen, supporting the US 101st Airborne Division. Then, on 15 October it was in action in the Hoogboom area with its units under command of 2nd and 3rd Canadian Divisions. On 20 October, 59 AGRA was supporting 4th Canadian Armoured Division and 2nd Canadian Division, but able to support 49th (West Riding) Division if its guns were not otherwise engaged. For most of November, with only 61st (North Midland) and 110th (Manchester) Fd Rgts under command, 59 AGRA was not given any targets.

Then on 30 November HQ 59 AGRA was informed that due to the acute shortage of infantry replacements, the formation was soon to be disbanded. Its last task was to fire in support of Operation Guildford on 3 December. This was an attack by 15th (Scottish) Infantry Division to take the Germans' last bridgehead west of the River Maas, at Blerick, opposite Venlo. It was a textbook operation, employing 21st Army Group's superior resources in airpower, engineering and artillery to overcome formidable minefields, anti-tank ditches and fortifications with low casualties. 59 AGRA was one of three AGRAs devoted to supporting the attack by a single infantry brigade (44th (Lowland) Bde), which was a complete success.

The following day 59 AGRA moved to the Zwevegem area, and disbandment began, with the first drafts of gunners transferring to the infantry in the UK. 110th (Manchester) Field Rgt passed into suspended animation on 31 January 1945.

== Postwar ==
The TA was reconstituted on 1 January 1947, when 52nd Fd Rgt was reformed as 252 (Manchester) Fd Rgt in 42nd (Lancashire) Division.

At the same time 110th (Manchester) Fd Rgt was reformed as 310 (Manchester) Heavy Anti-Aircraft Rgt in 94 (AA) AGRA. However, 94 AGRA was disbanded in September 1948, when the regiment was probably taken over by Anti-Aircraft Command. On 1 January 1954 the regiment merged with 634 (8th Lancashire Fusiliers) HAA Rgt, which had been created from a longstanding TA infantry battalion in 1947. The merged regiment became 310 (8th Lancashire Fusiliers) HAA Rgt, but AA Command was abolished on 10 March 1955 and there were wholesale amalgamations among its regiments. 310 HAA Regiment was amalgamated with 360, 465, 574 and 606 Rgts to form a new 314 HAA Rgt, with P (Manchester) Bty.

A reduction in the TA on 1 May 1961 saw 252 (Manchester) Fd Rgt absorb RHQ, P (Manchester) and R (Stockport) Btys of 314 HAA Rgt. The TA was further reduced into the Territorial and Army Volunteer Reserve (TAVR) on 1967, when the regiment formed Battery HQ and D & E Trps of 209 Light Air Defence Bty (The Manchester Artillery) in 103 (Lancashire Artillery Volunteers) Light AD Rgt. This battery continues in today's Army Reserve, based at Belle Vue Army Reserve Centre in Manchester.

== Honorary Colonels ==
The following former COs served as Honorary Colonel of the unit:

- Lt-Col John Isaac Mawson, appointed 4 February 1870
- Lt-Col Sir Thomas Sowler, appointed 8 May 1886
- Col Ralph Peacock, VD, appointed 10 October 1891
- Col Robert Birley, CB, VD, appointed 25 March 1909
- Col Harry Sowler, TD, appointed 9 September 1920, still holding the position on the outbreak of World War II

== Memorial ==
The Manchester Artillery Memorial consists of three marble panels containing 106 names from World War I and 64 from World War II. Originally at the Manchester Artillery Drill Hall in Hyde Road, Ardwick, it was later moved to the Army Reserve Centre at Belle Vue Street, Gorton, HQ of 209 (Manchester) Bty, 103 (Lancashire Artillery Volunteers) Rgt.
