= Hargicourt–Pierrepont station =

French railway station

Hargicourt–Pierrepont
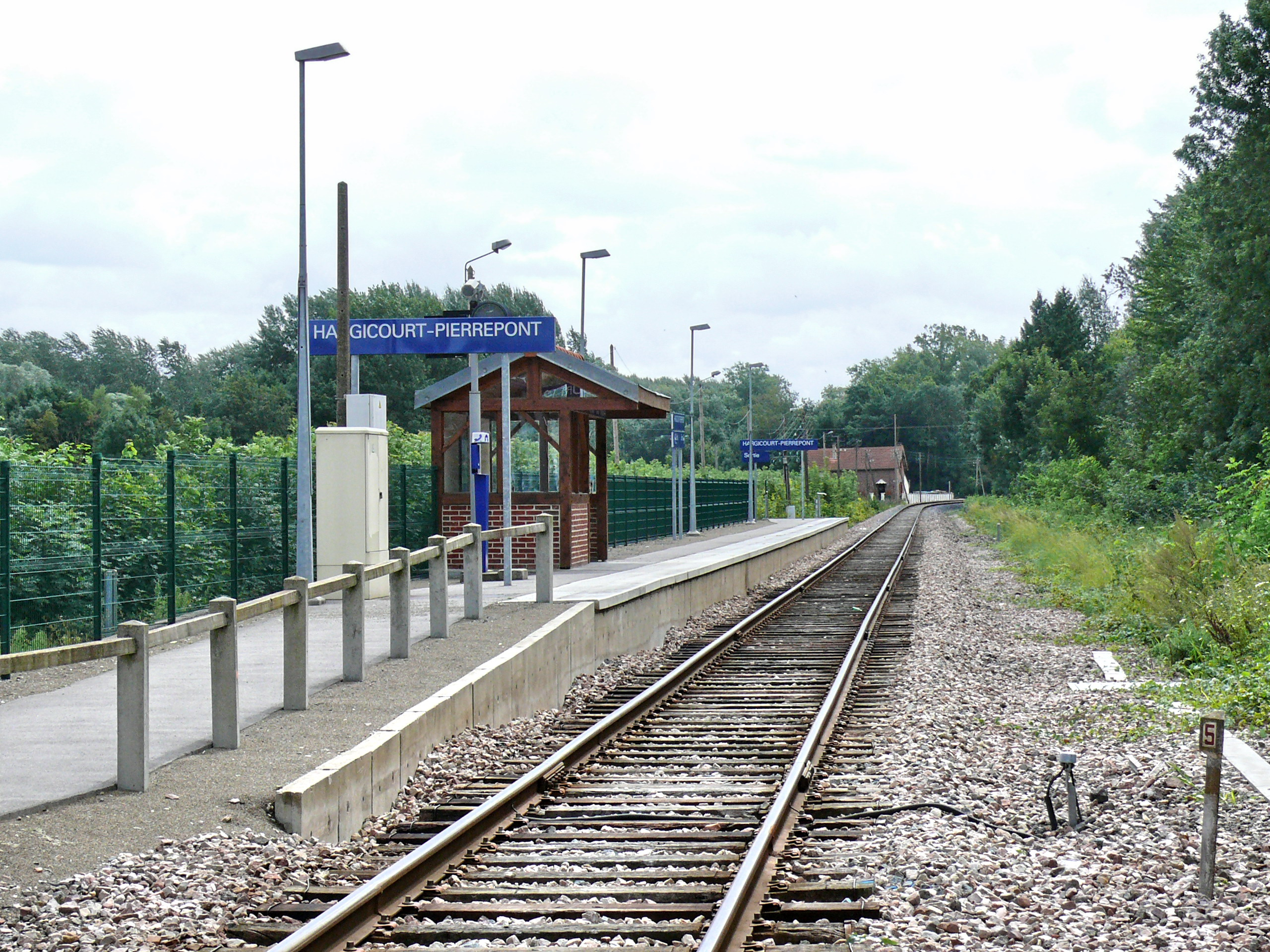

General information
- Location: Rue de la Gare, Hargicourt; 80500 Trois-Rivières; Somme, France
- Coordinates: 49°42′51″N 2°31′53″E
- Owner: SNCF
- Operator: SNCF
- Line: Amiens–Compiègne
- Platforms: 1
- Tracks: 1

Construction
- Accessible: yes

Other information
- Station code: 87313338

History
- Opened: 1883

Services
Preceding station	TER Hauts-de-France	Following station
Moreuil towards Amiens	Proxi P23	Montdidier towards Compiègne
Location

Hargicourt–Pierrepont station (French: Gare de Hargicourt–Pierrepont) is a railway station located in the commune of Trois-Rivières, near the villages Hargicourt and Pierrepont-sur-Avre, in the Somme department, France. The station is served by TER Hauts-de-France trains (Amiens-Compiègne line).

== The station ==
The station is now an unstaffed halt. In 2003 the station was moved 200 m south as part of renovations to make it accessible to the handicapped, and the former station building was closed.

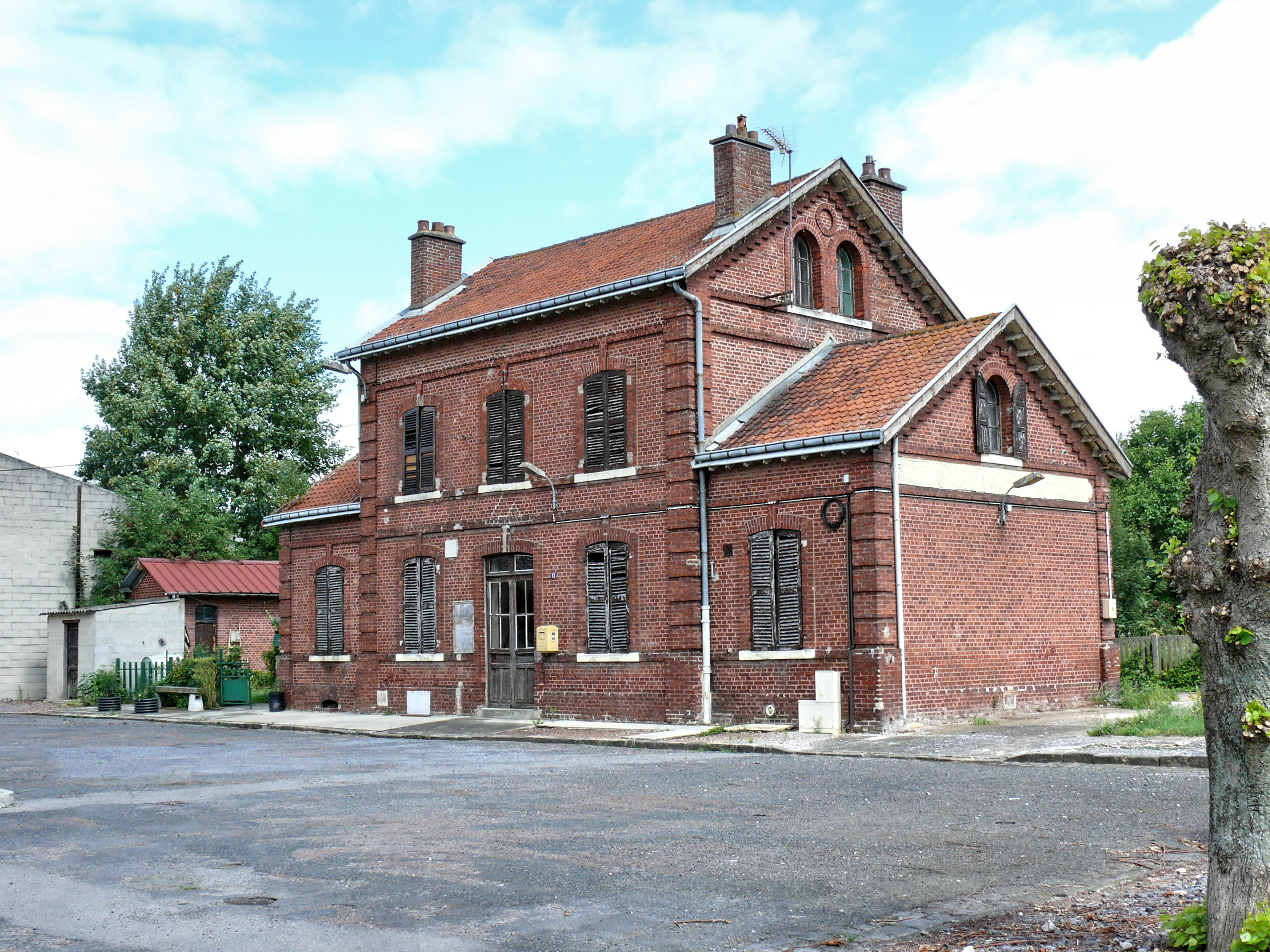
Former station building, now closed

== See also ==
- List of SNCF stations in Hauts-de-France
