= Arthur Moore Lascelles =

English recipient of the Victoria Cross

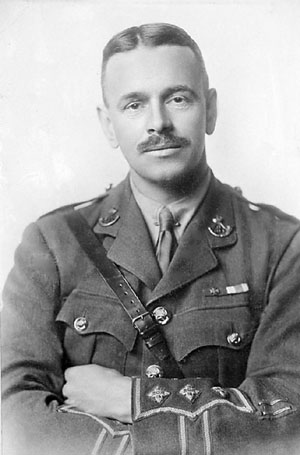
- Born: 12 October 1880; Streatham, London
- Died: 7 November 1918 (aged 38); Fontaine-au-Bois, France
- Burial place: Dourlers Communal Cemetery Extension
- Military career
- Allegiance: South Africa; United Kingdom
- Branch: South African Army; British Army
- Service years: 1902–1915 (South Africa), 1915–1918 (UK)
- Rank: Quartermaster Sergeant (South Africa); Captain (UK)
- Units: The Durham Light Infantry
- Conflicts: World War I: Western Front; Battle of Cambrai (WIA); Hundred Days Offensive †
- Awards: Victoria Cross; Military Cross

Arthur Moore Lascelles VC MC (12 October 1880 – 7 November 1918) was an English recipient of the Victoria Cross, the highest and most prestigious award for gallantry in the face of the enemy that can be awarded to British and Commonwealth forces. He was educated at Uppingham School and attended the University College of North Wales (now Bangor University) but abandoned his medical studies in 1902 and emigrated to South Africa.

== Details ==
He was 37 years old, and an acting captain in the 3rd Battalion, The Durham Light Infantry, British Army, attached to 14th Battalion during the First World War when the following deed took place for which he was awarded the VC.

On 3 December 1917 at Masnieres, France, during a very heavy bombardment Captain Lascelles, although wounded, continued to encourage his men and organize the defence until the attack was driven off. Shortly afterwards the enemy attacked again and captured the trench, taking several prisoners. Captain Lascelles at once jumped onto the parapet and followed by his 12 remaining men rushed across under very heavy machine-gun fire and drove over 60 of the enemy back. Later the enemy attacked again and captured the trench and Captain Lascelles, who later managed to escape in spite of having received two further wounds.

He was killed in action, Fontaine-au-Bois, France, on 7 November 1918.

== The medal ==
His Victoria Cross was displayed at the Durham Light Infantry Museum & Durham Art Gallery, Durham, England.

== Sources ==
- Gliddon, Gerald (2004) [2012]. VCs of the First World War: Cambrai 1917. The History Press. ISBN 978-0-75-247668-1.
- DLI Biography
