= Castel station =

Railway station in Somme, France

Castel station (abandoned)

General information
- Location: Moreuil
- Coordinates: 49°47′33″N 2°27′40″E
- Owner: RFF/SNCF
- Line: 2 routes
Location

Castel was a railway station located in the commune of Moreuil in the Somme department, France. The station was served by local trains on the line from Amiens to Compiègne. The station building was used until 1940, and trains do not stop at the station anymore since the 1980s.

== The station ==
The station was situated at km 8.325 of the Amiens-Montdidier-Creil (via Longueil Ste Marie) line opened in 1853 by Compagnie du Nord and the Amiens-Compiègne line via Estrées-Saint-Denis.

The station was closed in the 1980s, when the line from Longueil-Ste-Marie to Creil was closed, and the line Amiens-Compiègne was turned into single track.

== See also ==
- List of SNCF stations in Hauts-de-France
- Moreuil station
