= Moreuil =

- Commune
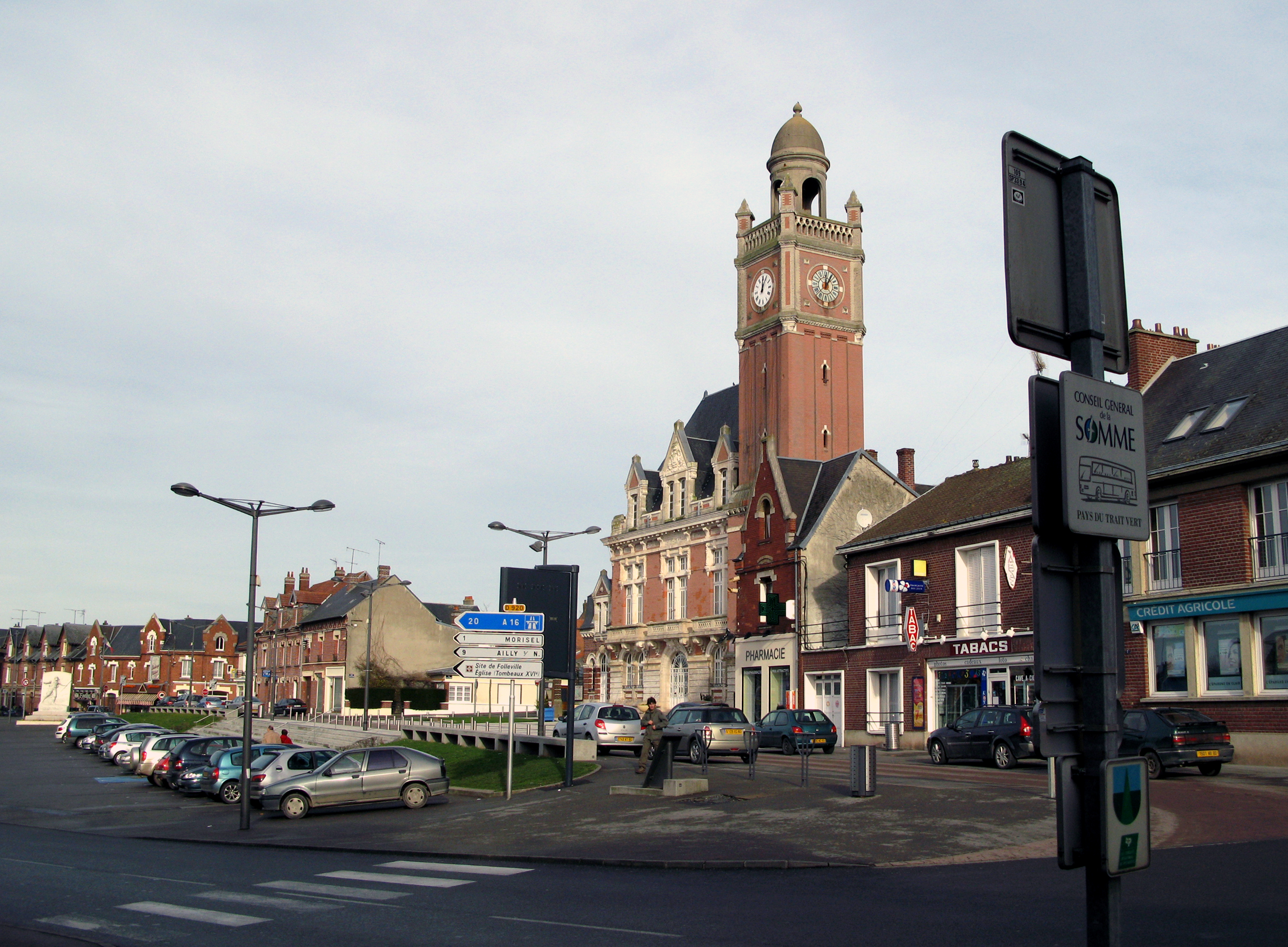
- The town hall square in Moreuil

- Coat of arms
- Location of Moreuil
- Location within France Location within Hauts-de-France
- Coordinates: 49°46′31″N 2°29′02″E
- Country: France
- Region: Hauts-de-France
- Department: Somme
- Arrondissement: Montdidier
- Canton: Moreuil
- Intercommunality: CC Avre Luce Noye

Government
  - Mayor (2020–2026): Dominique Lamotte
- Area^{1}: 23.43 km^{2} (9.05 sq mi)
- Elevation: 42 m (138 ft)
- Highest elevation: 113 m (371 ft)
- Lowest elevation: 32 m (105 ft)
- Population (2023): 3,936
  - Density: 168.0/km^{2} (435.1/sq mi)
- Time zone: UTC+01:00 (CET)
  - Summer (DST): UTC+02:00 (CEST)
- INSEE/Postal code: 80570 /80110
- ^{1} French Land Register data, which excludes lakes, ponds, glaciers > 1 km^{2} (0.386 sq mi or 247 acres) and river estuaries.

Moreuil (French pronunciation: [mɔʁœj]) is a commune in the Somme department in Hauts-de-France in northern France.

== Geography ==
Moreuil is situated on the D920 and D935 crossroads, some 13 miles (21 km) southeast of Amiens, on the banks of the river Avre. Moreuil station has rail connections to Amiens and Compiègne.

== Population ==
Historical population

| Year | Pop. | ±% p.a. |
|---|---|---|
| 1793 | 1,400 | — |
| 1836 | 2,051 | +0.89% |
| 1872 | 3,078 | +1.13% |
| 1906 | 2,915 | −0.16% |
| 1936 | 2,763 | −0.18% |
| 1962 | 3,609 | +1.03% |
| 1968 | 3,647 | +0.17% |
| 1975 | 4,099 | +1.68% |

| Year | Pop. | ±% p.a. |
|---|---|---|
| 1982 | 4,203 | +0.36% |
| 1990 | 4,156 | −0.14% |
| 1999 | 4,106 | −0.13% |
| 2007 | 3,988 | −0.36% |
| 2012 | 4,037 | +0.24% |
| 2017 | 3,980 | −0.28% |
| 2023 | 3,936 | −0.19% |

Source: EHESS and INSEE

== History ==
Known by several names over the years, Morolium (1103), Moroil (1183), Moruel, Moroilum, Moroiel, Moreul (1240), Moureul, Moureuil (1340), Morveul, Morvels and finally Moreuil, the commune has ancient origins. Flint tools have been found here and the presence of tall boundary stones indicates pre-Roman settlement. Moreuil comes from a Celtic word meaning ‘sea’. Moreuil is found on the Roman road that links Compiègne, Montdidier and Amiens which explains the number of Gallo-Roman finds in the vicinity.

First mentioned around 800 as a fort and square on the river Avre, it was sacked by the Normans. The lords of Moreuil rendered great service to the Kings of France during the Crusades. One was created a Knight of the Order of Malta. During the Hundred Years War, Moreuil suffered through blood and fire. It was taken, won back and re-taken by the Burgundians.

During the Wars of Religion, it was one of the strongest supporters of the Catholic League In 1574 the town's two schools were burnt down, but reconstructed thanks to the benefices of Cardinal Antoine de Créquy, Bishop of Amiens and abbot of Moreuil.

In 1720 hat-making was established in Moreuil. Unaffected to any degree by the French Revolution, Moreuil was subject to foreign occupation during 1815 and during the Franco-Prussian War of 1870. During World War I, the town formed a part of the front line of the Western Front.

== Places of interest ==
- Castel station
- The church
- The town hall
- The war memorial

== Personalities ==
- Jean Leclerc, 1587–1617, lawmaker and lawyer in Paris.

== See also ==
- Communes of the Somme department
- Raymond Couvègnes
