= Trois-Rivières, Somme =

Trois-Rivières
- Commune
- Location of Trois-Rivières
- Location within France Location within Hauts-de-France
- Coordinates: 49°42′47″N 2°32′35″E
- Country: France
- Region: Hauts-de-France
- Department: Somme
- Arrondissement: Montdidier
- Canton: Roye
- Intercommunality: CC Grand Roye

Government
  - Mayor (2020–2026): Joël Suin
- Area^{1}: 16.63 km^{2} (6.42 sq mi)
- Highest elevation: 115 m (377 ft)
- Lowest elevation: 40 m (130 ft)
- Population (2023): 1,482
  - Density: 89.12/km^{2} (230.8/sq mi)
- Time zone: UTC+01:00 (CET)
  - Summer (DST): UTC+02:00 (CEST)
- INSEE/Postal code: 80625 /80500
- ^{1} French Land Register data, which excludes lakes, ponds, glaciers > 1 km^{2} (0.386 sq mi or 247 acres) and river estuaries.

Trois-Rivières (French pronunciation: [tʁwɑ ʁivjɛʁ]; literally 'Three Rivers') is a commune in the Somme department in Hauts-de-France in northern France. It was established on 1 January 2019 by merger of the former communes of Pierrepont-sur-Avre (the seat), Contoire and Hargicourt. Hargicourt—Pierrepont station has rail connections to Amiens and Compiègne.

== See also ==
- Communes of the Somme department
