= Contoire =

- Part of Trois-Rivières
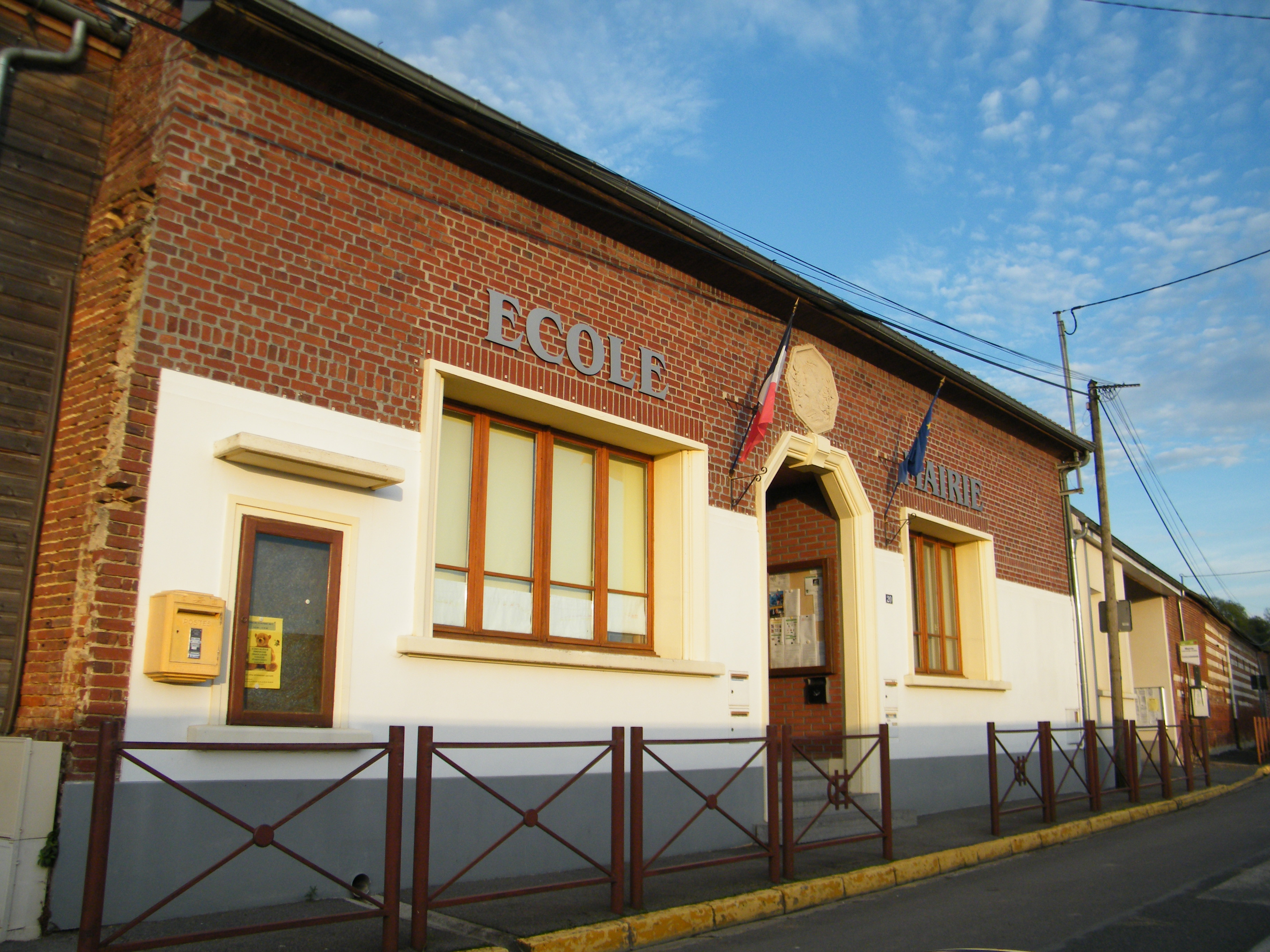
- The town hall and school in Contoire
- Location of Contoire
- Location within France Location within Hauts-de-France
- Coordinates: 49°43′19″N 2°33′28″E
- Country: France
- Region: Hauts-de-France
- Department: Somme
- Arrondissement: Montdidier
- Canton: Moreuil
- Commune: Trois-Rivières
- Area^{1}: 7.14 km^{2} (2.76 sq mi)
- Elevation: 57 m (187 ft)
- Highest elevation: 115 m (377 ft)
- Lowest elevation: 41 m (135 ft)
- Population (2019): 444
  - Density: 62.2/km^{2} (161/sq mi)
- Time zone: UTC+01:00 (CET)
  - Summer (DST): UTC+02:00 (CEST)
- Postal code: 80500
- ^{1} French Land Register data, which excludes lakes, ponds, glaciers > 1 km^{2} (0.386 sq mi or 247 acres) and river estuaries.

Contoire (French pronunciation: [kɔ̃twaʁ]) is a former commune in the Somme department in Hauts-de-France in northern France. On 1 January 2019, it was merged into the new commune Trois-Rivières.

== Geography ==
Contoire is situated at the junction of the D441 and D160, on the banks of the Avre, some 20 miles (32 km) southeast of Amiens.

== Population ==
Historical population
Year	Pop.	±% p.a.
1962	301	—
1968	286	−0.85%
1975	329	+2.02%
1982	345	+0.68%
1990	342	−0.11%
1999	340	−0.07%
2006	363	+0.94%
2019	444	+1.56%
Source: EHESS and INSEE

== See also ==
- Communes of the Somme department
