= Pierrepont-sur-Avre =

- Part of Trois-Rivières
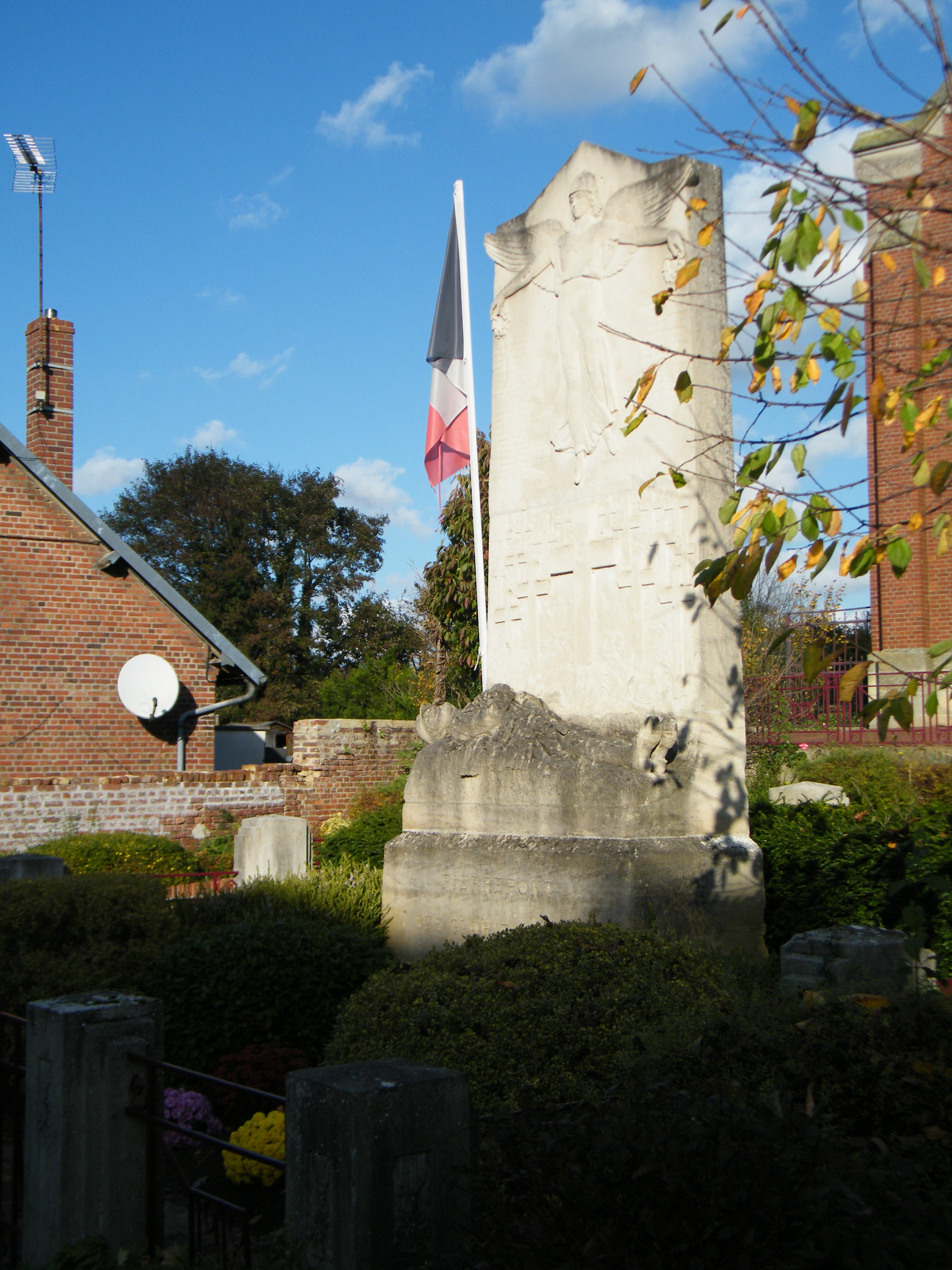
- The war memorial in Pierrepont-sur-Avre
- Location of Pierrepont-sur-Avre
- Location within France Location within Hauts-de-France
- Coordinates: 49°42′47″N 2°32′35″E
- Country: France
- Region: Hauts-de-France
- Department: Somme
- Arrondissement: Montdidier
- Canton: Moreuil
- Commune: Trois-Rivières
- Area^{1}: 4.3 km^{2} (1.7 sq mi)
- Elevation: 50 m (160 ft)
- Highest elevation: 110 m (360 ft)
- Lowest elevation: 42 m (138 ft)
- Population (2019): 666
  - Density: 150/km^{2} (400/sq mi)
- Time zone: UTC+01:00 (CET)
  - Summer (DST): UTC+02:00 (CEST)
- Postal code: 80500
- ^{1} French Land Register data, which excludes lakes, ponds, glaciers > 1 km^{2} (0.386 sq mi or 247 acres) and river estuaries.

Pierrepont-sur-Avre (French pronunciation: [pjɛʁpɔ̃ syʁ avʁ], literally Pierrepont on Avre) is a former commune in the Somme department in Hauts-de-France in northern France. On 1 January 2019, it was merged into the new commune Trois-Rivières.

== Geography ==
The commune is situated on the D935 road, some 20 miles (32 km) southeast of Amiens, on the banks of the river Avre.

== Population ==
Historical population
Year	Pop.	±% p.a.
1962	380	—
1968	386	+0.26%
1975	336	−1.96%
1982	374	+1.54%
1990	417	+1.37%
1999	475	+1.46%
2013	630	+2.04%
2019	666	+0.93%
Source: EHESS and INSEE

== See also ==
- Communes of the Somme department
