= Bousies =

- Commune
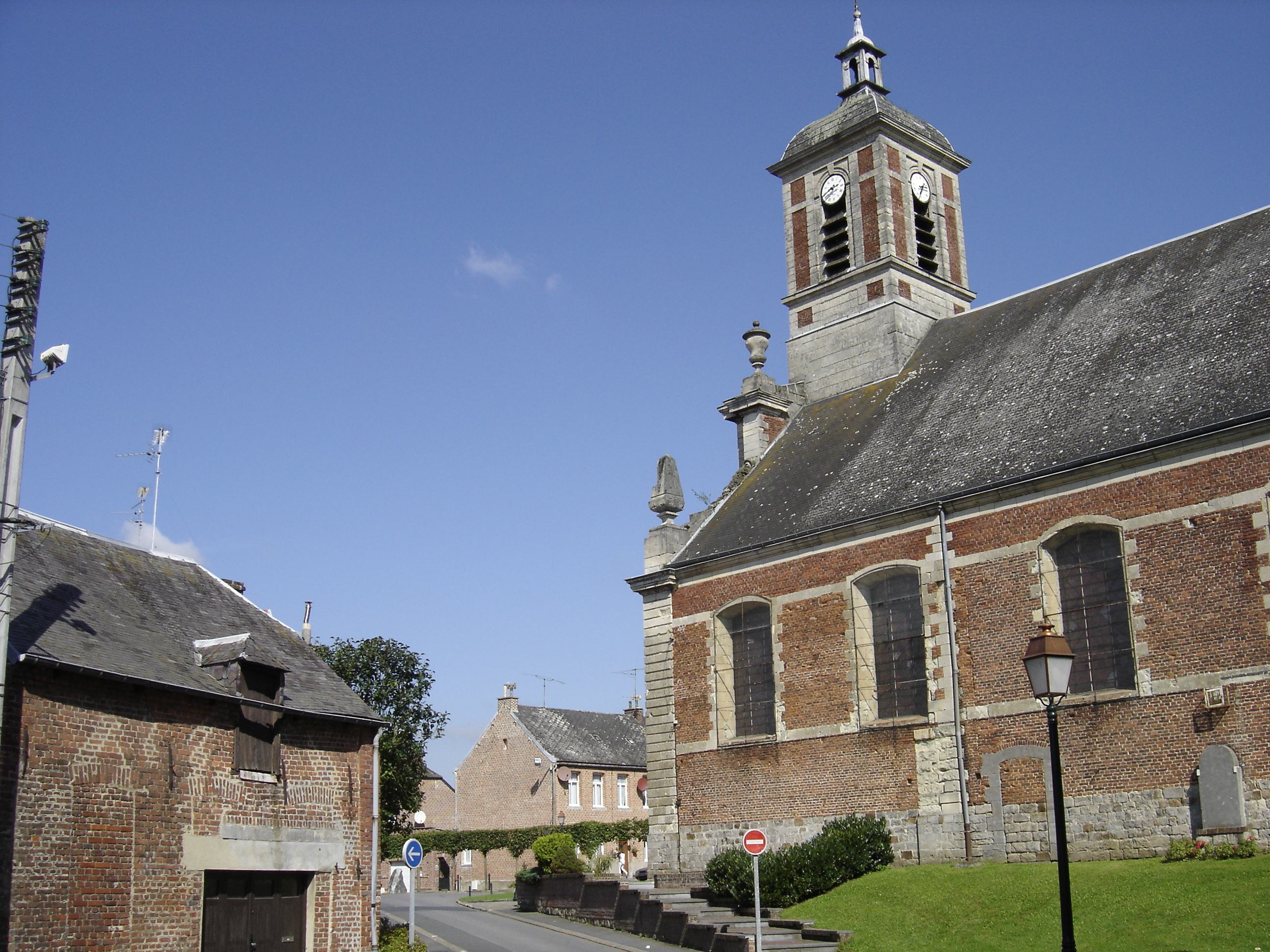
- The church in Bousies

- Coat of arms
- Location of Bousies
- Location within France Location within Hauts-de-France
- Coordinates: 50°09′06″N 3°36′59″E
- Country: France
- Region: Hauts-de-France
- Department: Nord
- Arrondissement: Avesnes-sur-Helpe
- Canton: Avesnes-sur-Helpe
- Intercommunality: Pays de Mormal

Government
  - Mayor (2020–2026): André Ducarne
- Area^{1}: 9.88 km^{2} (3.81 sq mi)
- Elevation: 137 m (449 ft)
- Highest elevation: 156 m (512 ft)
- Lowest elevation: 131 m (430 ft)
- Population (2023): 1,769
  - Density: 179/km^{2} (464/sq mi)
- Time zone: UTC+01:00 (CET)
  - Summer (DST): UTC+02:00 (CEST)
- INSEE/Postal code: 59099 /59222
- ^{1} French Land Register data, which excludes lakes, ponds, glaciers > 1 km^{2} (0.386 sq mi or 247 acres) and river estuaries.

Bousies (French pronunciation: [buzi]) is a commune in the Nord department in northern France.

== History ==
Bousies was part of County of Hainaut, an enclave in Cambrésis of which it was one of the 12 peerages. In 1007, Jean, Lord of Bousies, as peer of Cambrésis, pledged fidelity to bishop Herbin Ist, Count of Cambrai.

In 1095, the bishop Gaucher put the castle of Bousies under siege, and lord Wiband helped by a few locals resisted for 3 days before the castle was taken and later destroyed. Rebuilt, it was again taken in 1185 and in 1665. Later, it was purchased by French statesman Marshal Mortier to be used as a hunting place. Sadly, its inheritors sold it to wreckers who destroyed it for building materials. Joseph-Gaspard de Tascher, Napoleon III's Maternal Great-grandfather, was born in Bousies.

The family of Bousies became prominent in Scotland and can still be found in parts of Northern Ireland, but under the name of Bowsie after George Bousie changed the spelling in the 1800s because he didn't like the spelling of his surname. Another branch of the family emigrated to Belgium, in the Hainaut Province and later to Flanders, where they can still be found today.

== Population ==
Historical population
Year	Pop.	±% p.a.
1968	1,895	—
1975	1,814	−0.62%
1982	1,723	−0.73%
1990	1,717	−0.04%
1999	1,683	−0.22%
2007	1,678	−0.04%
2012	1,710	+0.38%
2017	1,738	+0.33%
2023	1,769	+0.30%
Source: INSEE

== Heraldry ==
Arms of Bousies	The arms of Bousies are blazoned : Azure, a cross argent. (Bousies and Fontaine-au-Bois use the same arms.)

== International relations ==
Bousies is twinned with:

- Risum-Lindholm, Germany

== Sights ==
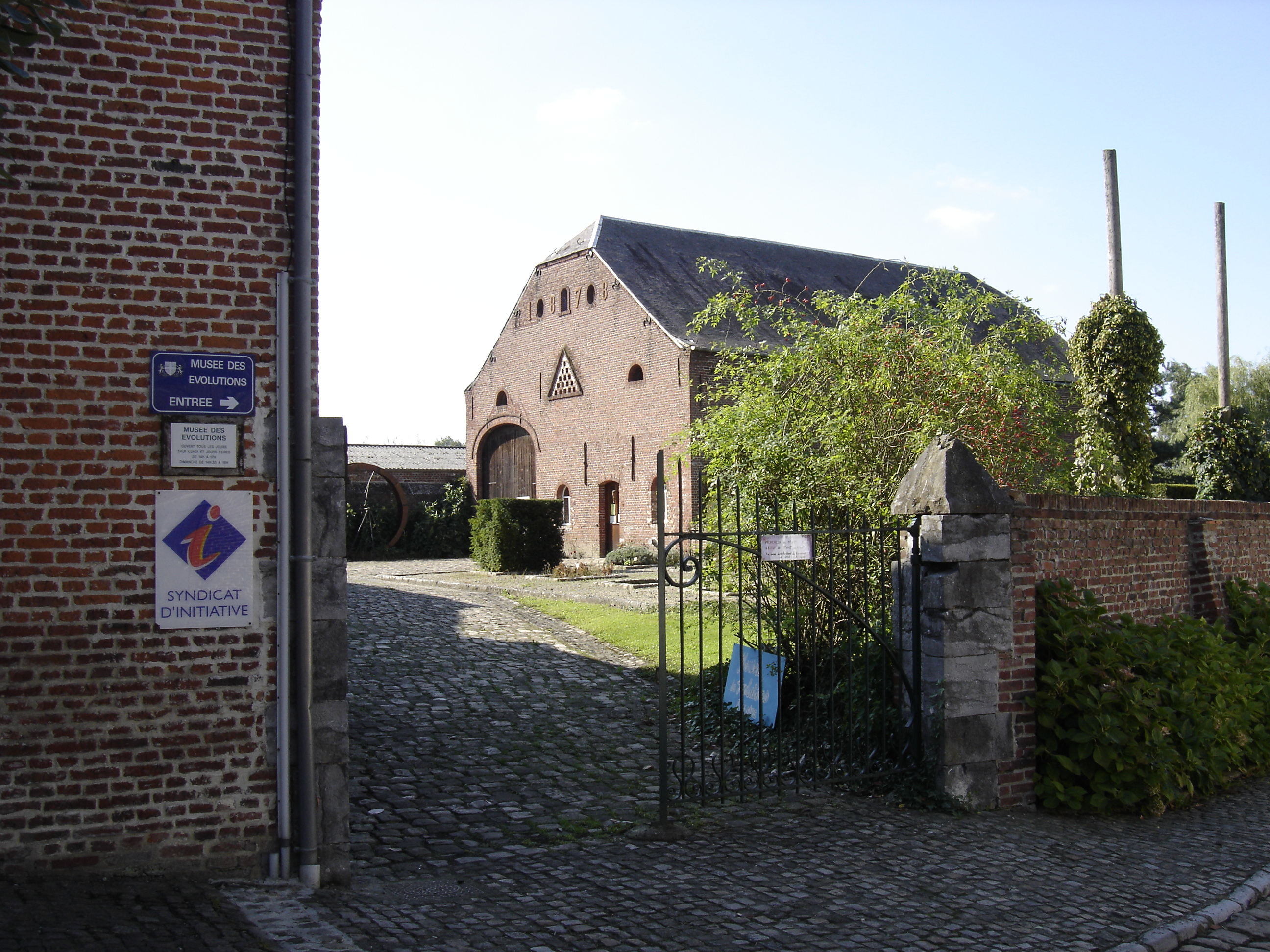
Museum of the Evolutions

- Museum of the Evolutions (Musée des Évolutions de Bousies) – near the center of the village, the museum was opened by Jean Vaillant, its curator, in 1993; it is a located in a building from 1576 which was preserved from destruction and restored; the museum presents a travel through history, from the prehistoric ages to our days, exploring the history of the region of Bousies. The visitor can follow the evolution of technology and communication means : from prehistoric artifacts and tools to the first electronic appliances through a huge inventory of ancient tools and objects. There is also a gallery dedicated to local medieval history as well as the reconstitution of a classroom at the beginning of the 20th century. The museum is located in a remarkable building, a 16th-century farm which features vaulted brick stables and an adjacent 19th-century barn. The barn houses a collection of agricultural machines and tools, as well an interesting dog wheel, a large wheel in which a dog was running to deliver power.
- Saint-Rémy church – built in 1736

== See also ==
- Communes of the Nord department
