= The Lancashire Steel Company =

British steel producer

The Lancashire Steel Company was a short-lived business operating from Manchester, England, in the 1860s. It was established to exploit the recent introduction of the Bessemer process for the manufacture of steel.

== Bessemer process in Lancashire ==
Lancashire, an English county, had a small iron industry prior to the invention and commercial exploitation of the Bessemer process. From the 1820s this was based solely in the Furness area, where three sites operated blast furnaces for the production of pig iron. Between the late 1850s and up until the 1880s the number and location of furnaces expanded considerably. The start of this growth roughly coincided with Bessemer providing practical proof of the usefulness of his process for the production of steel from pig iron. During this period there were 46 blast furnaces constructed around the county, many of which were outside the traditional centre of Furness.

Contiguous with the investment in the furnaces was an investment in the Bessemer conversion process itself, although this investment became uncommon beyond the mid-1870s. Several Lancashire businesses developed an interest in a short space of time, including the Barrow Hematite Steel Co. which started in 1864 and operated both furnaces and converters. Others included the old ironworks firm of Rushton and Eckersley, which installed converters around 1860 and was renamed as the Bolton Iron and Steel Co, and the Mersey Steel and Iron Co which installed then in 1865.

Most of the businesses of the area which took an early role in the process had existed as ironmakers and forgers prior to its introduction.

== Origins ==
Investors were sought in 1863 for a proposed new business, to be called The Lancashire Steel Company. It was intended ultimately to issue £150,000 in shares, the total being raised in stages over a period of two years. The company would develop a 10 acres (4.0 ha) site at Gorton, Manchester, with buildings, blast furnaces, steam hammers, rolling mills and other facilities necessary to produce steel using the relatively new Bessemer process. Royalties would be paid to Bessemer for the licensing of his method, but only on 95% of the production in order to allow for waste. The promoters intended that the company would initially produce 200 tons of steel per week in blocks weighing up to 10 tons each. It was planned that the output would eventually be expanded to include the manufacture of blocks weighing up to 20 tons and that by this stage the company would be in a position to supply the maritime market.

The proposed site was adjacent to the Manchester, Sheffield and Lincolnshire Railway (MS&LR), for ease of transport of both raw materials and finished goods. The initial development was expected to take 18 months to put in place.

The prospectus announced that some of the directors and promoters of the company would also be consumers of its output and that the services had been obtained of a person (unnamed) who had expertise in the Bessemer process and that the individual concerned had invested £10,000 as a sign of confidence in the undertaking. The firm of W & J Galloway & Sons had been very closely involved with Bessemer in both the early development and subsequent practical implementation of his process and were listed as one of the promoters. The prospectus added that

It is now universally admitted by scientific men and engineers that Bessemer's steel must ere long supersede the use of iron, where extra strength and lightness are essential; this fact will thus guarantee a large and continuous demand, and the present time is a most favourable opportunity in meeting this revolution in the manufacture of steel.

The Mechanics' Magazine wished the venture well, commenting that: "It has hitherto been rather disgraceful to English enterprise that we were unavoidably compelled to send to the Continent for the larger proportion of our steel forgings or castings."

By 1867 £96,000 of the shares had been issued.

== Trading ==
During 1864 the company was advertising itself as manufacturers of cast steel and files, as well as the only manufacturer of "Preston's Patent Self-Acting Machines for Forging and Cutting Files". The address given at that time was Lime Bank Street, Ardwick, and the advertisement went on to announce that 1000 tons of Bessemer steel per week would be produced when the works were completed, substantially more than envisaged in the prospectus. The company was seeking contracts for steel rail, engine crankshafts, steel plate, axles and other heavy industrial items. The Ardwick address was shown in a contemporary directory as being that of the Patent File Machine and File Manufacturing Co Ltd, of which Francis Preston was named the manager.

The steel produced comprised a mixture of different ores in an attempt to achieve the most useful material. In descending proportional order these were from the Workington, Harrington, West Cumberland, Wigan, Weardale and Forest of Dean areas. Spiegeleisen (an iron-carbon-manganese alloy) was added to the mixture.

The company claimed to have "conceded" an increase in the wages paid to its employees of 10%, which necessitated that it reduce its discount for both new files and the re-cutting of old files by 5% in 1868.

At some point during its short life, the company were producing engines for John Musgrave & Sons.

== Management ==
The board of directors in 1867 consisted of the following, all with addresses in Manchester:

- John Hall, chairman, a silversmith and also a director of Norton Iron Co Ltd of Stockton-on-Tees.
- James Fletcher, who was an engineer and also a director of William Collier & Co (Salford engineers) and of Hopkins, Gilkes & Co Ltd of Middlesbrough.
- Thomas Barton jnr, who was of the Mancunian firm Thomas Barton & Sons, cotton spinners and manufacturers, and also a director of the Guardian Plate Glass Insurance Co.
- Thomas Hodson, "Gentleman" and also a director of the Guardian Plate Glass Insurance Co. and the Manchester Villa and Cottage Association.
- John I. Mawson, a civil engineer whose address was given as Manchester Town Hall, was also a director of Manchester Real Property Co.
- Thomas C Ogden, a cotton spinner.

Charles Beyer had been named a director in the 1863 prospectus but is not named in 1867; a similar circumstance applied to Edward Watkin, who was president of the Grand Trunk Railway of Canada. Neither Hall nor Ogden were named at all in the prospectus.

Francis Preston, who was an engineer of Francis Preston & Co, Ancoats Bridge Works, Manchester, was also listed as a director and is also variously referred to as "manager" and as "managing director". Preston had obtained provisional protection on a patent for "improvements in machinery and apparatus used in the manufacture of steel and iron" on 17 January 1866. He was also patentee of the above-mentioned file manufacturing and cutting methods, some of them in conjunction with a William McGregor, and in 1862 had opened works at Lime Bank Street for the Patent File Manufacturing Company Limited.

== Failure and aftermath ==
The company appointed a liquidator in September 1867. The site and plant was bought in 1871 by Bolckow Vaughan, who produced steel there using the Bessemer process for a time until the building of their steelworks at Eston, which commenced in 1874, were completed in 1877. The works had been bought deliberately as a stand-in measure and were subsequently sold to the MS&LR so that it could manufacture its own rails. The MS&LR had installed two converters at its works in 1872. There is some uncertainty regarding what happened thereafter but it is possible that the MS&LR sold the factory to the Standard Iron & Steel Co around 1882.

It was being noted as early as 1895 in the UK that the heyday of the Bessemer process was over and that the cheaper open hearth method predominated. The Iron and Coal Trades Review said that the process was "in a semi-moribund condition. Year after year, it has not only ceased to make progress, but it has absolutely declined." It has been suggested, both at that time and more recently, that the cause of this was the lack of trained personnel and investment in technology rather than any intrinsic issue of the process itself. Bessemer steel production in the Lancashire area had virtually ceased by 1900, with just one manufacturer still in existence at Workington.
