= Moreuil station =

Railway station in Moreuil, France

Moreuil
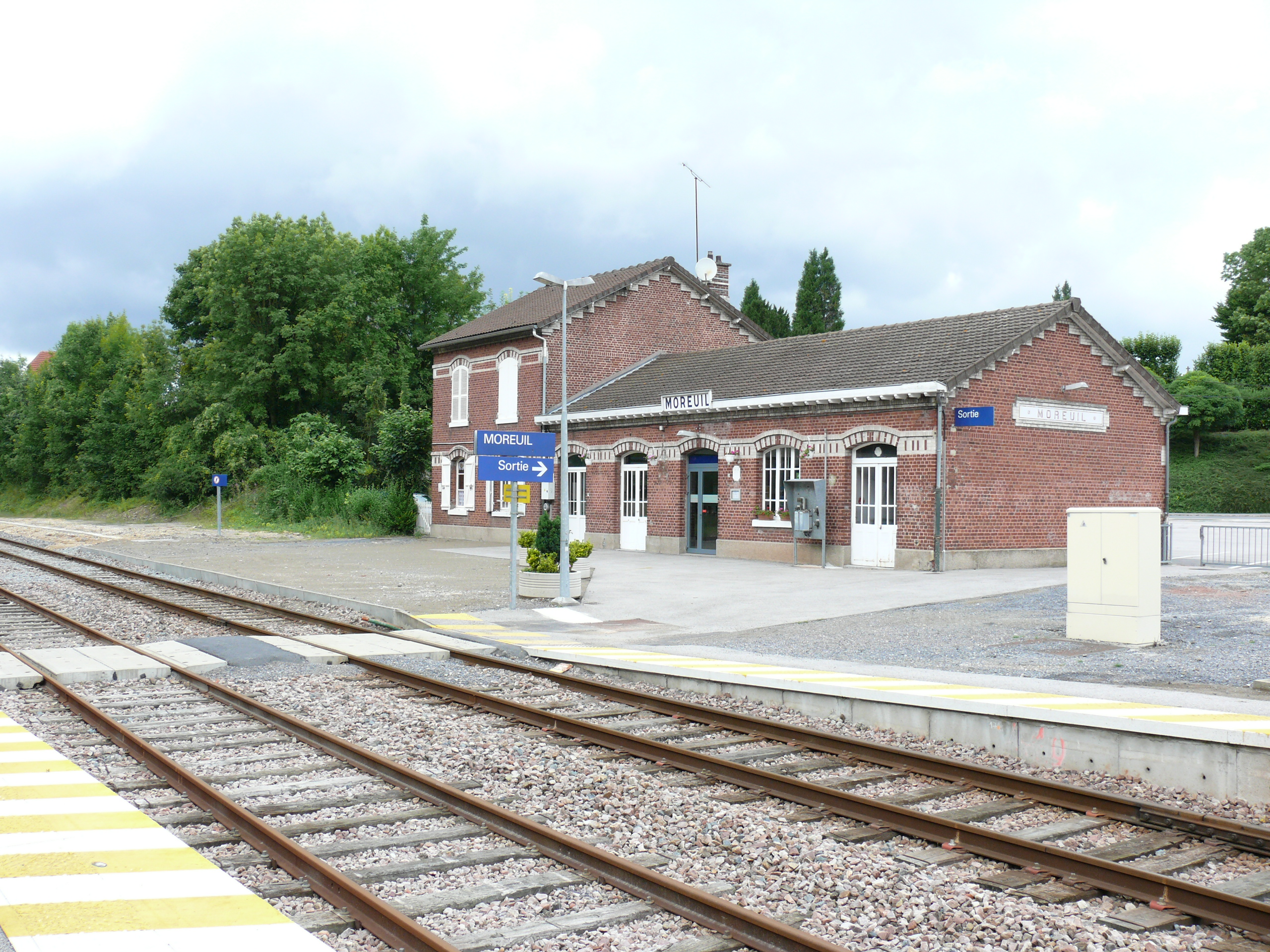

General information
- Location: rue Léon Blum; Moreuil
- Coordinates: 49°46′36″N 2°28′33″E
- Owner: SNCF
- Platforms: 2
- Tracks: 2

Construction
- Accessible: yes

Other information
- Station code: 87313320

Services
Preceding station	TER Hauts-de-France	Following station
Thézy-Glimont towards Amiens	Proxi P23	Hargicourt–Pierrepont towards Compiègne
Location

Moreuil station (French: Gare de Moreuil) is a railway station located in the commune of Moreuil in the Somme department, France. The station is served by TER Hauts-de-France trains (Amiens - Compiègne line).

== The station ==
The station was renovated and made accessible to the handicapped in 2003.

Together with Montdidier and Estrées-Saint-Denis, it is one of three points at which trains can pass each other along the line, which was reduced to single-track in the 1980s.

The station has a bicycle shed.

The station's goods facilities, which were formerly important, are no longer connected to the line but remain the property of the SNCF.

== Gallery ==
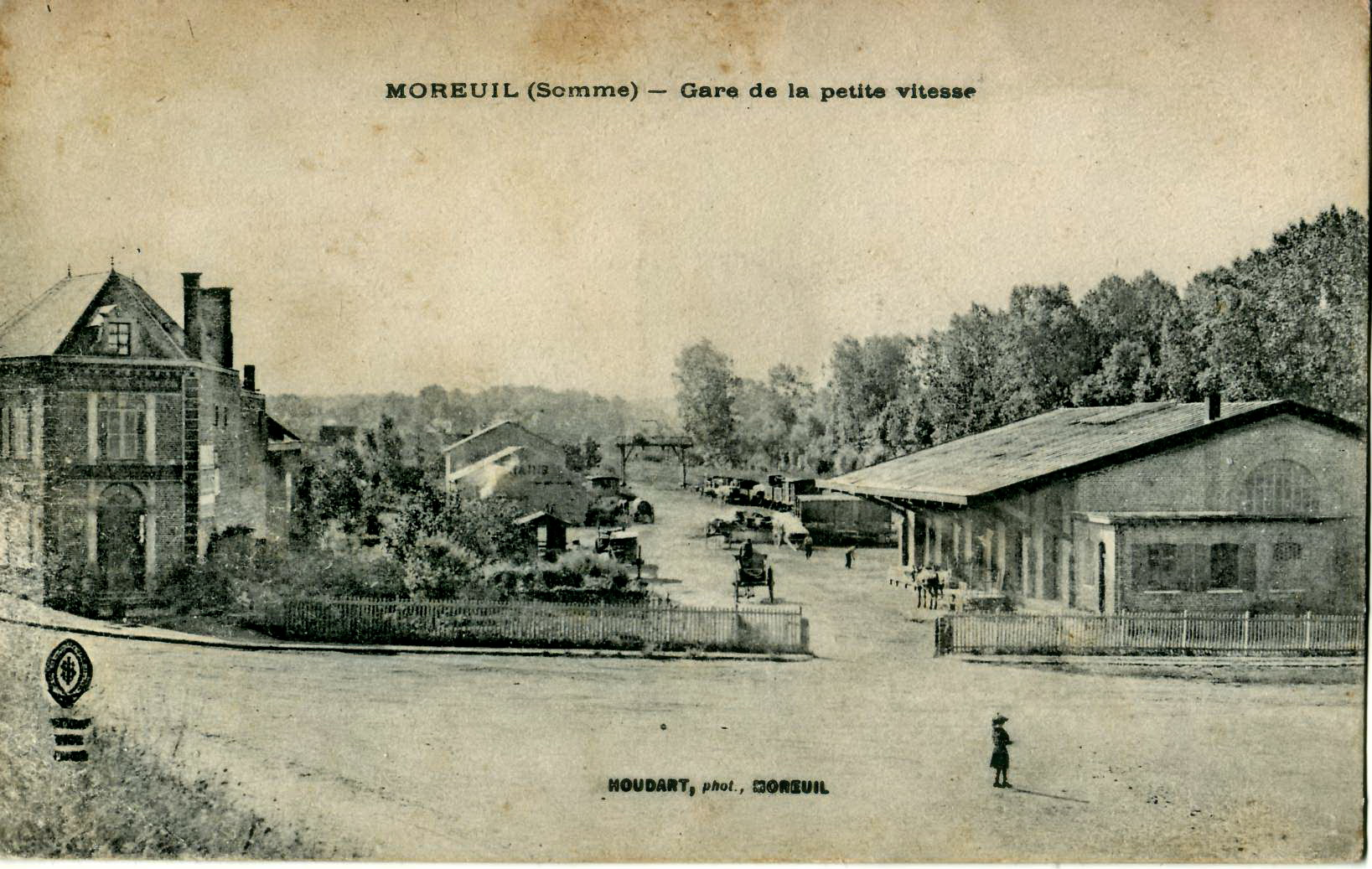
Moreuil station in the early 20th century, showing goods facilities

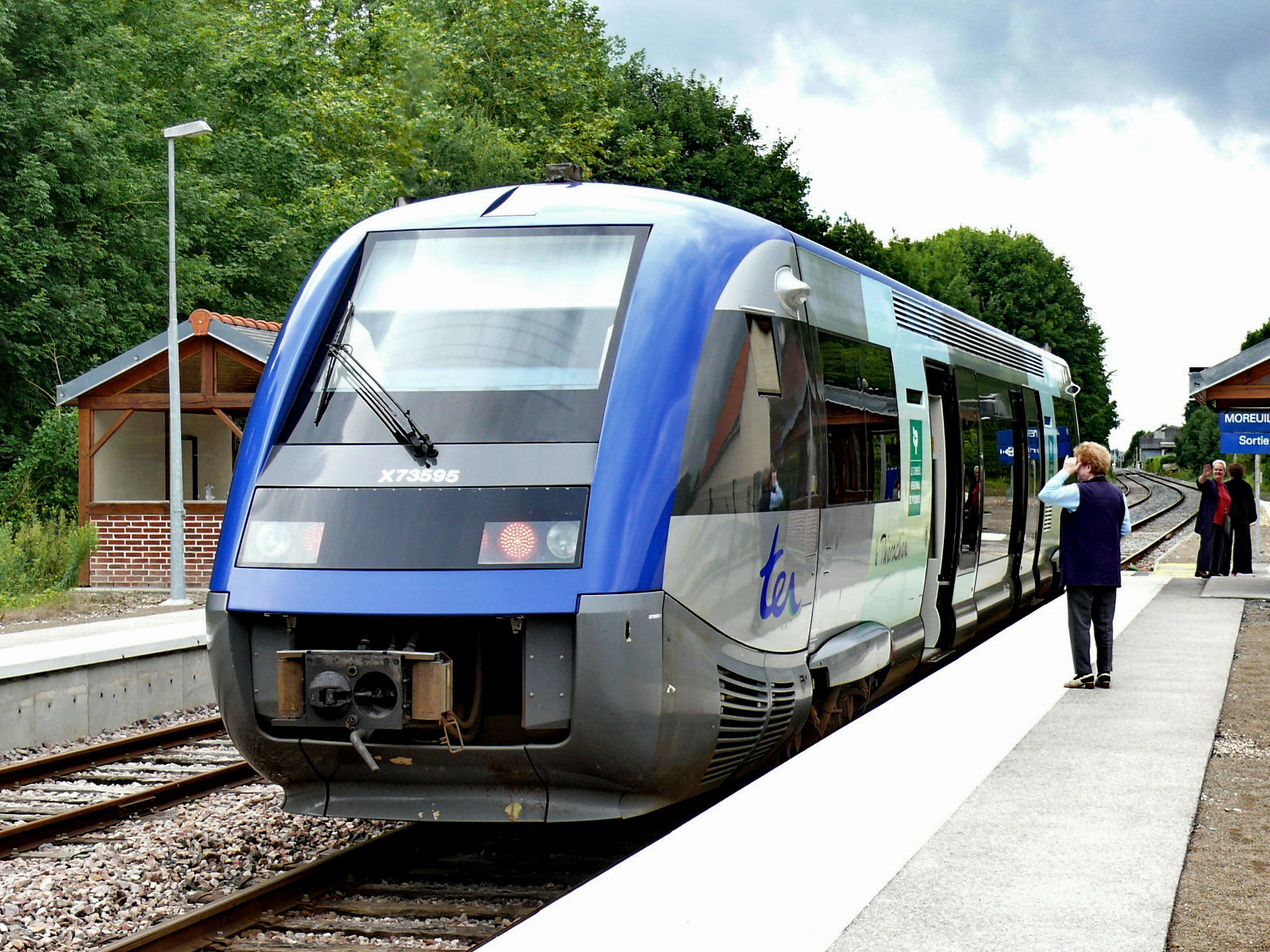
Modern X 73500 Railcar at Moreuil

== See also ==
- List of SNCF stations in Hauts-de-France
