= Hargicourt, Somme =

Hargicourt
- Part of Trois-Rivières
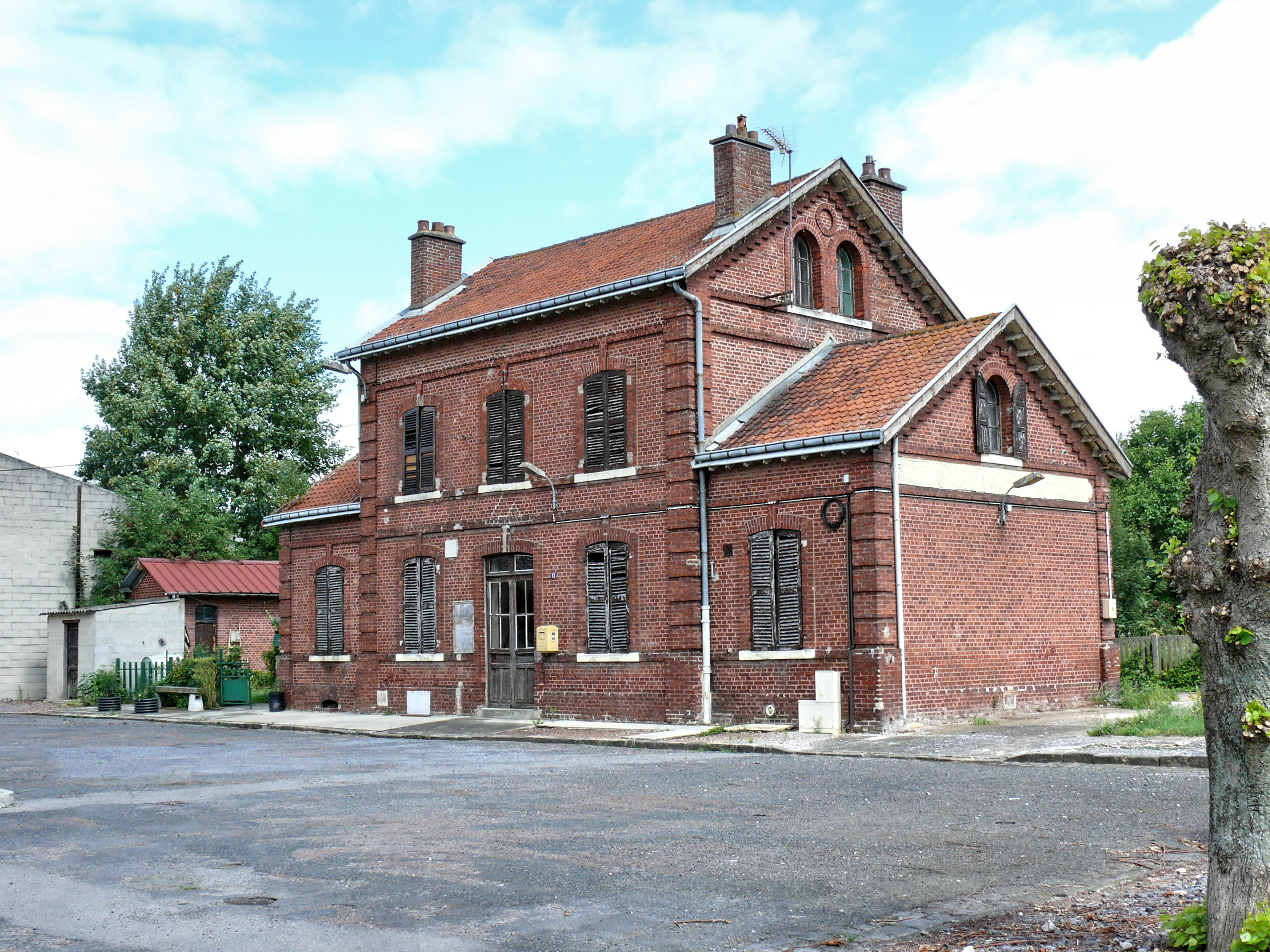
- The old railway station in Hargicourt
- Location of Hargicourt
- Location within France Location within Hauts-de-France
- Coordinates: 49°42′41″N 2°31′54″E
- Country: France
- Region: Hauts-de-France
- Department: Somme
- Arrondissement: Montdidier
- Canton: Roye
- Commune: Trois-Rivières
- Area^{1}: 5.19 km^{2} (2.00 sq mi)
- Elevation: 50 m (160 ft)
- Highest elevation: 109 m (358 ft)
- Lowest elevation: 40 m (130 ft)
- Population (2019): 406
  - Density: 78.2/km^{2} (203/sq mi)
- Time zone: UTC+01:00 (CET)
  - Summer (DST): UTC+02:00 (CEST)
- Postal code: 80500
- ^{1} French Land Register data, which excludes lakes, ponds, glaciers > 1 km^{2} (0.386 sq mi or 247 acres) and river estuaries.

Hargicourt (French pronunciation: [aʁʒikuʁ]) is a former commune in the Somme department in Hauts-de-France in northern France. On 1 January 2019, it was merged into the new commune Trois-Rivières.

== Geography ==
Hargicourt is situated on the D483 road, some 16 miles (26 km) southeast of Amiens.

== Population ==
Historical population
Year	Pop.	±% p.a.
1962	345	—
1968	334	−0.54%
1975	312	−0.97%
1982	341	+1.28%
1990	344	+0.11%
1999	357	+0.41%
2006	362	+0.20%
Source: EHESS

== See also ==
- Communes of the Somme department
