= Fontaine-au-Bois =

- Commune
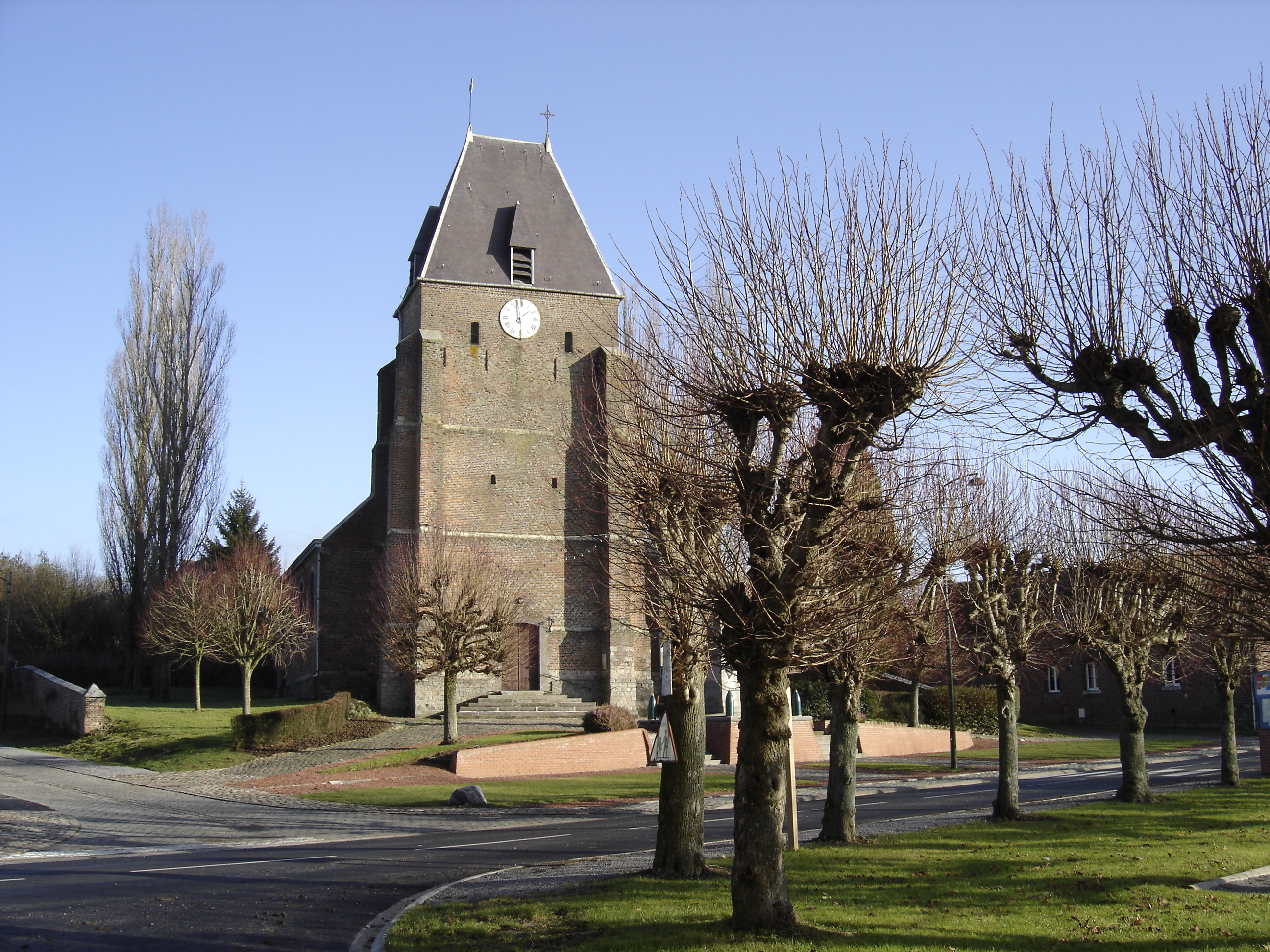
- Saint-Rémy church

- Coat of arms
- Location of Fontaine-au-Bois
- Location within France Location within Hauts-de-France
- Coordinates: 50°08′34″N 3°38′52″E
- Country: France
- Region: Hauts-de-France
- Department: Nord
- Arrondissement: Avesnes-sur-Helpe
- Canton: Avesnes-sur-Helpe
- Intercommunality: Pays de Mormal

Government
  - Mayor (2020–2026): Hélène Dumortier
- Area^{1}: 7.68 km^{2} (2.97 sq mi)
- Elevation: 138 m (453 ft)
- Highest elevation: 168 m (551 ft)
- Lowest elevation: 110 m (360 ft)
- Population (2023): 687
  - Density: 89.5/km^{2} (232/sq mi)
- Time zone: UTC+01:00 (CET)
  - Summer (DST): UTC+02:00 (CEST)
- INSEE/Postal code: 59242 /59550
- ^{1} French Land Register data, which excludes lakes, ponds, glaciers > 1 km^{2} (0.386 sq mi or 247 acres) and river estuaries.

Fontaine-au-Bois (French pronunciation: [fɔ̃tɛn o bwa]) is a commune in the Nord department in northern France.

== Heraldry ==
Arms of Fontaine-au-Bois	The arms of Fontaine-au-Bois are blazoned : Azure, a cross argent. (Bousies and Fontaine-au-Bois use the same arms.)

== See also ==
- Communes of the Nord department
