= Communauté de communes Avre Luce Moreuil =

Coordinates: 49.7728°N 2.4817°E

Avre Luce Moreuil
- Former communauté de communes
- Interactive map of Avre Luce Moreuil
- Country: France
- Region: Hauts-de-France
- Department: Somme
- No. of communes: {{{nbcomm}}}
- Disbanded: 2017

The Communauté de communes Avre Luce Moreuil is a former communauté de communes in the Somme département and in the Picardie région of France. It was created in December 1992. It was merged into the new Communauté de communes Avre Luce Noye in January 2017.

== Composition ==
This Communauté de communes comprised 23 communes:

1. Arvillers
2. Aubercourt
3. Beaucourt-en-Santerre
4. Berteaucourt-lès-Thennes
5. Braches
6. Cayeux-en-Santerre
7. Contoire
8. Démuin
9. Domart-sur-la-Luce
10. Fresnoy-en-Chaussée
11. Hailles
12. Hangard
13. Hangest-en-Santerre
14. Ignaucourt
15. La Neuville-Sire-Bernard
16. Le Plessier-Rozainvillers
17. Le Quesnel
18. Mézières-en-Santerre
19. Moreuil
20. Morisel
21. Pierrepont-sur-Avre
22. Thennes
23. Villers-aux-Érables

== See also ==
- Communes of the Somme department
