= Communauté de communes du Santerre =

Coordinates: 49.8146°N 2.7019°E

Santerre
- Former communauté de communes
- Interactive map of Santerre
- Country: France
- Region: Hauts-de-France
- Department: Somme
- No. of communes: {{{nbcomm}}}
- Established: 1993
- Disbanded: 2017

The Communauté de communes du Santerre is a former communauté de communes in the Somme département and in the Picardie région of France. It was created in December 1993. It was merged into the new Communauté de communes Terre de Picardie in January 2017.

== Composition ==
This Communauté de communes comprised 20 communes:

1. Bayonvillers
2. Beaufort-en-Santerre
3. Bouchoir
4. Caix
5. Chilly
6. Folies
7. Fouquescourt
8. Fransart
9. Guillaucourt
10. Hallu
11. Harbonnières
12. La Chavatte
13. Maucourt
14. Méharicourt
15. Parvillers-le-Quesnoy
16. Rosières-en-Santerre
17. Rouvroy-en-Santerre
18. Vrély
19. Warvillers
20. Wiencourt-l'Équipée

== See also ==
- Communes of the Somme department
