= Canton of Rosières-en-Santerre =

Coordinates: 49°48′54″N 2°42′11″E

Rosières-en-Santerre
- Former canton
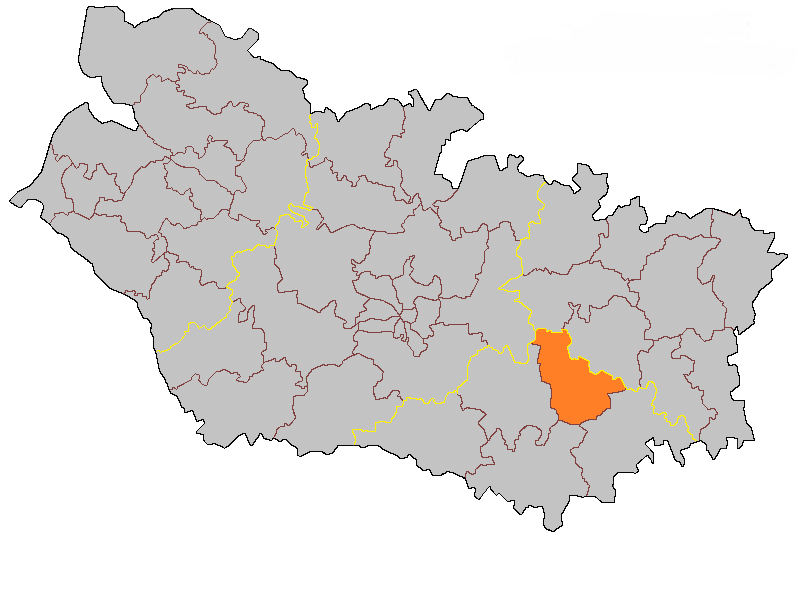
- Country: France
- Region: Hauts-de-France
- Department: Somme
- No. of communes: {{{nbcomm}}}
- Disbanded: 2015
- Area: 130.33 km^{2} (50.32 sq mi)
- Population (2012): 9,296
  - Density: 71.33/km^{2} (184.7/sq mi)

The Canton of Rosières-en-Santerre is a former canton situated in the department of the Somme and in the Picardie region of northern France. It was disbanded following the French canton reorganisation which came into effect in March 2015. It had 9,296 inhabitants (2012).

== Geography ==
The canton is organised around the commune of Rosières-en-Santerre in the arrondissement of Montdidier. The altitude varies from 52 m (Guillaucourt) to 106 m (Bouchoir) for an average of 91 m.

The canton comprised 20 communes:

- Bayonvillers
- Beaufort-en-Santerre
- Bouchoir
- Caix
- La Chavatte
- Chilly
- Folies
- Fouquescourt
- Fransart
- Guillaucourt
- Hallu
- Harbonnières
- Maucourt
- Méharicourt
- Parvillers-le-Quesnoy
- Punchy
- Rosières-en-Santerre
- Rouvroy-en-Santerre
- Vrély
- Warvillers

== Population ==
Population Growth
1962	1968	1975	1982	1990	1999
7643	8159	8051	7963	8111	8355
Census count starting from 1962 : Population without double counting

== See also ==
- Arrondissements of the Somme department
- Cantons of the Somme department
- Communes of the Somme department
