= Santerre =

Santerre may refer to:

- Santerre (region), a geographical area in Picardy, France
- Andy Santerre (born 1968), American racing car driver
- Antoine Joseph Santerre (1752–1809), French businessman and general
- Jean-Baptiste Santerre (1650–1717), French painter
