= Hangest =

Hangest is part of the name of two communes in the Somme department of northern France:

- Hangest-en-Santerre
- Hangest-sur-Somme
