= Mézières-en-Santerre =

- Commune
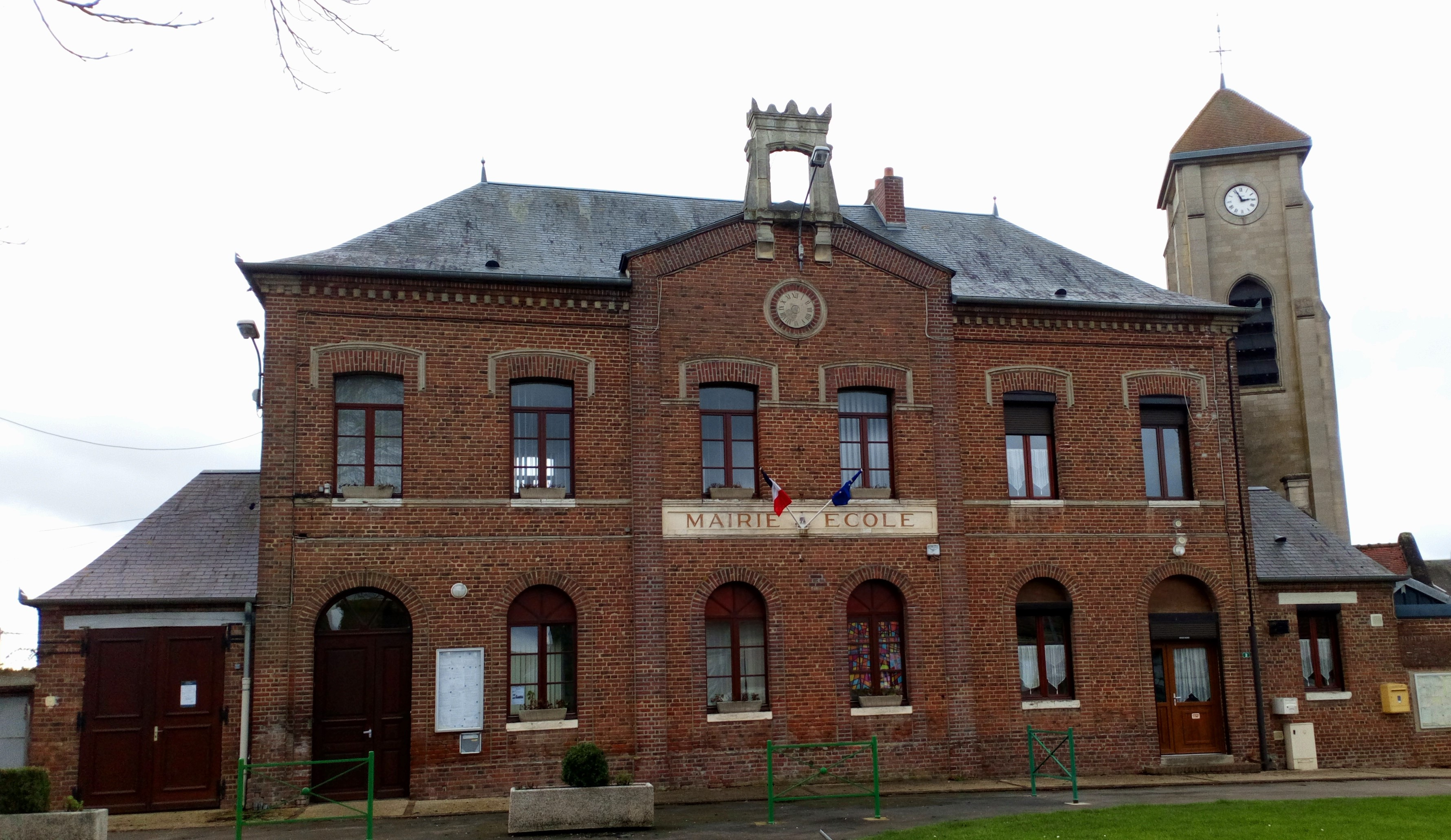
- Mézières-en-Santerre Town hall

- Coat of arms
- Location of Mézières-en-Santerre
- Location within France Location within Hauts-de-France
- Coordinates: 49°47′12″N 2°33′21″E
- Country: France
- Region: Hauts-de-France
- Department: Somme
- Arrondissement: Montdidier
- Canton: Moreuil
- Intercommunality: CC Avre Luce Noye

Government
  - Mayor (2020–2026): Paul Viollette
- Area^{1}: 10.71 km^{2} (4.14 sq mi)
- Elevation: 98 m (322 ft)
- Highest elevation: 105 m (344 ft)
- Lowest elevation: 63 m (207 ft)
- Population (2023): 521
  - Density: 48.6/km^{2} (126/sq mi)
- Time zone: UTC+01:00 (CET)
  - Summer (DST): UTC+02:00 (CEST)
- INSEE/Postal code: 80545 /80110
- ^{1} French Land Register data, which excludes lakes, ponds, glaciers > 1 km^{2} (0.386 sq mi or 247 acres) and river estuaries.

Mézières-en-Santerre (French pronunciation: [mezjɛʁ ɑ̃ sɑ̃tɛʁ], literally Mézières in Santerre; Picard: Mézière-in-Santérre) is a commune in the Somme department in Hauts-de-France in northern France.

== Geography ==
The commune is situated on the D28 road, 24 kilometres (15 mi) southeast of Amiens.

== Population ==
Historical population
Year	Pop.	±% p.a.
1968	391	—
1975	344	−1.81%
1982	404	+2.32%
1990	453	+1.44%
1999	493	+0.94%
2007	538	+1.10%
2012	536	−0.07%
2017	589	+1.90%
2023	521	−2.02%
Source: INSEE

== See also ==
- Communes of the Somme department
