= Le Quesnel =

- Commune
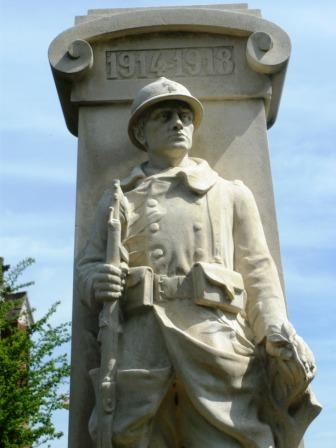
- The war memorial in Le Quesnel
- Location of Le Quesnel
- Location within France Location within Hauts-de-France
- Coordinates: 49°46′33″N 2°37′32″E
- Country: France
- Region: Hauts-de-France
- Department: Somme
- Arrondissement: Montdidier
- Canton: Moreuil
- Intercommunality: CC Avre Luce Noye

Government
  - Mayor (2020–2026): Brice Chantrelle
- Area^{1}: 11.38 km^{2} (4.39 sq mi)
- Elevation: 97 m (318 ft)
- Highest elevation: 104 m (341 ft)
- Lowest elevation: 72 m (236 ft)
- Population (2023): 764
  - Density: 67.1/km^{2} (174/sq mi)
- Time zone: UTC+01:00 (CET)
  - Summer (DST): UTC+02:00 (CEST)
- INSEE/Postal code: 80652 /80118
- ^{1} French Land Register data, which excludes lakes, ponds, glaciers > 1 km^{2} (0.386 sq mi or 247 acres) and river estuaries.

Le Quesnel (French pronunciation: [lə kenɛl]; Picard: L'Tchini) is a commune in the Somme department in Hauts-de-France in northern France.

== Geography ==
The commune is situated at the D161 and D41 crossroads, some 20 miles (32 km) southeast of Amiens.

== Population ==
Historical population
Year	Pop.	±% p.a.
1968	562	—
1975	480	−2.23%
1982	409	−2.26%
1990	436	+0.80%
1999	540	+2.41%
2007	677	+2.87%
2012	769	+2.58%
2017	792	+0.59%
2023	764	−0.60%
Source: INSEE

== Places of interest ==
- Church of Saint Leger, known as the Cathedral of the Santerre" as it is the biggest church in the region, with a 50m high tower.
- The Le Quesnel Canadian Battlefield Memorial and Commemorative park.

== See also ==
- Communes of the Somme department
