= Canton of Moreuil =

Coordinates: 49°46′31″N 2°29′2″E

Moreuil
- Canton
- Interactive map of Moreuil
- Country: France
- Region: Hauts-de-France
- Department: Somme
- No. of communes: {{{nbcomm}}}
- Area: 315.23 km^{2} (121.71 sq mi)
- Population (2023): 21,210
  - Density: 67.28/km^{2} (174.3/sq mi)
- INSEE code: 80 19

The Canton of Moreuil is a canton situated in the department of the Somme and in the Hauts-de-France region of northern France.

== Geography ==
The canton is organised around the commune of Moreuil.

== Composition ==
At the French canton reorganisation which came into effect in March 2015, the canton was expanded from 23 to 41 communes:

- Arvillers
- Aubercourt
- Bayonvillers
- Beaucourt-en-Santerre
- Beaufort-en-Santerre
- Berteaucourt-lès-Thennes
- Bouchoir
- Braches
- Caix
- Cayeux-en-Santerre
- La Chavatte
- Chilly
- Démuin
- Domart-sur-la-Luce
- Folies
- Fouquescourt
- Fransart
- Fresnoy-en-Chaussée
- Guillaucourt
- Hailles
- Hallu
- Hangard
- Hangest-en-Santerre
- Harbonnières
- Ignaucourt
- Maucourt
- Méharicourt
- Mézières-en-Santerre
- Moreuil
- Morisel
- La Neuville-Sire-Bernard
- Parvillers-le-Quesnoy
- Le Plessier-Rozainvillers
- Le Quesnel
- Rosières-en-Santerre
- Rouvroy-en-Santerre
- Thennes
- Villers-aux-Érables
- Vrély
- Warvillers
- Wiencourt-l'Équipée

== Population ==
Historical population
Year	Pop.	±% p.a.
2013	22,694	—
2018	22,774	+0.07%
Source: INSEE

== See also ==
- Arrondissements of the Somme department
- Cantons of the Somme department
- Communes of the Somme department
