= Morisel =

- Commune
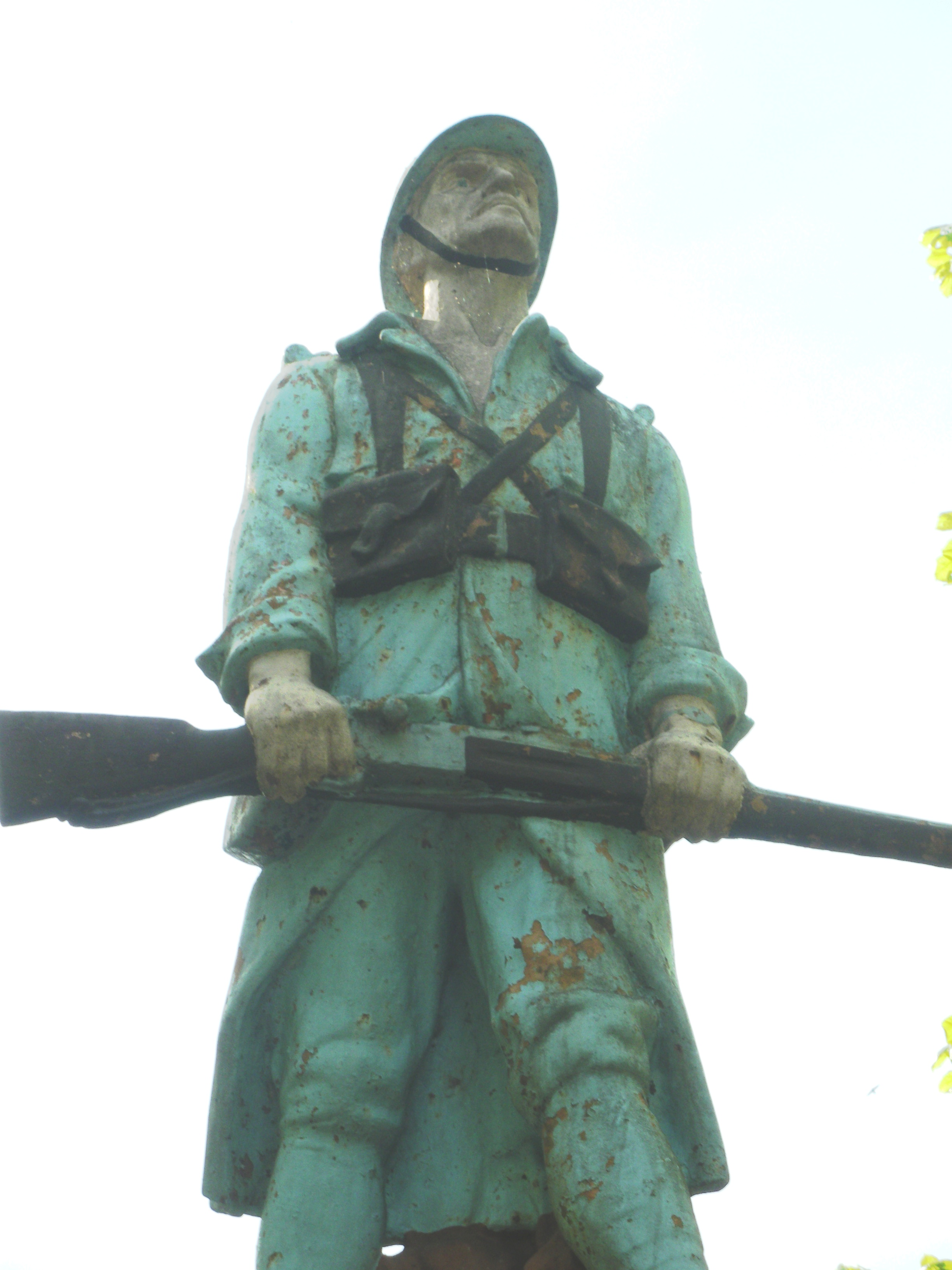
- The war memorial in Morisel
- Location of Morisel
- Location within France Location within Hauts-de-France
- Coordinates: 49°46′13″N 2°28′33″E
- Country: France
- Region: Hauts-de-France
- Department: Somme
- Arrondissement: Montdidier
- Canton: Moreuil
- Intercommunality: CC Avre Luce Noye

Government
  - Mayor (2020–2026): Michel Van De Velde
- Area^{1}: 6.43 km^{2} (2.48 sq mi)
- Elevation: 43 m (141 ft)
- Highest elevation: 109 m (358 ft)
- Lowest elevation: 32 m (105 ft)
- Population (2023): 469
  - Density: 72.9/km^{2} (189/sq mi)
- Time zone: UTC+01:00 (CET)
  - Summer (DST): UTC+02:00 (CEST)
- INSEE/Postal code: 80571 /80110
- ^{1} French Land Register data, which excludes lakes, ponds, glaciers > 1 km^{2} (0.386 sq mi or 247 acres) and river estuaries.

Morisel (French pronunciation: [mɔʁizɛl]; picard: Morisi) is a commune in the Somme department in Hauts-de-France in northern France.

== Geography ==
Morisel is situated on the D920 road, some 15 miles (24 km) southeast of Amiens on the banks of the river Avre.

== Population ==
Historical population
Year	Pop.	±% p.a.
1968	455	—
1975	443	−0.38%
1982	451	+0.26%
1990	430	−0.59%
1999	429	−0.03%
2007	537	+2.85%
2012	510	−1.03%
2017	518	+0.31%
2023	469	−1.64%
Source: INSEE

== See also ==
- Communes of the Somme department
