= Beaucourt-en-Santerre =

- Commune
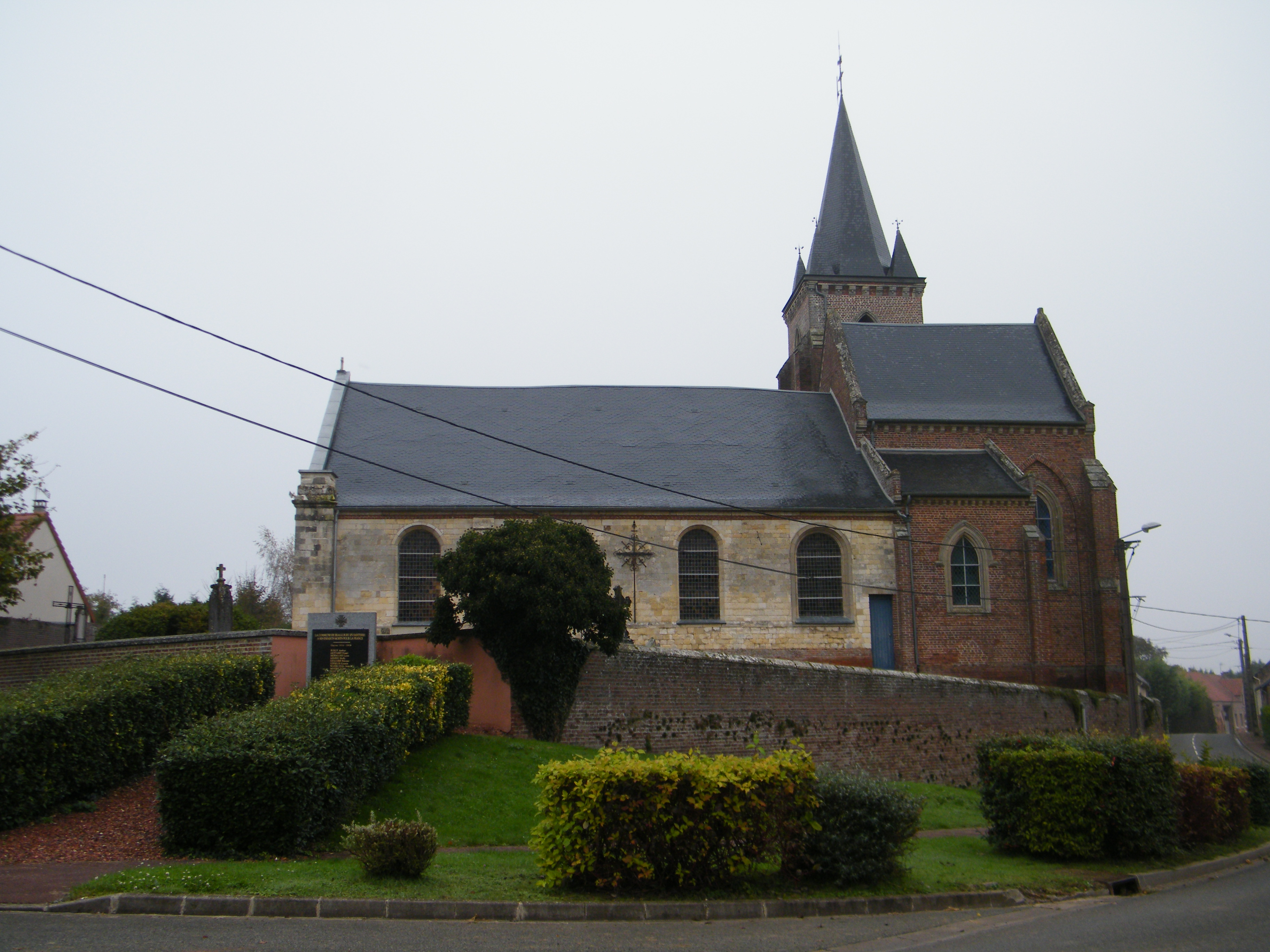
- The church in Beaucourt-en-Santerre
- Location of Beaucourt-en-Santerre
- Location within France Location within Hauts-de-France
- Coordinates: 49°47′38″N 2°35′11″E
- Country: France
- Region: Hauts-de-France
- Department: Somme
- Arrondissement: Montdidier
- Canton: Moreuil
- Intercommunality: CC Avre Luce Noye

Government
  - Mayor (2020–2026): Hubert Capelle
- Area^{1}: 5.95 km^{2} (2.30 sq mi)
- Elevation: 95 m (312 ft)
- Highest elevation: 99 m (325 ft)
- Lowest elevation: 58 m (190 ft)
- Population (2023): 161
  - Density: 27.1/km^{2} (70.1/sq mi)
- Time zone: UTC+01:00 (CET)
  - Summer (DST): UTC+02:00 (CEST)
- INSEE/Postal code: 80064 /80110
- ^{1} French Land Register data, which excludes lakes, ponds, glaciers > 1 km^{2} (0.386 sq mi or 247 acres) and river estuaries.

Beaucourt-en-Santerre (French pronunciation: [bokuʁ ɑ̃ sɑ̃tɛʁ], literally Beaucourt in Santerre) is a commune in the Somme department in Hauts-de-France in northern France.

== Geography ==
The commune is situated 15 miles (24 km) southeast of Amiens on the D28 and D934 junction

== Population ==
Historical population
Year	Pop.	±% p.a.
1968	83	—
1975	84	+0.17%
1982	82	−0.34%
1990	101	+2.64%
1999	114	+1.35%
2007	169	+5.04%
2012	182	+1.49%
2017	176	−0.67%
2023	161	−1.47%
Source: INSEE

== See also ==
- Communes of the Somme department
