= Hailles =

- Commune
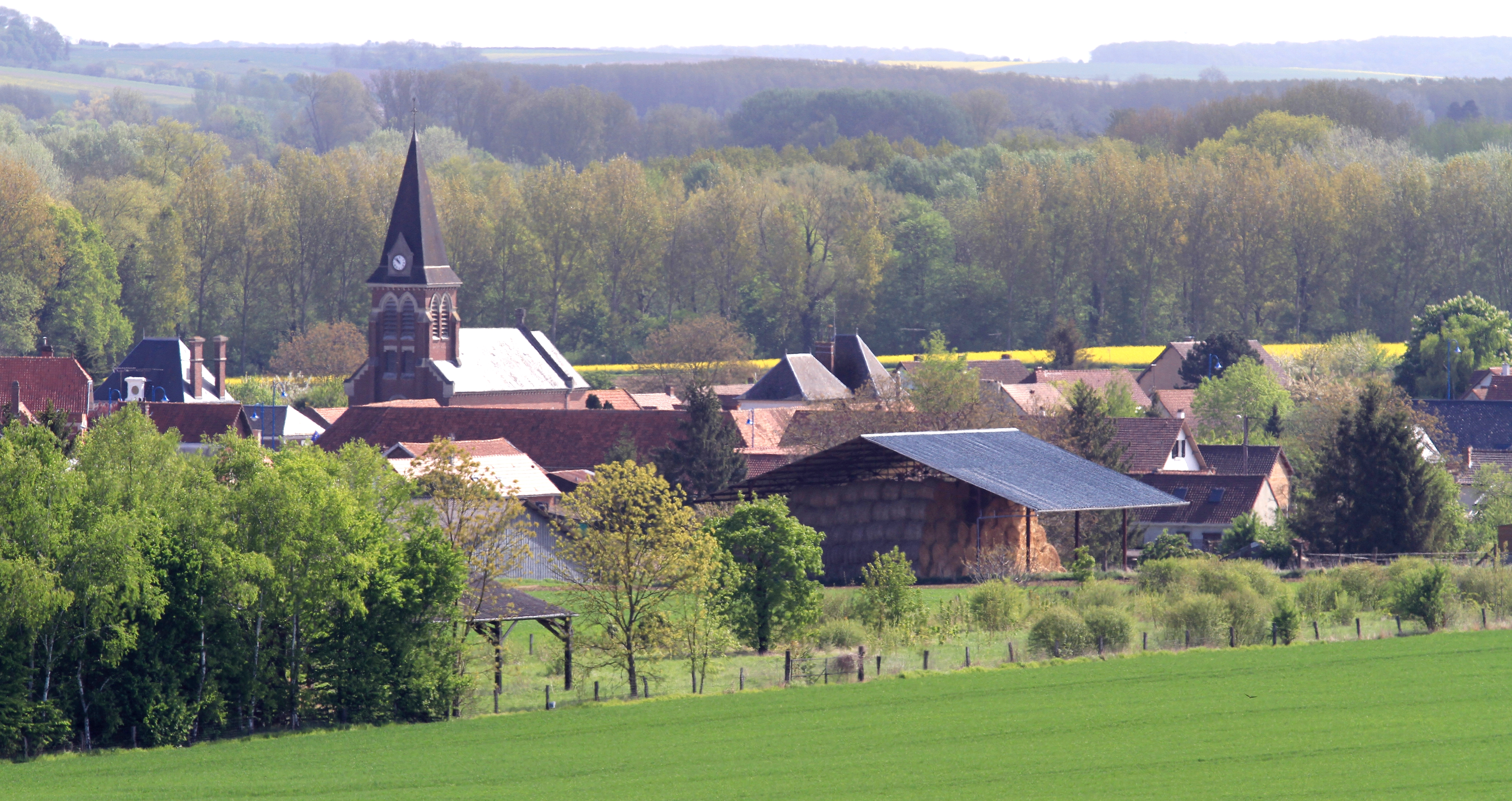
- A general view of Hailles
- Location of Hailles
- Location within France Location within Hauts-de-France
- Coordinates: 49°48′22″N 2°26′23″E
- Country: France
- Region: Hauts-de-France
- Department: Somme
- Arrondissement: Montdidier
- Canton: Moreuil
- Intercommunality: CC Avre Luce Noye

Government
  - Mayor (2020–2026): Fabrice Veront
- Area^{1}: 5.07 km^{2} (1.96 sq mi)
- Elevation: 35 m (115 ft)
- Highest elevation: 110 m (360 ft)
- Lowest elevation: 32 m (105 ft)
- Population (2023): 404
  - Density: 79.7/km^{2} (206/sq mi)
- Time zone: UTC+01:00 (CET)
  - Summer (DST): UTC+02:00 (CEST)
- INSEE/Postal code: 80405 /80440
- ^{1} French Land Register data, which excludes lakes, ponds, glaciers > 1 km^{2} (0.386 sq mi or 247 acres) and river estuaries.

Hailles (French pronunciation: [aj]) is a commune in the Somme department in Hauts-de-France in northern France.

== Geography ==
Hailles is situated on the banks of the river Avre and by the D90e road, some 10 miles (16 km) southeast of Amiens.

== History ==
The name probably comes from 'haie' (eng: hedge), and has been variously written as Haies or Heilles. During the Franco-Prussian War of 1870, some francs-tireurs, hidden behind the town fired 60 times on a Prussian officer. All missed, he wasn't even scratched. The German troops threatened to burn down the town.

== Population ==
Historical population

| Year | Pop. | ±% p.a. |
|---|---|---|
| 1793 | 244 | — |
| 1821 | 356 | +1.36% |
| 1846 | 470 | +1.12% |
| 1872 | 373 | −0.89% |
| 1901 | 268 | −1.13% |
| 1911 | 253 | −0.57% |
| 1921 | 152 | −4.97% |
| 1936 | 201 | +1.88% |
| 1946 | 214 | +0.63% |
| 1962 | 226 | +0.34% |

| Year | Pop. | ±% p.a. |
|---|---|---|
| 1968 | 236 | +0.72% |
| 1975 | 219 | −1.06% |
| 1982 | 263 | +2.65% |
| 1990 | 319 | +2.44% |
| 1999 | 332 | +0.44% |
| 2007 | 426 | +3.17% |
| 2012 | 429 | +0.14% |
| 2017 | 422 | −0.33% |
| 2023 | 404 | −0.72% |

Source: EHESS and INSEE (1968-2023)

== See also ==
- Communes of the Somme department
