= Hangest-en-Santerre =

- Commune
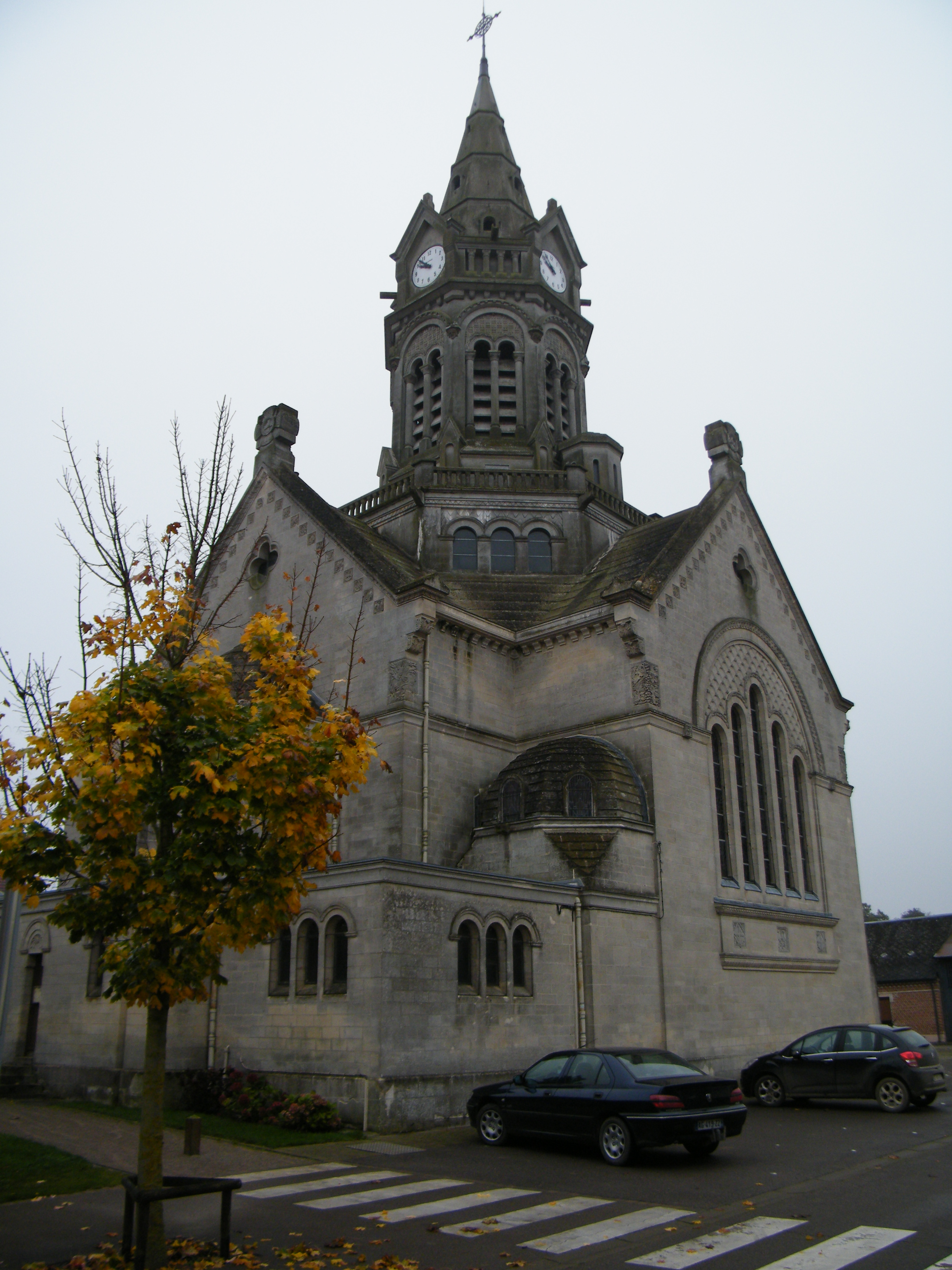
- The church in Hangest-en-Santerre

- Coat of arms
- Location of Hangest-en-Santerre
- Location within France Location within Hauts-de-France
- Coordinates: 49°45′15″N 2°36′24″E
- Country: France
- Region: Hauts-de-France
- Department: Somme
- Arrondissement: Montdidier
- Canton: Moreuil
- Intercommunality: CC Avre Luce Noye

Government
  - Mayor (2020–2026): Patrick Jubert
- Area^{1}: 15.08 km^{2} (5.82 sq mi)
- Elevation: 105 m (344 ft)
- Highest elevation: 109 m (358 ft)
- Lowest elevation: 84 m (276 ft)
- Population (2023): 1,027
  - Density: 68.10/km^{2} (176.4/sq mi)
- Time zone: UTC+01:00 (CET)
  - Summer (DST): UTC+02:00 (CEST)
- INSEE/Postal code: 80415 /80134
- ^{1} French Land Register data, which excludes lakes, ponds, glaciers > 1 km^{2} (0.386 sq mi or 247 acres) and river estuaries.

Hangest-en-Santerre (French pronunciation: [ɑ̃ʒɛst ɑ̃ sɑ̃tɛʁ], literally Hangest in Santerre) is a commune in the Somme department in Hauts-de-France in northern France.

== Geography ==
The commune is situated at the D41 and D54 crossroads, 16 kilometres (10 mi) southeast of Amiens.

== Population ==
Historical population
Year	Pop.	±% p.a.
1968	801	—
1975	769	−0.58%
1982	703	−1.27%
1990	723	+0.35%
1999	839	+1.67%
2007	995	+2.15%
2012	1,027	+0.64%
2017	1,016	−0.22%
2023	1,027	+0.18%
Source: INSEE

== See also ==
- Communes of the Somme department
