= Ignaucourt =

- Commune
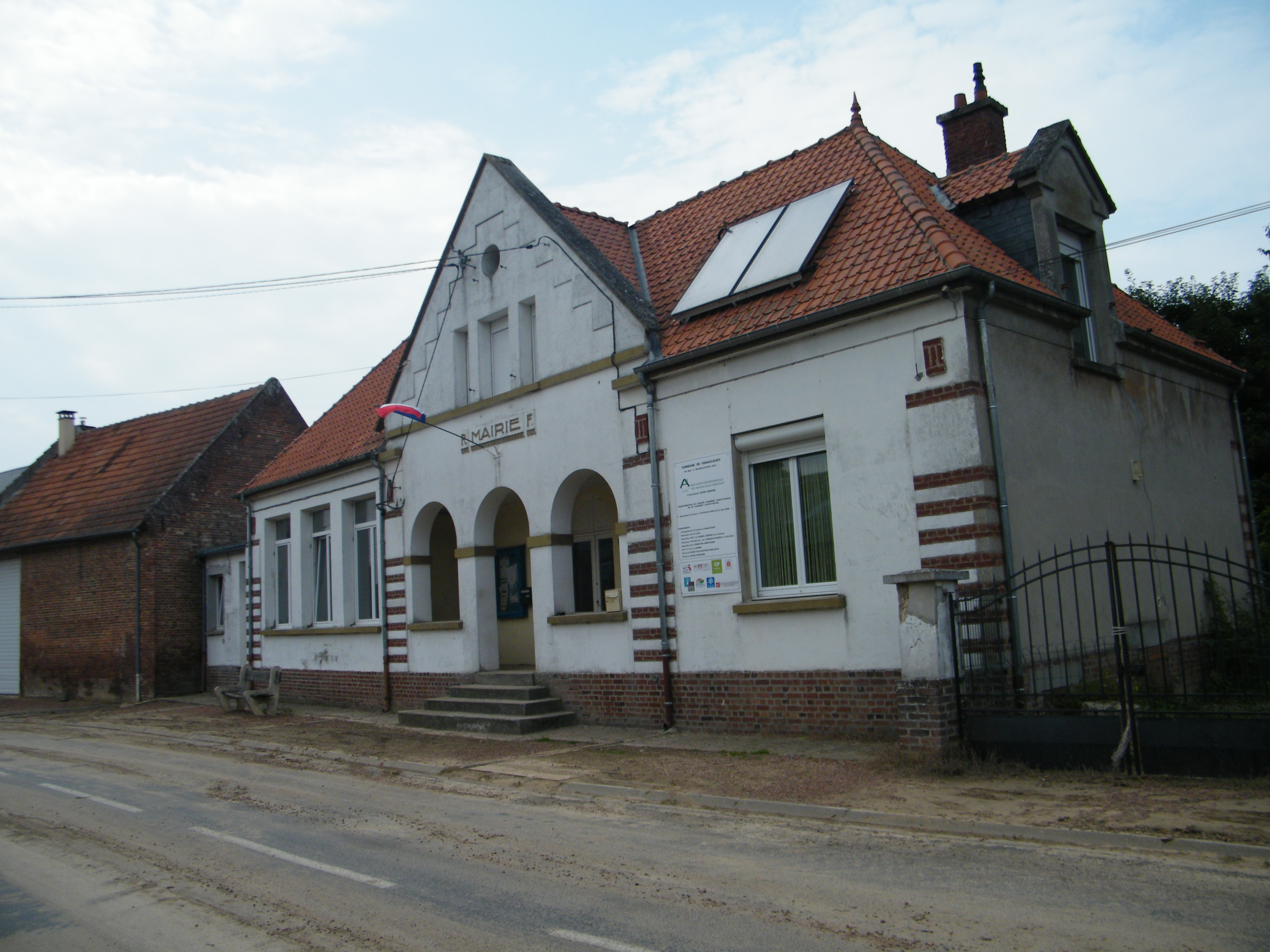
- The town hall in Ignaucourt
- Location of Ignaucourt
- Location within France Location within Hauts-de-France
- Coordinates: 49°49′36″N 2°34′28″E
- Country: France
- Region: Hauts-de-France
- Department: Somme
- Arrondissement: Montdidier
- Canton: Moreuil
- Intercommunality: Avre Luce Noye

Government
  - Mayor (2020–2026): Pascal Berthe
- Area^{1}: 4.19 km^{2} (1.62 sq mi)
- Elevation: 40 m (130 ft)
- Highest elevation: 99 m (325 ft)
- Lowest elevation: 46 m (151 ft)
- Population (2023): 65
  - Density: 16/km^{2} (40/sq mi)
- Time zone: UTC+01:00 (CET)
  - Summer (DST): UTC+02:00 (CEST)
- INSEE/Postal code: 80449 /80800
- ^{1} French Land Register data, which excludes lakes, ponds, glaciers > 1 km^{2} (0.386 sq mi or 247 acres) and river estuaries.

Ignaucourt (French pronunciation: [iɲokuʁ]) is a commune in the Somme department in Hauts-de-France in northern France.

== Geography ==
Ignaucourt is situated on the D76 road, some 15 miles (24 km) southeast of Amiens.

== Population ==
Historical population
Year	Pop.	±% p.a.
1968	79	—
1975	81	+0.36%
1982	64	−3.31%
1990	63	−0.20%
1999	82	+2.97%
2007	75	−1.11%
2012	91	+3.94%
2017	76	−3.54%
2023	65	−2.57%
Source: INSEE

== See also ==
- Communes of the Somme department
