= Fresnoy-en-Chaussée =

- Commune
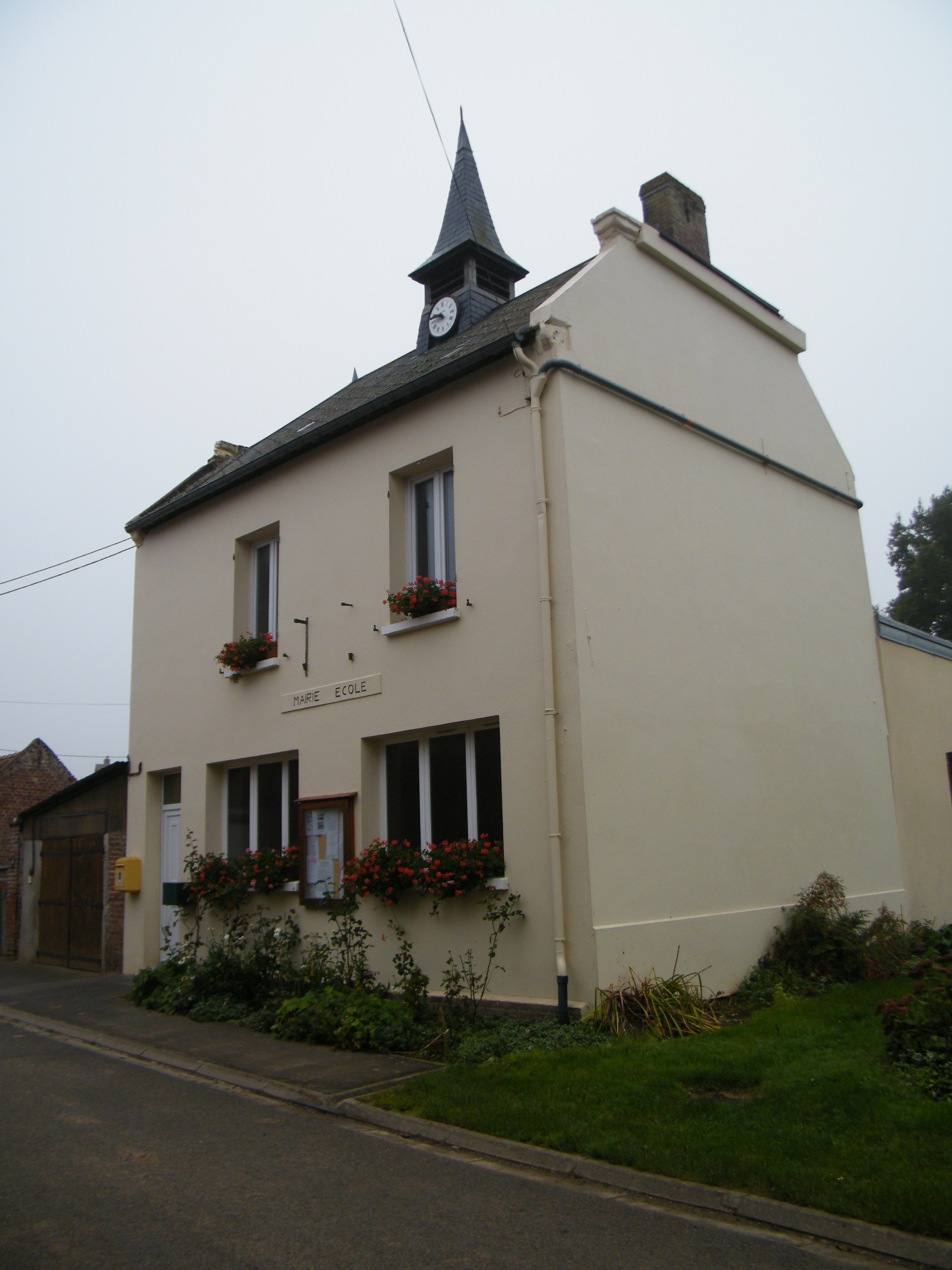
- The town hall in Fresnoy-en-Chaussée
- Location of Fresnoy-en-Chaussée
- Location within France Location within Hauts-de-France
- Coordinates: 49°46′24″N 2°35′12″E
- Country: France
- Region: Hauts-de-France
- Department: Somme
- Arrondissement: Montdidier
- Canton: Moreuil
- Intercommunality: CC Avre Luce Noye

Government
  - Mayor (2020–2026): Franck Ten
- Area^{1}: 3.8 km^{2} (1.5 sq mi)
- Elevation: 104 m (341 ft)
- Highest elevation: 105 m (344 ft)
- Lowest elevation: 83 m (272 ft)
- Population (2023): 138
  - Density: 36/km^{2} (94/sq mi)
- Time zone: UTC+01:00 (CET)
  - Summer (DST): UTC+02:00 (CEST)
- INSEE/Postal code: 80358 /80110
- ^{1} French Land Register data, which excludes lakes, ponds, glaciers > 1 km^{2} (0.386 sq mi or 247 acres) and river estuaries.

Fresnoy-en-Chaussée (French pronunciation: [fʁɛnwa ɑ̃ ʃose]) is a commune in the Somme department in Hauts-de-France in northern France.

== Geography ==
The commune is situated 20 miles (32 km) southeast of Amiens just by the D934 road

== Population ==
Historical population
Year	Pop.	±% p.a.
1968	103	—
1975	67	−5.96%
1982	73	+1.23%
1990	84	+1.77%
1999	111	+3.15%
2007	109	−0.23%
2012	120	+1.94%
2017	148	+4.28%
2023	138	−1.16%
Source: INSEE

== See also ==
- Communes of the Somme department
