= La Neuville-Sire-Bernard =

- Commune
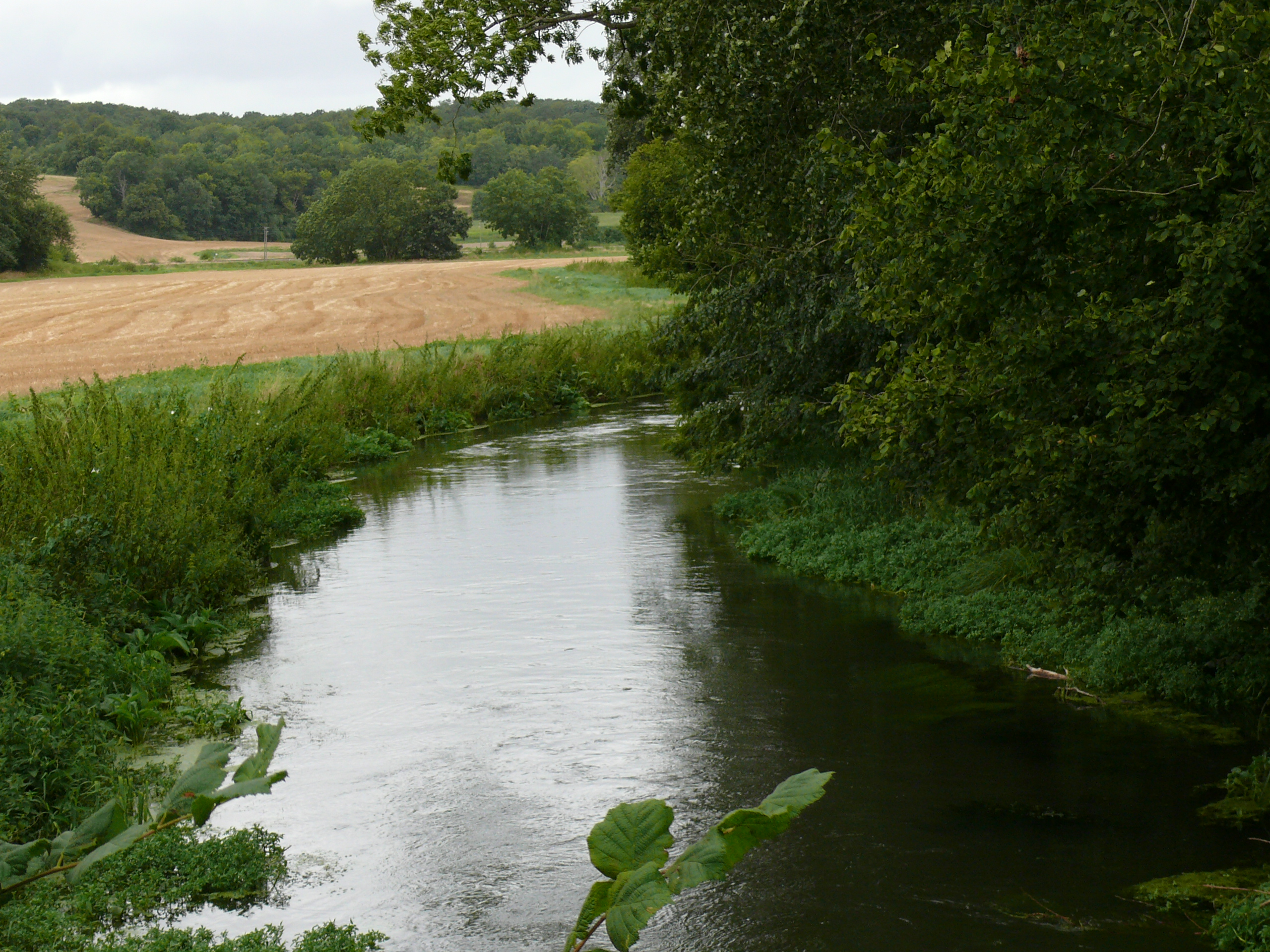
- The Avre river at La Neuville-Sire-Bernard
- Location of La Neuville-Sire-Bernard
- Location within France Location within Hauts-de-France
- Coordinates: 49°44′33″N 2°30′57″E
- Country: France
- Region: Hauts-de-France
- Department: Somme
- Arrondissement: Montdidier
- Canton: Moreuil
- Intercommunality: CC Avre Luce Noye

Government
  - Mayor (2024–2026): Marie-Annick Baron
- Area^{1}: 4.18 km^{2} (1.61 sq mi)
- Elevation: 54 m (177 ft)
- Highest elevation: 104 m (341 ft)
- Lowest elevation: 37 m (121 ft)
- Population (2023): 263
  - Density: 62.9/km^{2} (163/sq mi)
- Time zone: UTC+01:00 (CET)
  - Summer (DST): UTC+02:00 (CEST)
- INSEE/Postal code: 80595 /80110
- ^{1} French Land Register data, which excludes lakes, ponds, glaciers > 1 km^{2} (0.386 sq mi or 247 acres) and river estuaries.

La Neuville-Sire-Bernard (French pronunciation: [la nøvil siʁ bɛʁnaʁ]; Picard: L'Neuville-Sire-Bernard) is a commune in the Somme department in Hauts-de-France in northern France.

== Geography ==
The commune is situated on the D935 road, some 15 miles (24 km) southeast of Amiens, by the banks of the Avre River.

== Population ==
Historical population
Year	Pop.	±% p.a.
1968	123	—
1975	119	−0.47%
1982	157	+4.04%
1990	219	+4.25%
1999	267	+2.23%
2007	271	+0.19%
2012	276	+0.37%
2017	285	+0.64%
2023	263	−1.33%
Source: INSEE

== See also ==
- Communes of the Somme department
