= Braches =

- Commune
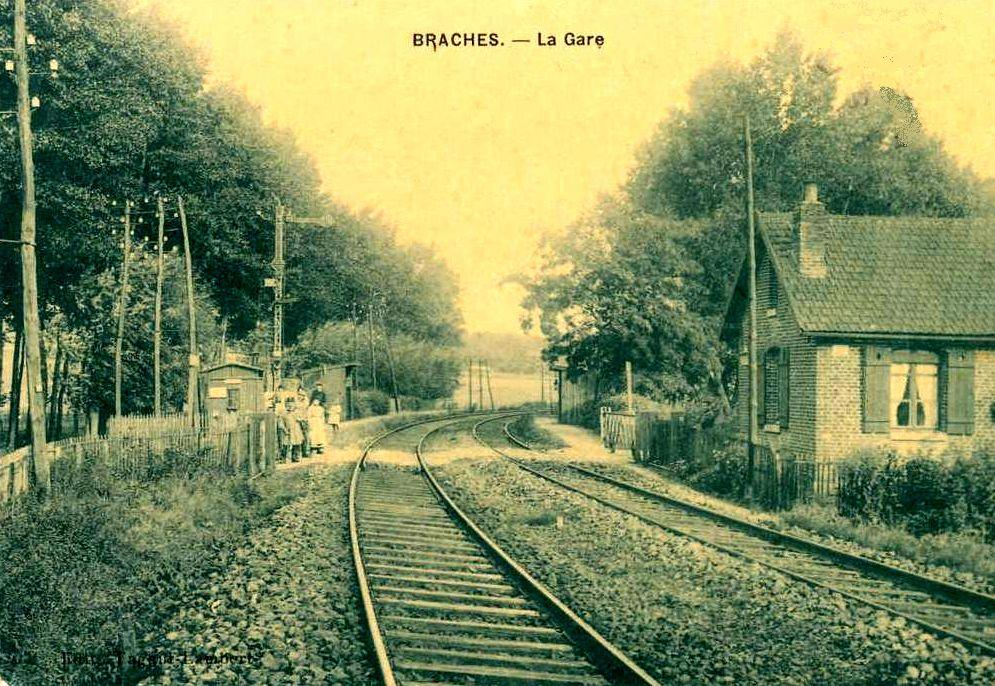
- Braches railway station in the early 20th century
- Location of Braches
- Location within France Location within Hauts-de-France
- Coordinates: 49°44′01″N 2°30′26″E
- Country: France
- Region: Hauts-de-France
- Department: Somme
- Arrondissement: Montdidier
- Canton: Moreuil
- Intercommunality: CC Avre Luce Noye

Government
  - Mayor (2020–2026): Stéphane Delanaud
- Area^{1}: 7.21 km^{2} (2.78 sq mi)
- Elevation: 52 m (171 ft)
- Highest elevation: 112 m (367 ft)
- Lowest elevation: 37 m (121 ft)
- Population (2023): 203
  - Density: 28.2/km^{2} (72.9/sq mi)
- Time zone: UTC+01:00 (CET)
  - Summer (DST): UTC+02:00 (CEST)
- INSEE/Postal code: 80132 /80110
- ^{1} French Land Register data, which excludes lakes, ponds, glaciers > 1 km^{2} (0.386 sq mi or 247 acres) and river estuaries.

Braches (French pronunciation: [bʁaʃ]) is a commune in the Somme department in Hauts-de-France in northern France.

== Geography ==
Braches is situated on the D256 road, some 15 miles (24 km) southeast of Amiens, on the banks of the Avre river.

== Population ==
Historical population
Year	Pop.	±% p.a.
1968	127	—
1975	108	−2.29%
1982	155	+5.30%
1990	185	+2.24%
1999	201	+0.93%
2007	223	+1.31%
2012	218	−0.45%
2017	263	+3.82%
2023	203	−4.22%
Source: INSEE

== See also ==
- Communes of the Somme department
