= Rosières-en-Santerre =

- Commune
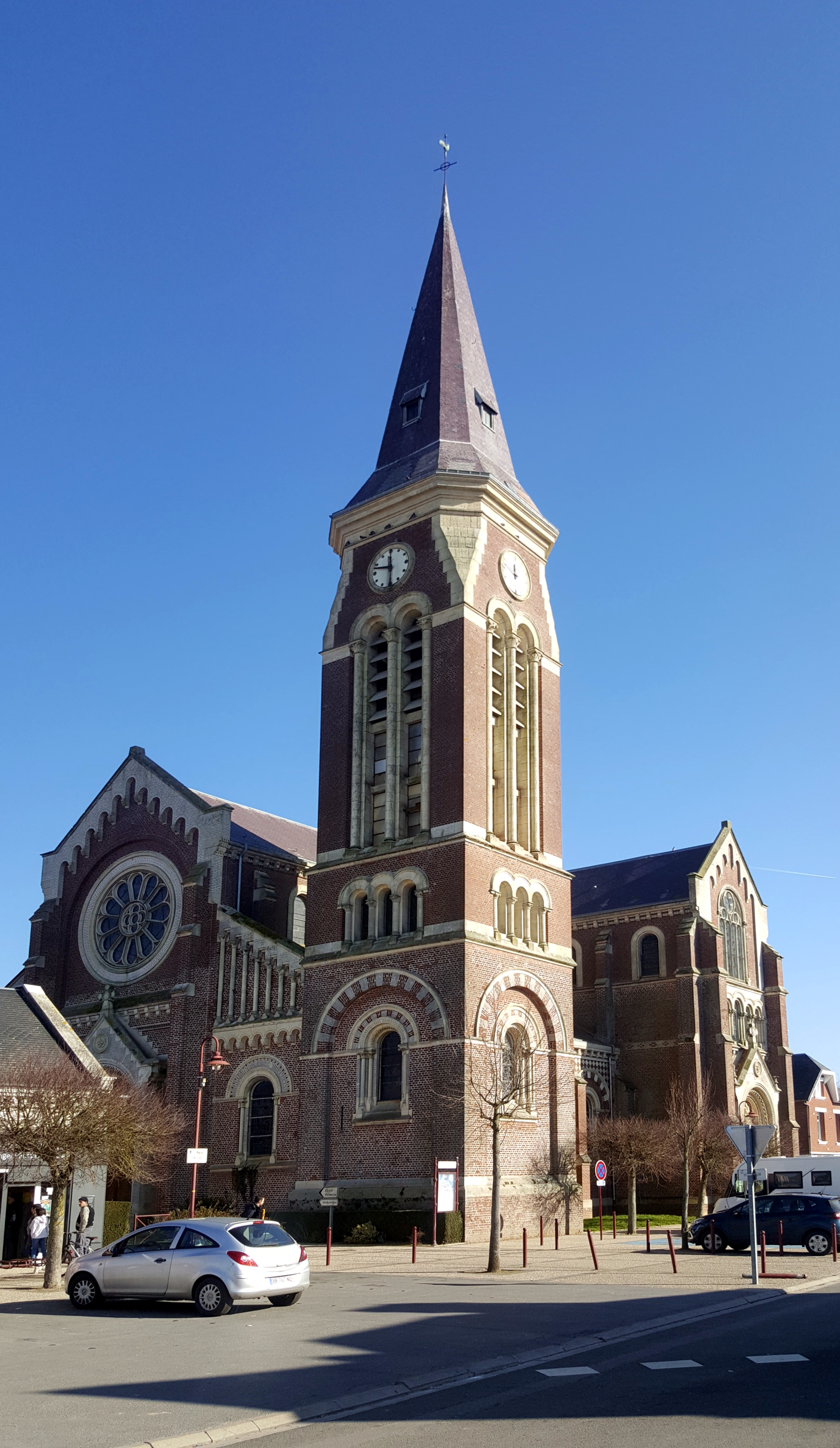
- The church in Rosières-en-Santerre

- Coat of arms
- Location of Rosières-en-Santerre
- Location within France Location within Hauts-de-France
- Coordinates: 49°48′54″N 2°42′11″E
- Country: France
- Region: Hauts-de-France
- Department: Somme
- Arrondissement: Péronne
- Canton: Moreuil
- Intercommunality: CC Terre de Picardie

Government
  - Mayor (2020–2026): Françoise Maille-Barbare
- Area^{1}: 12.98 km^{2} (5.01 sq mi)
- Elevation: 91 m (299 ft)
- Highest elevation: 106 m (348 ft)
- Lowest elevation: 70 m (230 ft)
- Population (2023): 2,894
  - Density: 223.0/km^{2} (577.5/sq mi)
- Time zone: UTC+01:00 (CET)
  - Summer (DST): UTC+02:00 (CEST)
- INSEE/Postal code: 80680 /80170
- ^{1} French Land Register data, which excludes lakes, ponds, glaciers > 1 km^{2} (0.386 sq mi or 247 acres) and river estuaries.

Rosières-en-Santerre (French pronunciation: [ʁozjɛʁ ɑ̃ sɑ̃tɛʁ], literally Rosières in Santerre) is a commune in the Somme department in Hauts-de-France in northern France.

== Geography ==
The commune is situated approximately 20 kilometres (12 mi) southeast of Amiens, at the junction of the D28 and D329 roads. Rosières station has rail connections to Amiens and Laon.

== Population ==
Historical population
Year	Pop.	±% p.a.
1968	2,605	—
1975	2,815	+1.11%
1982	2,985	+0.84%
1990	3,107	+0.50%
1999	2,956	−0.55%
2007	2,877	−0.34%
2012	2,985	+0.74%
2017	3,008	+0.15%
2023	2,894	−0.64%
Source: INSEE

== Places of interest ==
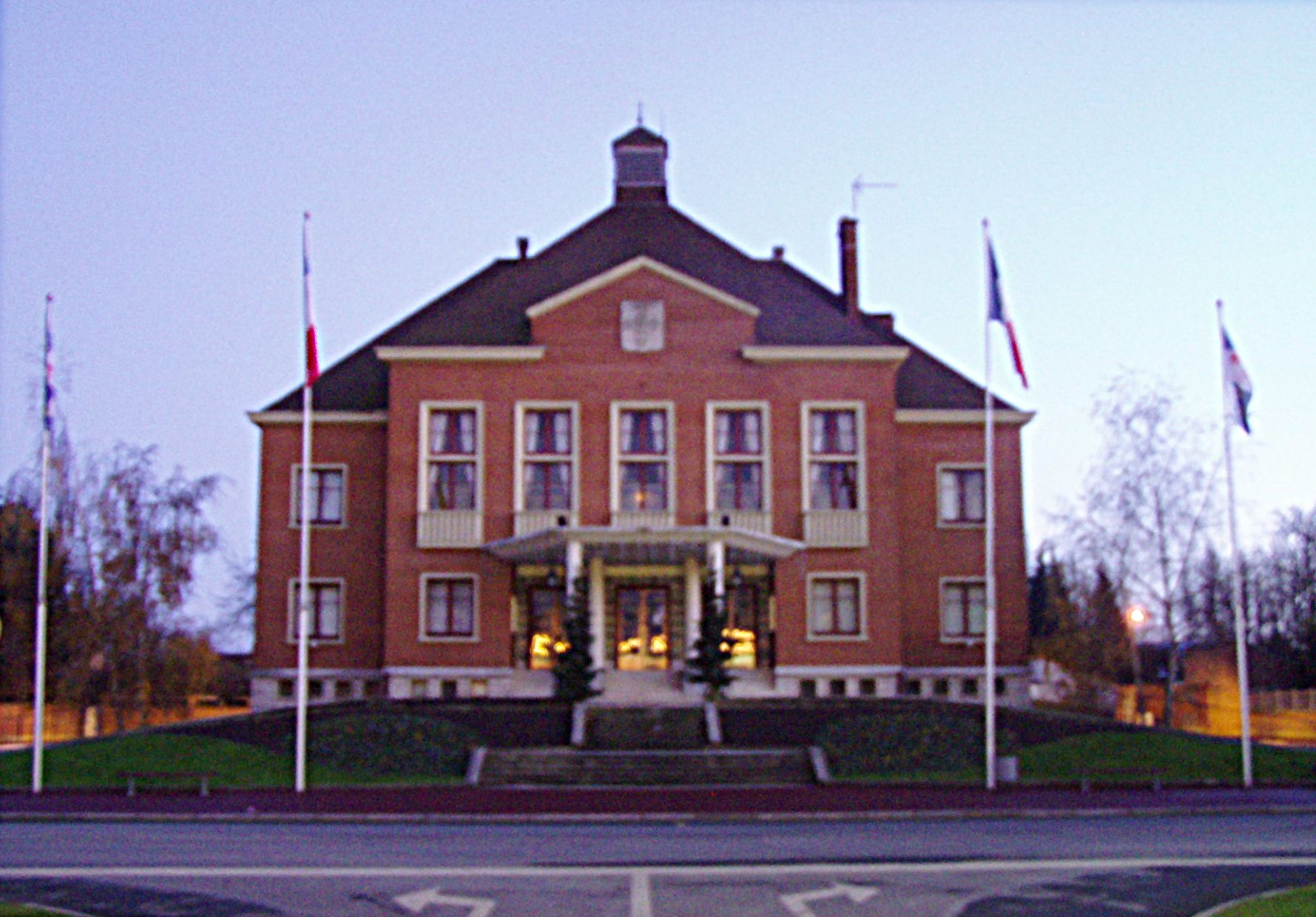
Mairie Rosieres en Santerre in 2005

- Mairie Rosieres en Santerre
- Eglise Rosieres en Santerre

== Twin towns ==
Drochtersen, Germany since 1972

== Notable people ==
Jean-Jacques Perrey - electronic music pioneer

== See also ==
- Communes of the Somme department
