= Wiencourt-l'Équipée =

- Commune
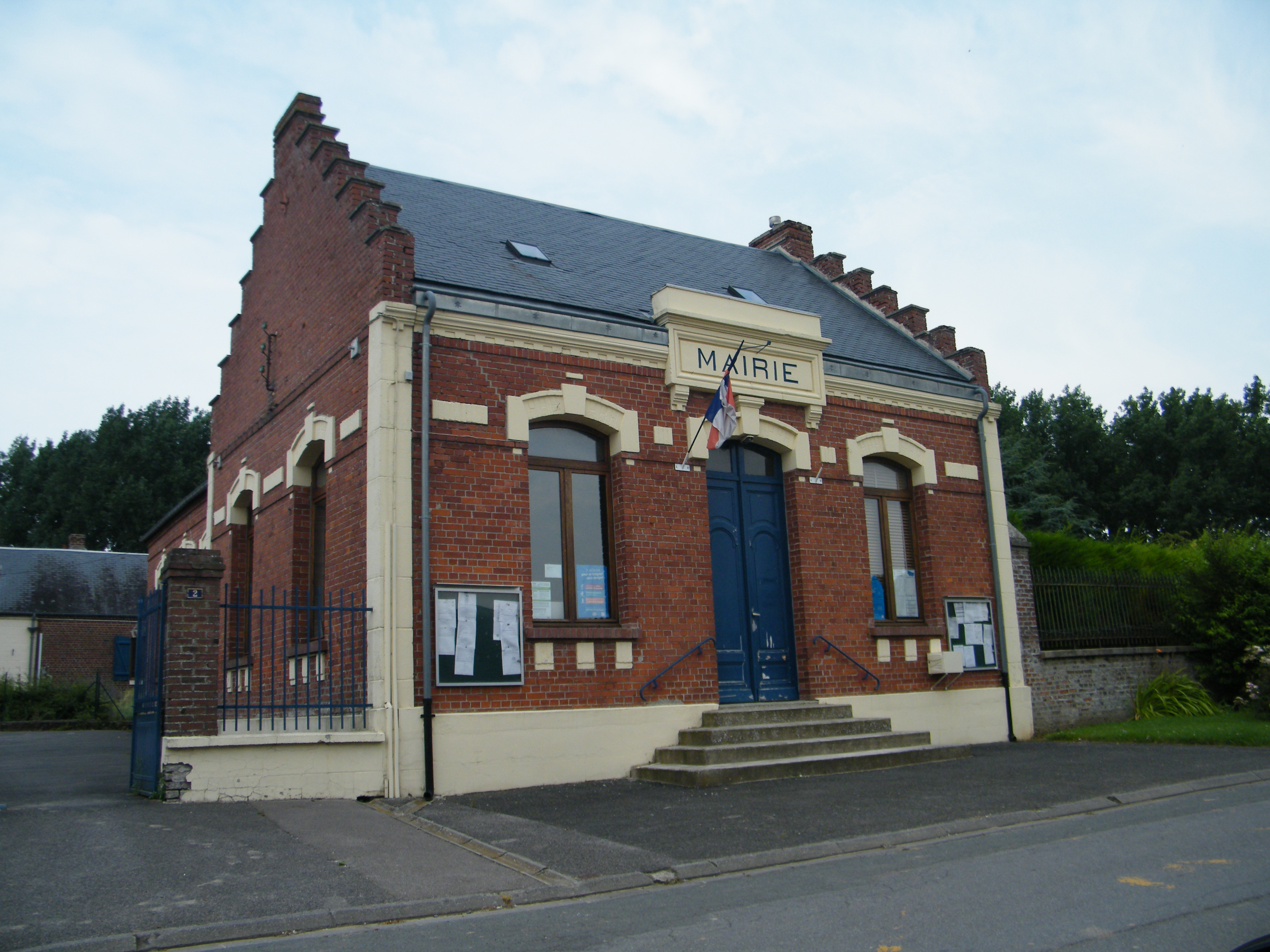
- The town hall in Wiencourt-l'Équipée
- Location of Wiencourt-l'Équipée
- Location within France Location within Hauts-de-France
- Coordinates: 49°50′46″N 2°36′43″E
- Country: France
- Region: Hauts-de-France
- Department: Somme
- Arrondissement: Péronne
- Canton: Moreuil
- Intercommunality: Terre de Picardie

Government
  - Mayor (2020–2026): Gérard Caron
- Area^{1}: 5.86 km^{2} (2.26 sq mi)
- Elevation: 86 m (282 ft)
- Highest elevation: 95 m (312 ft)
- Lowest elevation: 49 m (161 ft)
- Population (2023): 249
  - Density: 42.5/km^{2} (110/sq mi)
- Time zone: UTC+01:00 (CET)
  - Summer (DST): UTC+02:00 (CEST)
- INSEE/Postal code: 80824 /80170
- ^{1} French Land Register data, which excludes lakes, ponds, glaciers > 1 km^{2} (0.386 sq mi or 247 acres) and river estuaries.

Wiencourt-l'Équipée is a commune in the Somme department in Hauts-de-France in northern France.

== Geography ==
The commune is situated 22 km (14 mi) east of Amiens, on the D136 road.

== Population ==
Historical population
Year	Pop.	±% p.a.
1968	238	—
1975	234	−0.24%
1982	190	−2.93%
1990	199	+0.58%
1999	205	+0.33%
2007	248	+2.41%
2012	257	+0.72%
2017	263	+0.46%
2023	249	−0.91%
Source: INSEE

== See also ==
- Communes of the Somme department
