= Aubercourt =

- Commune
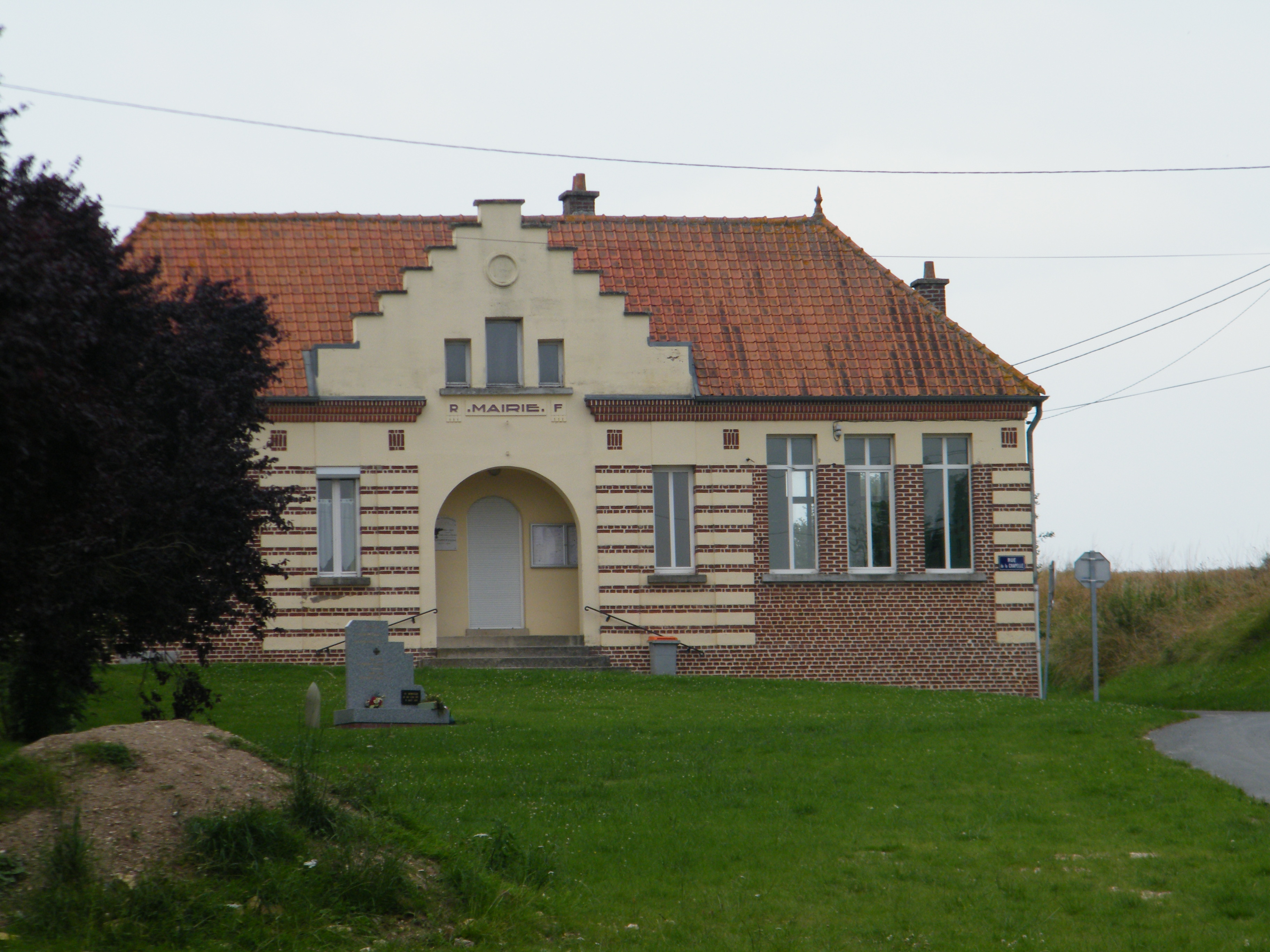
- The town hall in Aubercourt
- Location of Aubercourt
- Location within France Location within Hauts-de-France
- Coordinates: 49°49′40″N 2°32′58″E
- Country: France
- Region: Hauts-de-France
- Department: Somme
- Arrondissement: Montdidier
- Canton: Moreuil
- Intercommunality: CC Avre Luce Noye

Government
  - Mayor (2020–2026): Gilles Charles
- Area^{1}: 3.8 km^{2} (1.5 sq mi)
- Elevation: 52 m (171 ft)
- Highest elevation: 101 m (331 ft)
- Lowest elevation: 45 m (148 ft)
- Population (2023): 69
  - Density: 18/km^{2} (47/sq mi)
- Time zone: UTC+01:00 (CET)
  - Summer (DST): UTC+02:00 (CEST)
- INSEE/Postal code: 80035 /80110
- ^{1} French Land Register data, which excludes lakes, ponds, glaciers > 1 km^{2} (0.386 sq mi or 247 acres) and river estuaries.

Aubercourt is a commune in the Somme department in Hauts-de-France in northern France.

== See also ==
- Communes of the Somme department
