= Le Plessier-Rozainvillers =

- Commune
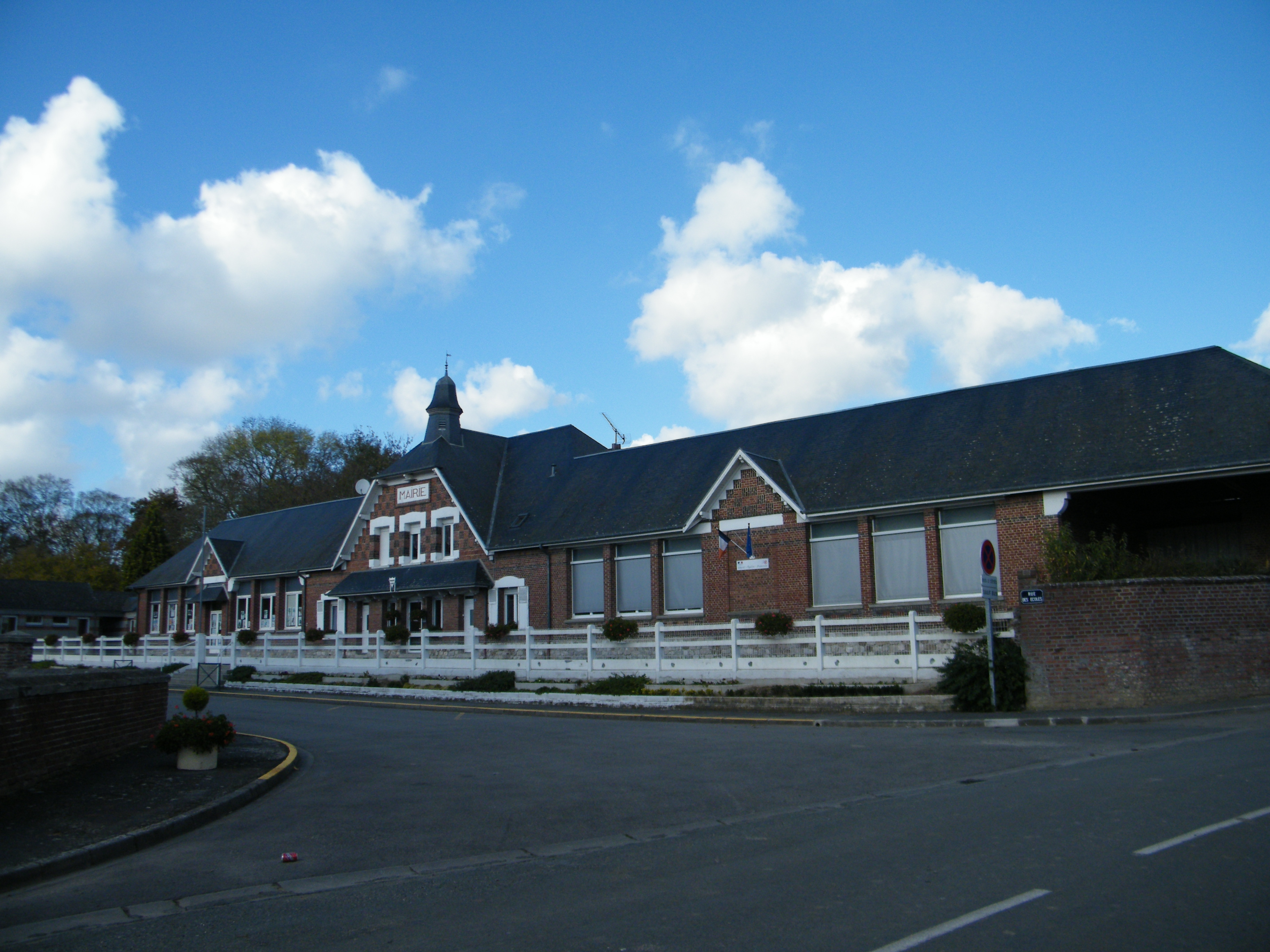
- The town hall and school in Le Plessier-Rozainvillers
- Location of Le Plessier-Rozainvillers
- Location within France Location within Hauts-de-France
- Coordinates: 49°45′03″N 2°33′14″E
- Country: France
- Region: Hauts-de-France
- Department: Somme
- Arrondissement: Montdidier
- Canton: Moreuil
- Intercommunality: CC Avre Luce Noye

Government
  - Mayor (2020–2026): André Lescureux
- Area^{1}: 10.17 km^{2} (3.93 sq mi)
- Elevation: 103 m (338 ft)
- Highest elevation: 109 m (358 ft)
- Lowest elevation: 53 m (174 ft)
- Population (2023): 753
  - Density: 74.0/km^{2} (192/sq mi)
- Time zone: UTC+01:00 (CET)
  - Summer (DST): UTC+02:00 (CEST)
- INSEE/Postal code: 80628 /80110
- ^{1} French Land Register data, which excludes lakes, ponds, glaciers > 1 km^{2} (0.386 sq mi or 247 acres) and river estuaries.

Le Plessier-Rozainvillers is a commune in the Somme department in Hauts-de-France in northern France.

== Geography ==
The commune is situated on the D137 and D54 crossroads, 32 kilometres (20 mi) southeast of Amiens.

== Population ==
Historical population
Year	Pop.	±% p.a.
1968	632	—
1975	624	−0.18%
1982	577	−1.11%
1990	582	+0.11%
1999	566	−0.31%
2007	609	+0.92%
2012	706	+3.00%
2017	755	+1.35%
2023	753	−0.04%
Source: INSEE

== See also ==
- Communes of the Somme department
