= Villers-aux-Érables =

- Commune
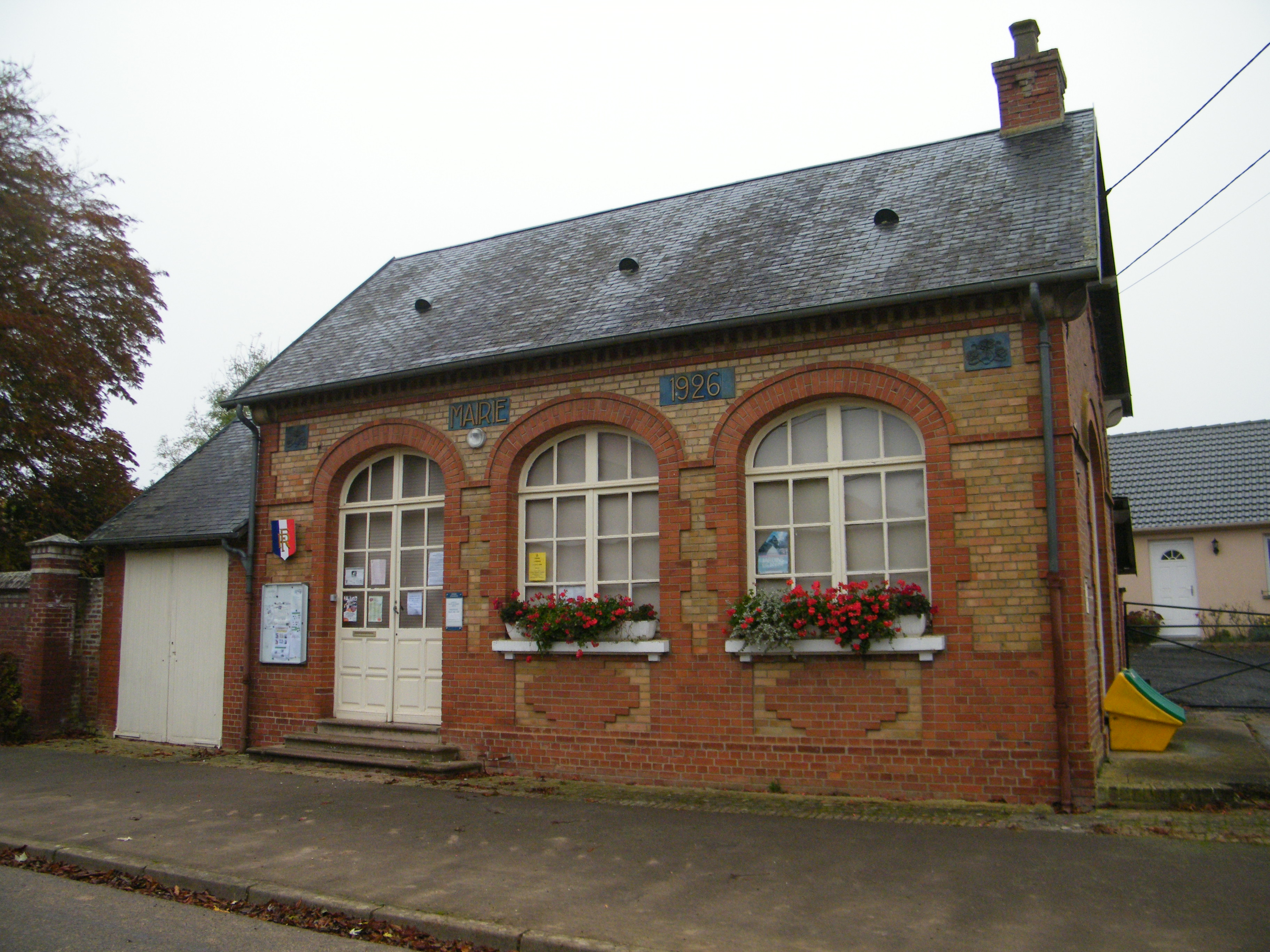
- The town hall in Villers-aux Erables
- Location of Villers-aux-Érables
- Location within France Location within Hauts-de-France
- Coordinates: 49°47′17″N 2°32′16″E
- Country: France
- Region: Hauts-de-France
- Department: Somme
- Arrondissement: Montdidier
- Canton: Moreuil
- Intercommunality: CC Avre Luce Noye

Government
  - Mayor (2020–2026): Miguel Benony
- Area^{1}: 4.34 km^{2} (1.68 sq mi)
- Elevation: 105 m (344 ft)
- Highest elevation: 106 m (348 ft)
- Lowest elevation: 87 m (285 ft)
- Population (2023): 137
  - Density: 31.6/km^{2} (81.8/sq mi)
- Time zone: UTC+01:00 (CET)
  - Summer (DST): UTC+02:00 (CEST)
- INSEE/Postal code: 80797 /80110
- ^{1} French Land Register data, which excludes lakes, ponds, glaciers > 1 km^{2} (0.386 sq mi or 247 acres) and river estuaries.

Villers-aux-Érables is a commune in the Somme department in Hauts-de-France in northern France.

== Geography ==
The commune is situated 24 kilometres (15 mi) southeast of Amiens, on the D28 road.

== Population ==
Historical population
Year	Pop.	±% p.a.
1968	106	—
1975	98	−1.11%
1982	94	−0.59%
1990	96	+0.26%
1999	104	+0.89%
2007	129	+2.73%
2012	136	+1.06%
2017	127	−1.36%
2023	137	+1.27%
Source: INSEE

== See also ==
- Communes of the Somme department
