= Cayeux-en-Santerre =

- Commune
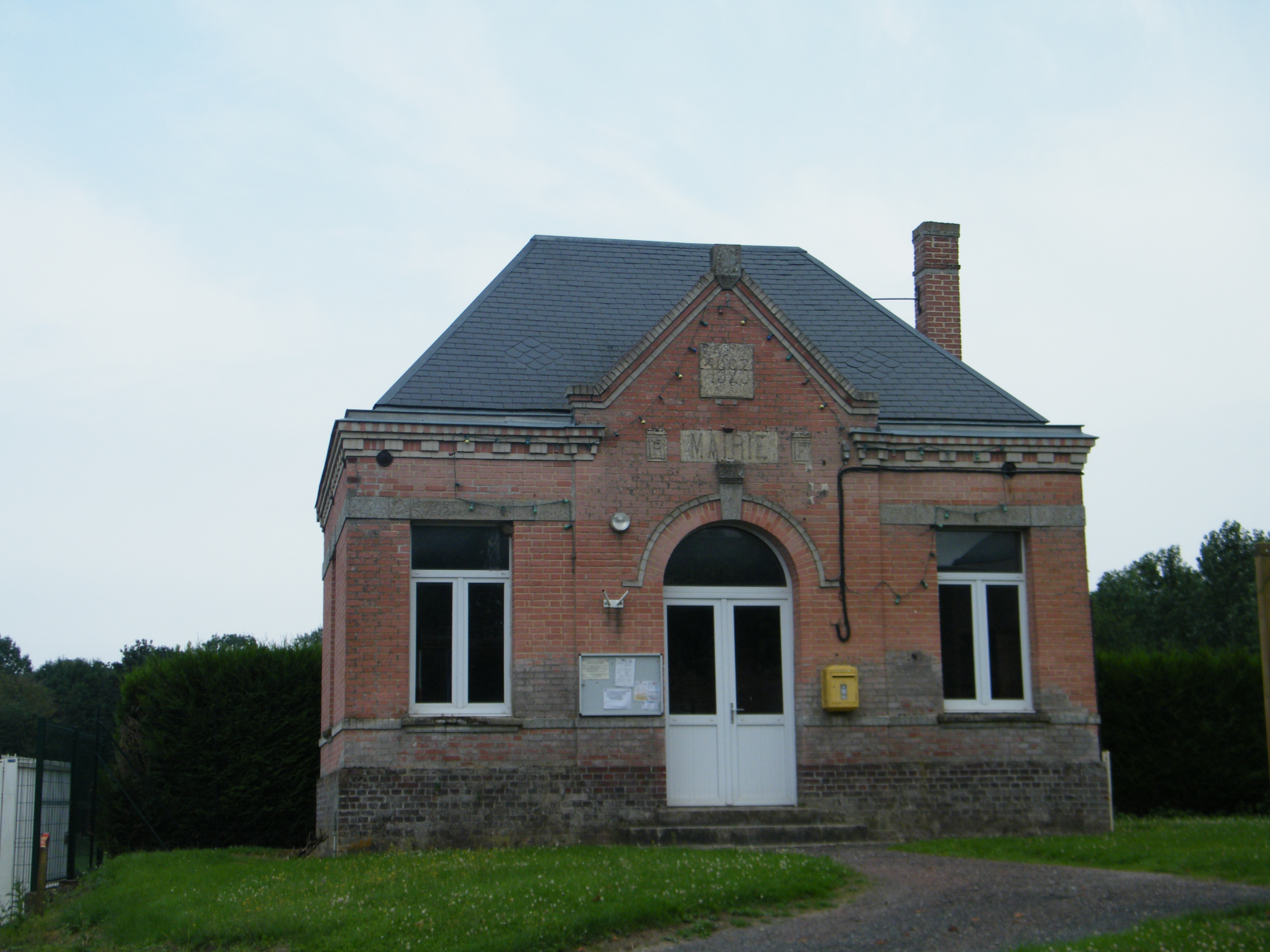
- The town hall in Cayeux-en-Santerre
- Location of Cayeux-en-Santerre
- Location within France Location within Hauts-de-France
- Coordinates: 49°49′17″N 2°36′00″E
- Country: France
- Region: Hauts-de-France
- Department: Somme
- Arrondissement: Montdidier
- Canton: Moreuil
- Intercommunality: CC Avre Luce Noye

Government
  - Mayor (2020–2026): Hélène Attagnant
- Area^{1}: 5.44 km^{2} (2.10 sq mi)
- Elevation: 55 m (180 ft)
- Highest elevation: 96 m (315 ft)
- Lowest elevation: 49 m (161 ft)
- Population (2023): 123
  - Density: 22.6/km^{2} (58.6/sq mi)
- Time zone: UTC+01:00 (CET)
  - Summer (DST): UTC+02:00 (CEST)
- INSEE/Postal code: 80181 /80800
- ^{1} French Land Register data, which excludes lakes, ponds, glaciers > 1 km^{2} (0.386 sq mi or 247 acres) and river estuaries.

Cayeux-en-Santerre (Picard: Tchéyu-in-Santérre) is a commune in the Somme department in Hauts-de-France in northern France.

== Geography ==
The commune is situated on the D76 road, some 25 miles (40 km) southeast of Amiens.

== Population ==
Historical population
Year	Pop.	±% p.a.
1968	101	—
1975	87	−2.11%
1982	84	−0.50%
1990	87	+0.44%
1999	79	−1.07%
2007	88	+1.36%
2012	122	+6.75%
2017	121	−0.16%
2023	123	+0.27%
Source: INSEE

== See also ==
- Communes of the Somme department
