= La Chavatte =

- Commune
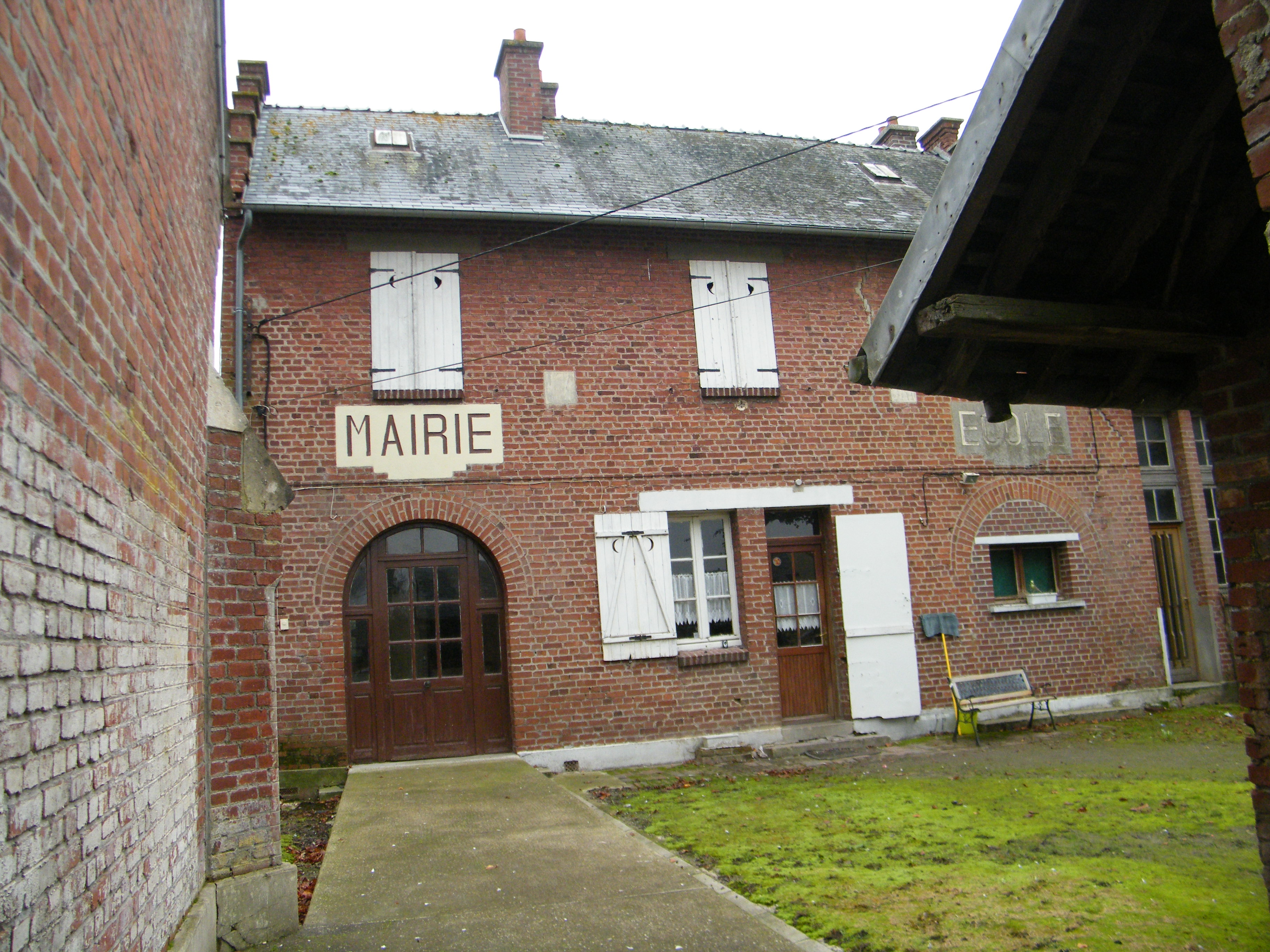
- The town hall in La Chavatte
- Location of La Chavatte
- Location within France Location within Hauts-de-France
- Coordinates: 49°45′27″N 2°46′03″E
- Country: France
- Region: Hauts-de-France
- Department: Somme
- Arrondissement: Péronne
- Canton: Moreuil
- Intercommunality: CC Terre de Picardie

Government
  - Mayor (2024–2026): Karine Verqueren
- Area^{1}: 1.89 km^{2} (0.73 sq mi)
- Elevation: 80 m (260 ft)
- Highest elevation: 95 m (312 ft)
- Lowest elevation: 84 m (276 ft)
- Population (2023): 60
  - Density: 32/km^{2} (82/sq mi)
- Time zone: UTC+01:00 (CET)
  - Summer (DST): UTC+02:00 (CEST)
- INSEE/Postal code: 80189 /80700
- ^{1} French Land Register data, which excludes lakes, ponds, glaciers > 1 km^{2} (0.386 sq mi or 247 acres) and river estuaries.

La Chavatte (French pronunciation: [la ʃavat]; Picard: L’Chavate) is a commune in the Somme department in Hauts-de-France in northern France.

== Geography ==
La Chavatte is situated on the D161 road, some 50 km (31 mi) southeast of Amiens.

== Population ==
Historical population
Year	Pop.	±% p.a.
1968	48	—
1975	40	−2.57%
1982	28	−4.97%
1990	40	+4.56%
1999	39	−0.28%
2007	54	+4.15%
2012	72	+5.92%
2017	73	+0.28%
2023	60	−3.22%
Source: INSEE

== See also ==
- Communes of the Somme department
- Réseau des Bains de Mer
