= Hallu =

- Commune
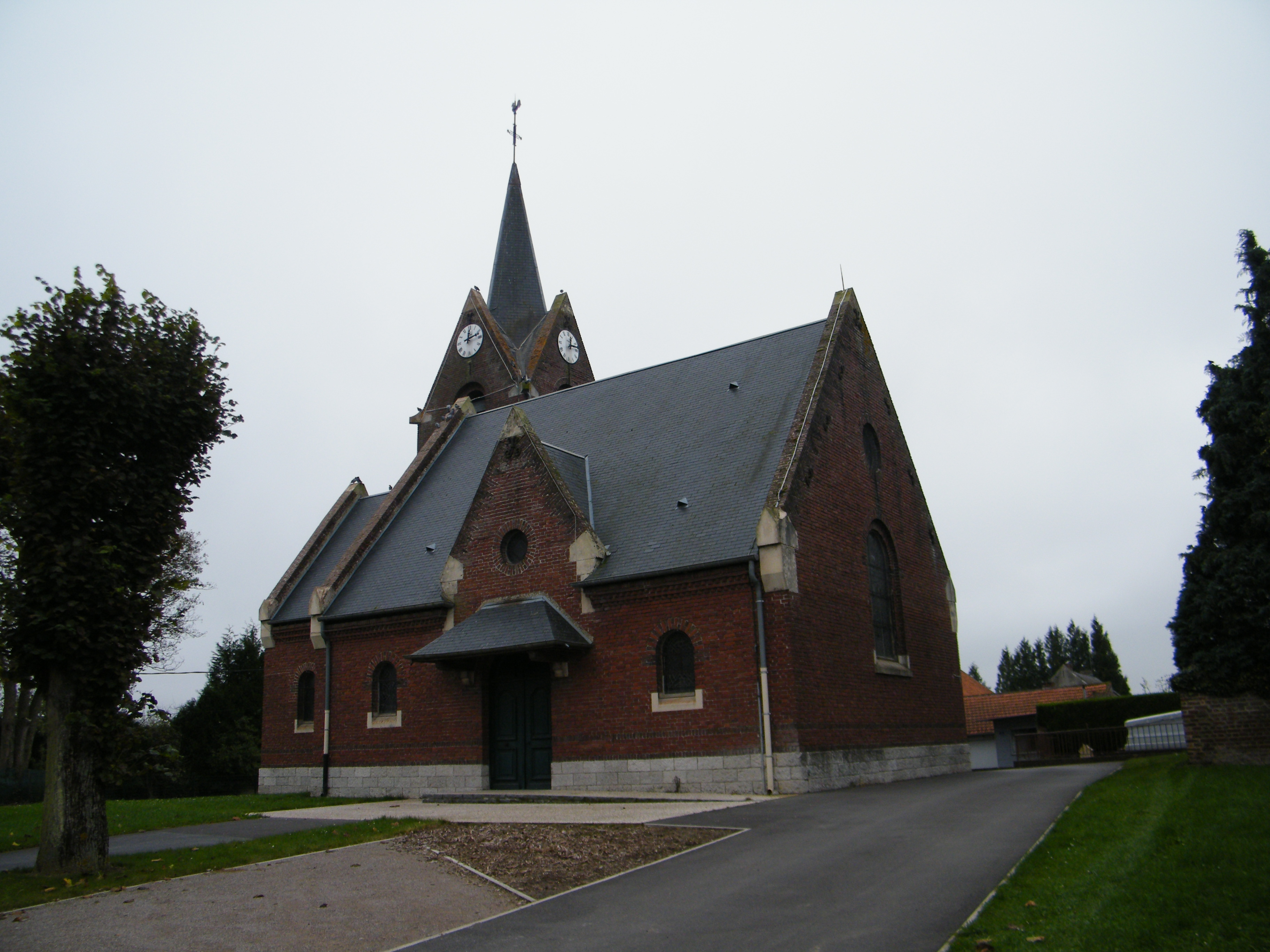
- The church in Hallu
- Location of Hallu
- Location within France Location within Hauts-de-France
- Coordinates: 49°47′37″N 2°47′23″E
- Country: France
- Region: Hauts-de-France
- Department: Somme
- Arrondissement: Péronne
- Canton: Moreuil
- Intercommunality: CC Terre de Picardie

Government
  - Mayor (2020–2026): Patrice Vallée
- Area^{1}: 3.85 km^{2} (1.49 sq mi)
- Elevation: 83 m (272 ft)
- Highest elevation: 91 m (299 ft)
- Lowest elevation: 76 m (249 ft)
- Population (2023): 143
  - Density: 37.1/km^{2} (96.2/sq mi)
- Time zone: UTC+01:00 (CET)
  - Summer (DST): UTC+02:00 (CEST)
- INSEE/Postal code: 80409 /80320
- ^{1} French Land Register data, which excludes lakes, ponds, glaciers > 1 km^{2} (0.386 sq mi or 247 acres) and river estuaries.

Hallu (French pronunciation: [aly]) is a commune in the Somme department in Hauts-de-France in northern France.

== Geography ==
Hallu is situated on the D39 road, some 26 miles (42 km) southeast of Amiens, just a few hundred yards from the A1 autoroute.

== Population ==
Historical population
Year	Pop.	±% p.a.
1968	137	—
1975	108	−3.34%
1982	110	+0.26%
1990	121	+1.20%
1999	154	+2.72%
2007	171	+1.32%
2012	178	+0.81%
2017	177	−0.11%
2023	143	−3.49%
Source: INSEE

== See also ==
- Communes of the Somme department
