= Bouchoir =

- Commune
- Coat of arms
- Location of Bouchoir
- Location within France Location within Hauts-de-France
- Coordinates: 49°44′57″N 2°40′28″E
- Country: France
- Region: Hauts-de-France
- Department: Somme
- Arrondissement: Péronne
- Canton: Moreuil
- Intercommunality: CC Terre de Picardie

Government
  - Mayor (2020–2026): Magali Crappier
- Area^{1}: 5.88 km^{2} (2.27 sq mi)
- Elevation: 100 m (330 ft)
- Highest elevation: 106 m (348 ft)
- Lowest elevation: 96 m (315 ft)
- Population (2023): 276
  - Density: 46.9/km^{2} (122/sq mi)
- Time zone: UTC+01:00 (CET)
  - Summer (DST): UTC+02:00 (CEST)
- INSEE/Postal code: 80116 /80910
- ^{1} French Land Register data, which excludes lakes, ponds, glaciers > 1 km^{2} (0.386 sq mi or 247 acres) and river estuaries.

Bouchoir (French pronunciation: [buʃwaʁ]) is a commune in the Somme department in Hauts-de-France in northern France.

== Geography ==
Bouchoir is situated on the D329 junction with the D934 road, some 22 miles (35 km) southwest of Amiens.

== History ==
The village of Bouchoir passed into German hands on 27 March 1918 but was recovered by the 8th Canadian Infantry Brigade on 9 August 1918. The New British Cemetery was created just after Armistice to bury the dead from villages south of Bouchoir and the battlefields around it. It contains 763 burials from the First World War and was designed by Sir Herbert Baker.

== Population ==
Historical population
Year	Pop.	±% p.a.
1968	295	—
1975	195	−5.74%
1982	201	+0.43%
1990	222	+1.25%
1999	226	+0.20%
2007	268	+2.15%
2012	302	+2.42%
2017	293	−0.60%
2023	276	−0.99%
Source: INSEE

== See also ==
- Communes of the Somme department
