= Maucourt, Somme =

Maucourt
- Commune
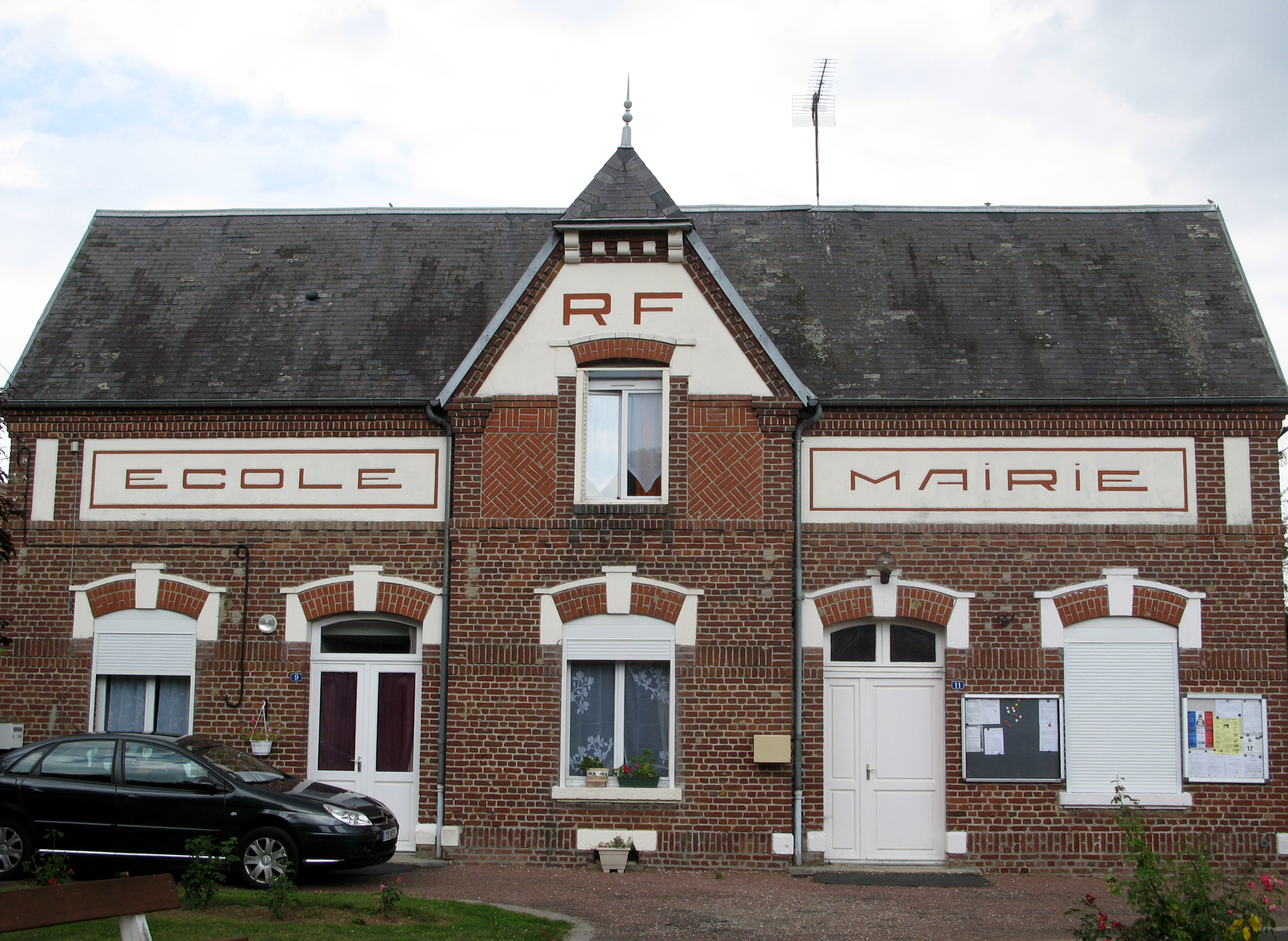
- The town hall in Maucourt
- Location of Maucourt
- Location within France Location within Hauts-de-France
- Coordinates: 49°47′39″N 2°45′19″E
- Country: France
- Region: Hauts-de-France
- Department: Somme
- Arrondissement: Péronne
- Canton: Moreuil
- Intercommunality: CC Terre de Picardie

Government
  - Mayor (2020–2026): Fabrice Massias
- Area^{1}: 3.68 km^{2} (1.42 sq mi)
- Elevation: 91 m (299 ft)
- Highest elevation: 94 m (308 ft)
- Lowest elevation: 86 m (282 ft)
- Population (2023): 205
  - Density: 55.7/km^{2} (144/sq mi)
- Time zone: UTC+01:00 (CET)
  - Summer (DST): UTC+02:00 (CEST)
- INSEE/Postal code: 80520 /80170
- ^{1} French Land Register data, which excludes lakes, ponds, glaciers > 1 km^{2} (0.386 sq mi or 247 acres) and river estuaries.

Maucourt (French pronunciation: [mokuʁ]) is a commune in the Somme department and Hauts-de-France region of northern France.

== Geography ==
Maucourt is situated on the D39 road, about 35 km east-south-east of Amiens.

== Population ==
Historical population
Year	Pop.	±% p.a.
1968	118	—
1975	102	−2.06%
1982	87	−2.25%
1990	107	+2.62%
1999	152	+3.98%
2007	150	−0.17%
2012	164	+1.80%
2017	180	+1.88%
2023	205	+2.19%
Source: INSEE

== See also ==
- Communes of the Somme department
