= Folies =

- Commune
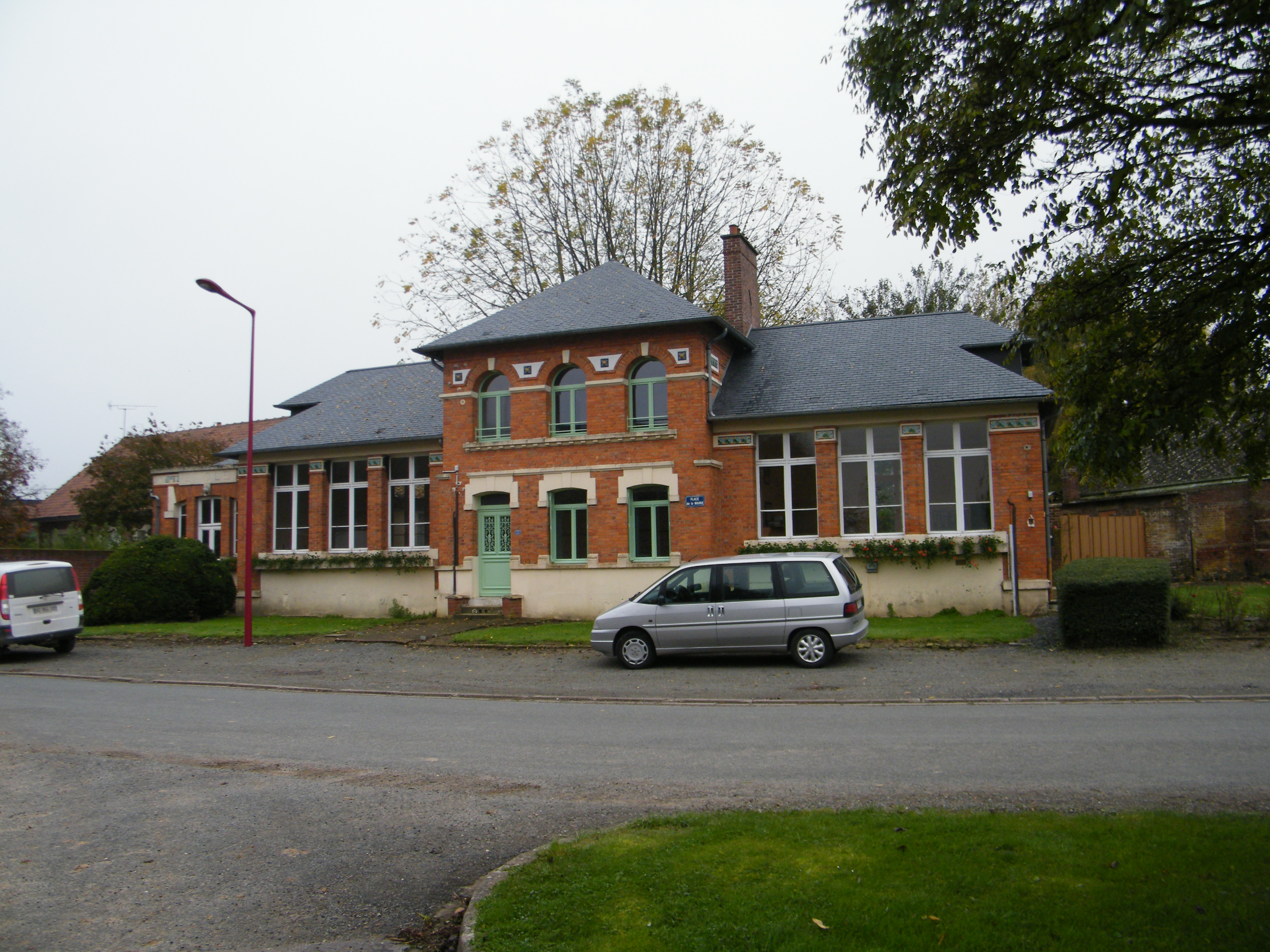
- The town hall and school in Folies
- Location of Folies
- Location within France Location within Hauts-de-France
- Coordinates: 49°45′40″N 2°40′21″E
- Country: France
- Region: Hauts-de-France
- Department: Somme
- Arrondissement: Péronne
- Canton: Moreuil
- Intercommunality: CC Terre de Picardie

Government
  - Mayor (2020–2026): Pierre Kaczmarek
- Area^{1}: 5.63 km^{2} (2.17 sq mi)
- Elevation: 101 m (331 ft)
- Highest elevation: 106 m (348 ft)
- Lowest elevation: 92 m (302 ft)
- Population (2023): 152
  - Density: 27.0/km^{2} (69.9/sq mi)
- Time zone: UTC+01:00 (CET)
  - Summer (DST): UTC+02:00 (CEST)
- INSEE/Postal code: 80320 /80170
- ^{1} French Land Register data, which excludes lakes, ponds, glaciers > 1 km^{2} (0.386 sq mi or 247 acres) and river estuaries.

Folies (French pronunciation: [fɔli]; Picard: Foulies) is a commune in the Somme department in Hauts-de-France in northern France.

== Geography ==
Folies is situated on the D329 road, some 23 miles (37 km) southeast of Amiens.

== Population ==
Historical population
Year	Pop.	±% p.a.
1968	102	—
1975	106	+0.55%
1982	85	−3.10%
1990	88	+0.43%
1999	86	−0.26%
2007	114	+3.59%
2012	131	+2.82%
2017	146	+2.19%
2023	152	+0.67%
Source: INSEE

== See also ==
- Communes of the Somme department
