= Chilly, Somme =

Chilly
- Commune
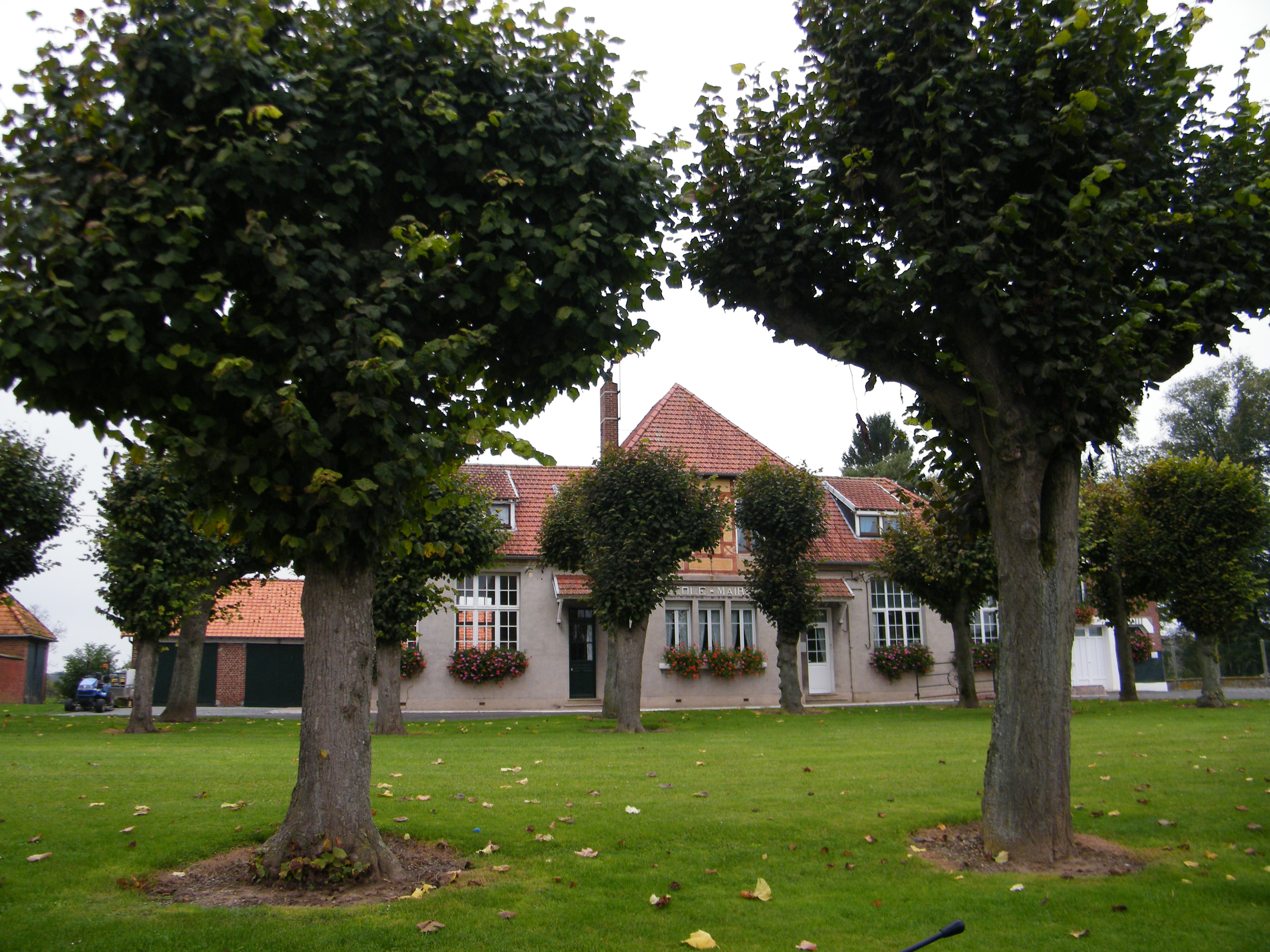
- The town hall and school in Chilly
- Location of Chilly
- Location within France Location within Hauts-de-France
- Coordinates: 49°47′42″N 2°46′04″E
- Country: France
- Region: Hauts-de-France
- Department: Somme
- Arrondissement: Péronne
- Canton: Moreuil
- Intercommunality: CC Terre de Picardie

Government
  - Mayor (2020–2026): Denis Pechon
- Area^{1}: 4.85 km^{2} (1.87 sq mi)
- Elevation: 91 m (299 ft)
- Highest elevation: 93 m (305 ft)
- Lowest elevation: 78 m (256 ft)
- Population (2023): 169
  - Density: 34.8/km^{2} (90.2/sq mi)
- Time zone: UTC+01:00 (CET)
  - Summer (DST): UTC+02:00 (CEST)
- INSEE/Postal code: 80191 /80170
- ^{1} French Land Register data, which excludes lakes, ponds, glaciers > 1 km^{2} (0.386 sq mi or 247 acres) and river estuaries.

Chilly is a commune in the Somme department in Hauts-de-France in northern France.

== Geography ==
Chilly is situated on the D39 road, some 43 km (27 mi) southeast of Amiens.

== Population ==
Historical population
Year	Pop.	±% p.a.
1968	147	—
1975	103	−4.95%
1982	107	+0.55%
1990	128	+2.27%
1999	166	+2.93%
2007	168	+0.15%
2012	202	+3.75%
2017	183	−1.96%
2023	169	−1.32%
Source: INSEE

== See also ==
- Communes of the Somme department
