= Warvillers =

- Commune
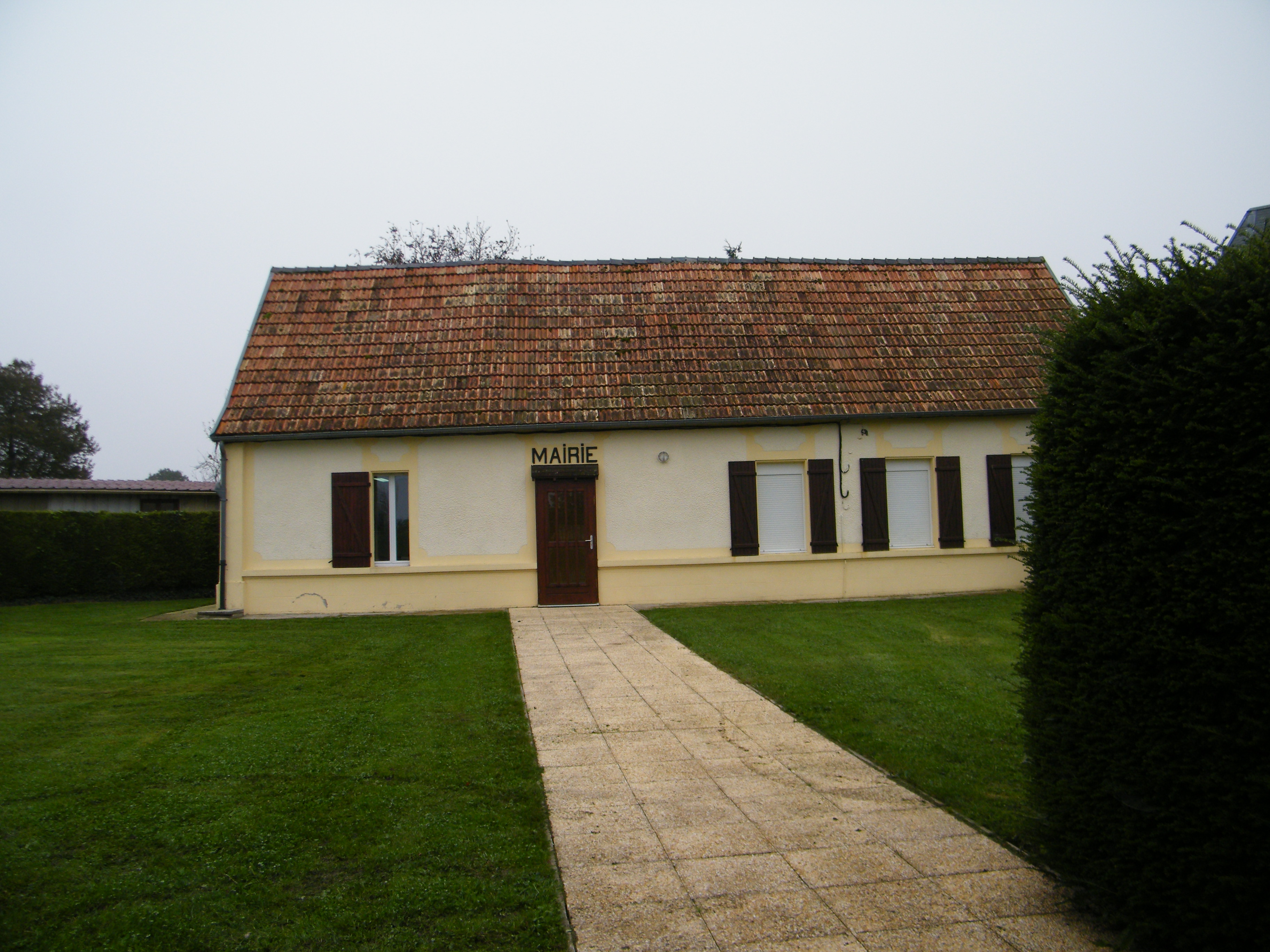
- The town hall in Warvillers
- Location of Warvillers
- Location within France Location within Hauts-de-France
- Coordinates: 49°46′50″N 2°41′16″E
- Country: France
- Region: Hauts-de-France
- Department: Somme
- Arrondissement: Péronne
- Canton: Moreuil
- Intercommunality: Terre de Picardie

Government
  - Mayor (2020–2026): Jean de Lamarlière
- Area^{1}: 4.18 km^{2} (1.61 sq mi)
- Elevation: 100 m (330 ft)
- Highest elevation: 99 m (325 ft)
- Lowest elevation: 92 m (302 ft)
- Population (2023): 121
  - Density: 28.9/km^{2} (75.0/sq mi)
- Time zone: UTC+01:00 (CET)
  - Summer (DST): UTC+02:00 (CEST)
- INSEE/Postal code: 80823 /80170
- ^{1} French Land Register data, which excludes lakes, ponds, glaciers > 1 km^{2} (0.386 sq mi or 247 acres) and river estuaries.

Warvillers is a commune in the Somme department in Hauts-de-France in northern France.

== Geography ==
Warvillers is situated 21 miles(33 km) southeast of Amiens, on the D329 road

== Population ==
Historical population
Year	Pop.	±% p.a.
1968	103	—
1975	108	+0.68%
1982	72	−5.63%
1990	86	+2.25%
1999	104	+2.13%
2007	121	+1.91%
2012	139	+2.81%
2017	150	+1.53%
2023	121	−3.52%
Source: INSEE

== See also ==
- Communes of the Somme department
