= Fransart =

- Commune
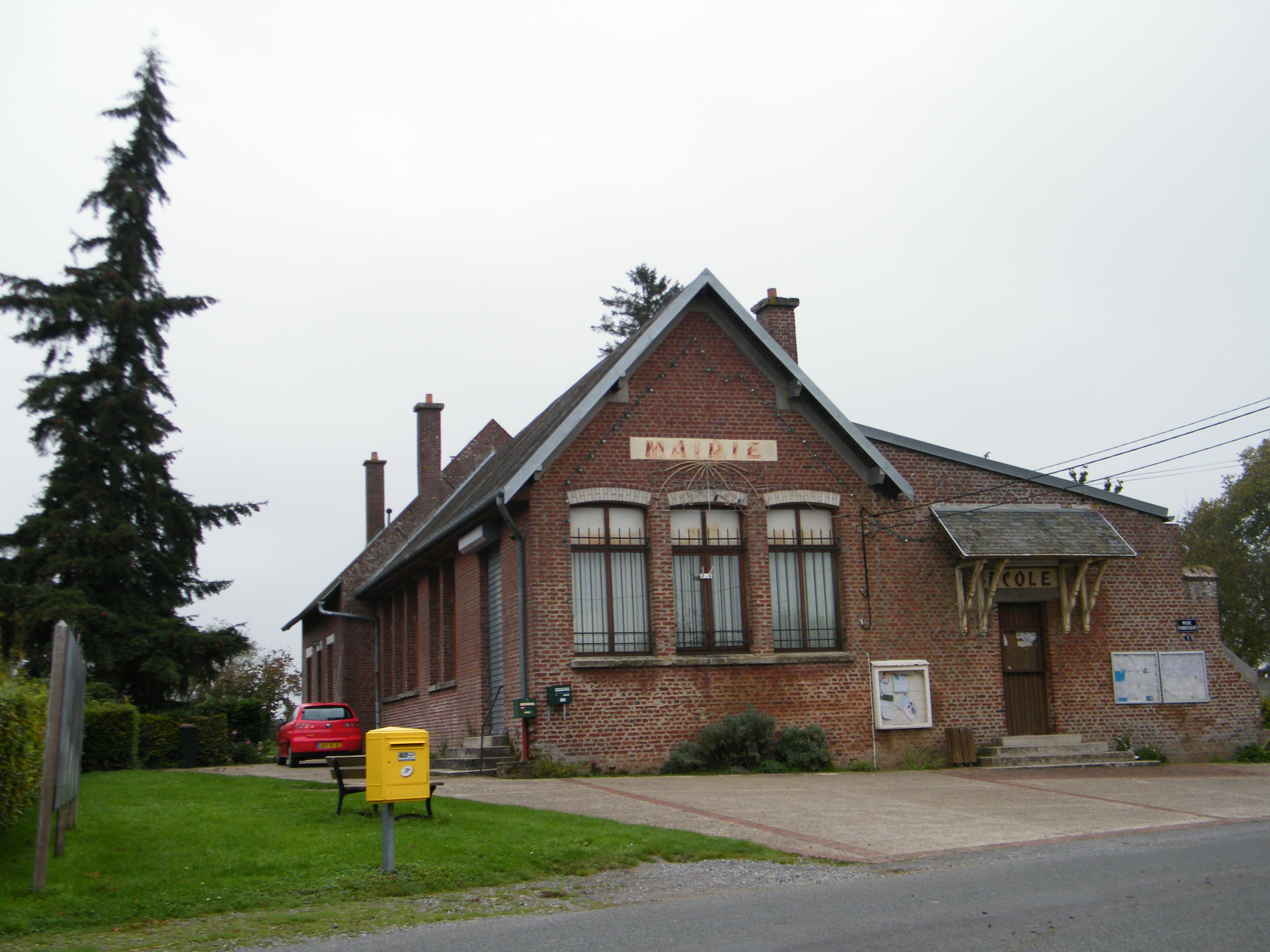
- The town hall in Fransart
- Location of Fransart
- Location within France Location within Hauts-de-France
- Coordinates: 49°46′05″N 2°46′27″E
- Country: France
- Region: Hauts-de-France
- Department: Somme
- Arrondissement: Péronne
- Canton: Moreuil
- Intercommunality: CC Terre de Picardie

Government
  - Mayor (2020–2026): Raymond Nieto
- Area^{1}: 3 km^{2} (1.2 sq mi)
- Elevation: 88 m (289 ft)
- Highest elevation: 94 m (308 ft)
- Lowest elevation: 84 m (276 ft)
- Population (2023): 163
  - Density: 54/km^{2} (140/sq mi)
- Time zone: UTC+01:00 (CET)
  - Summer (DST): UTC+02:00 (CEST)
- INSEE/Postal code: 80347 /80700
- ^{1} French Land Register data, which excludes lakes, ponds, glaciers > 1 km^{2} (0.386 sq mi or 247 acres) and river estuaries.

Fransart (French pronunciation: [fʁɑ̃saʁ]) is a commune in the Somme department in Hauts-de-France in northern France.

== Geography ==
Fransart is situated 20 miles (32 km) southeast of Amiens just by the D161 road, not far from the A1 autoroute

== Population ==
Historical population
Year	Pop.	±% p.a.
1968	117	—
1975	90	−3.68%
1982	106	+2.37%
1990	116	+1.13%
1999	121	+0.47%
2007	140	+1.84%
2012	155	+2.06%
2017	151	−0.52%
2023	163	+1.28%
Source: INSEE

== See also ==
- Communes of the Somme department
