= Caix =

- Commune
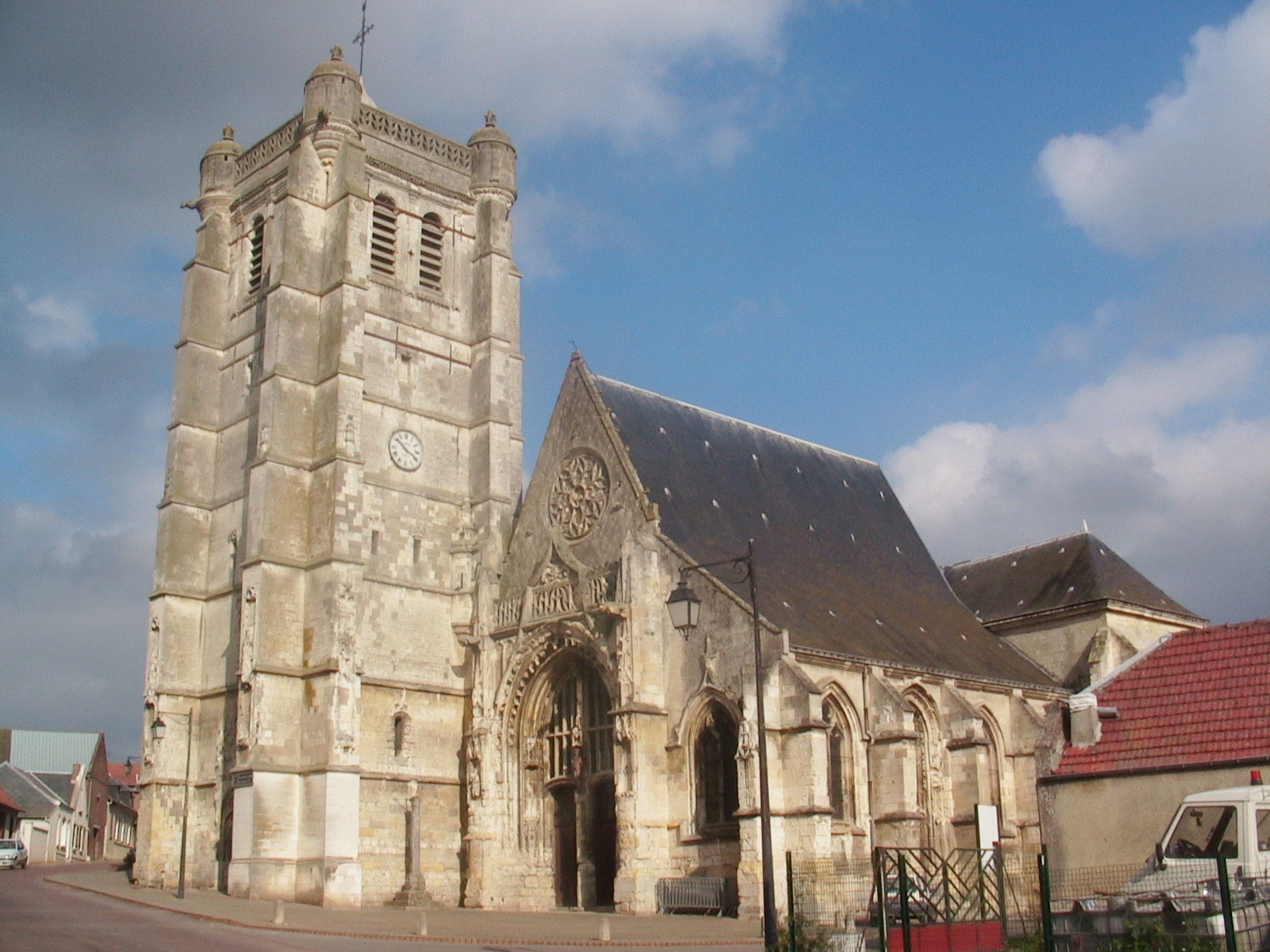
- The church in Caix
- Location of Caix
- Location within France Location within Hauts-de-France
- Coordinates: 49°49′02″N 2°38′47″E
- Country: France
- Region: Hauts-de-France
- Department: Somme
- Arrondissement: Péronne
- Canton: Moreuil
- Intercommunality: CC Terre de Picardie

Government
  - Mayor (2023–2026): Jean-Michel Sailly
- Area^{1}: 11.95 km^{2} (4.61 sq mi)
- Elevation: 90 m (300 ft)
- Highest elevation: 97 m (318 ft)
- Lowest elevation: 53 m (174 ft)
- Population (2023): 704
  - Density: 58.9/km^{2} (153/sq mi)
- Time zone: UTC+01:00 (CET)
  - Summer (DST): UTC+02:00 (CEST)
- INSEE/Postal code: 80162 /80170
- ^{1} French Land Register data, which excludes lakes, ponds, glaciers > 1 km^{2} (0.386 sq mi or 247 acres) and river estuaries.

Caix (French pronunciation: [kɛ]; Picard: Tchai) is a commune in the Somme department in Hauts-de-France in northern France. Its 13th-16th century church is a listed monument.

== Geography ==
Caix is situated on the D28 road, some 20 miles (32 km) southeast of Amiens.

== First World War ==
In the First World War Caix was under German occupation for most of the period. It was recaptured by the 1st Canadian Division on 8 August 1918.

== Population ==
Historical population
Year	Pop.	±% p.a.
1968	722	—
1975	650	−1.49%
1982	611	−0.88%
1990	621	+0.20%
1999	658	+0.65%
2007	711	+0.97%
2012	744	+0.91%
2017	740	−0.11%
2023	704	−0.83%
Source: INSEE

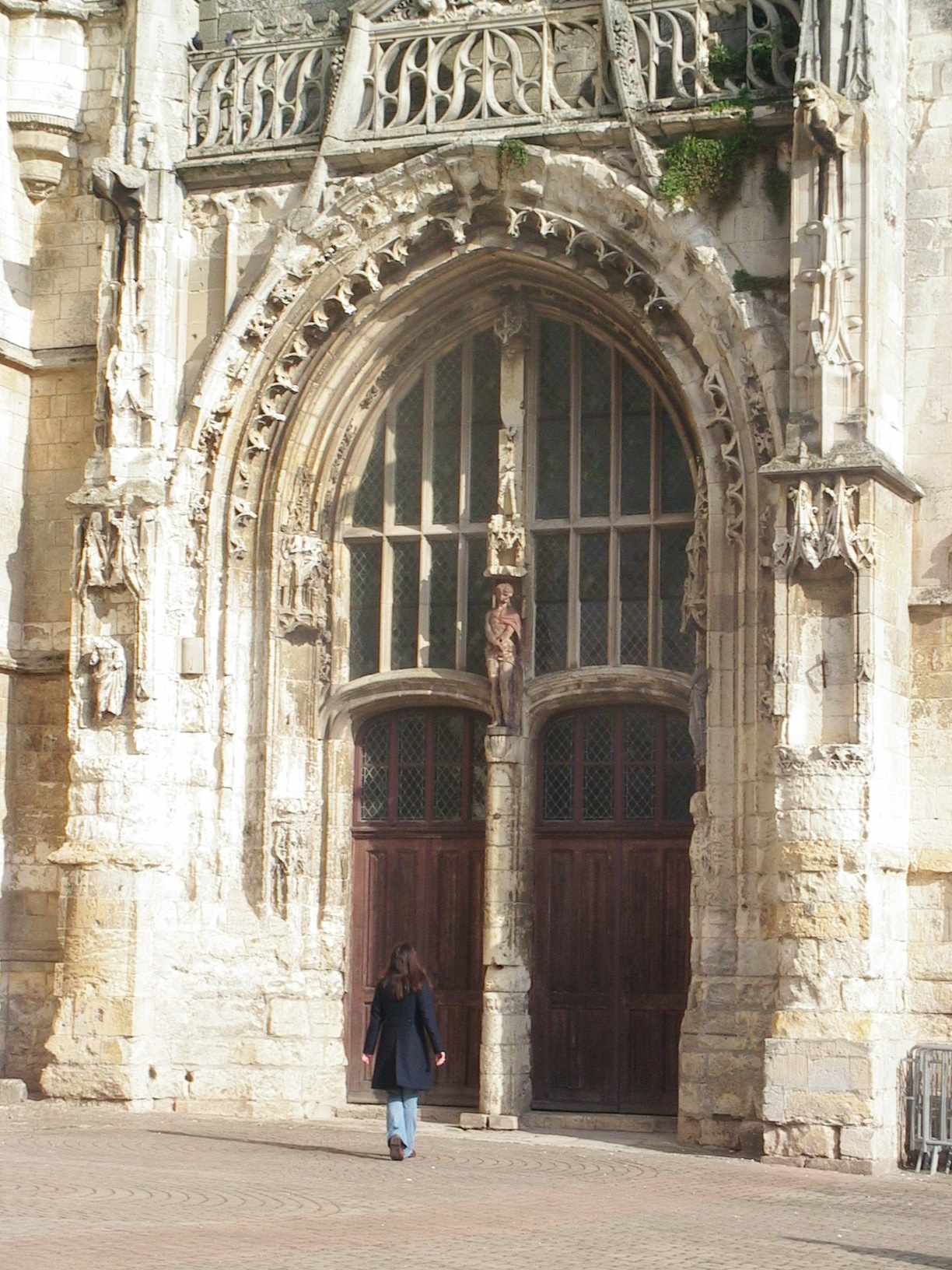
Church portal

== See also ==
- Communes of the Somme department
