= Avre (Somme) =

River in France

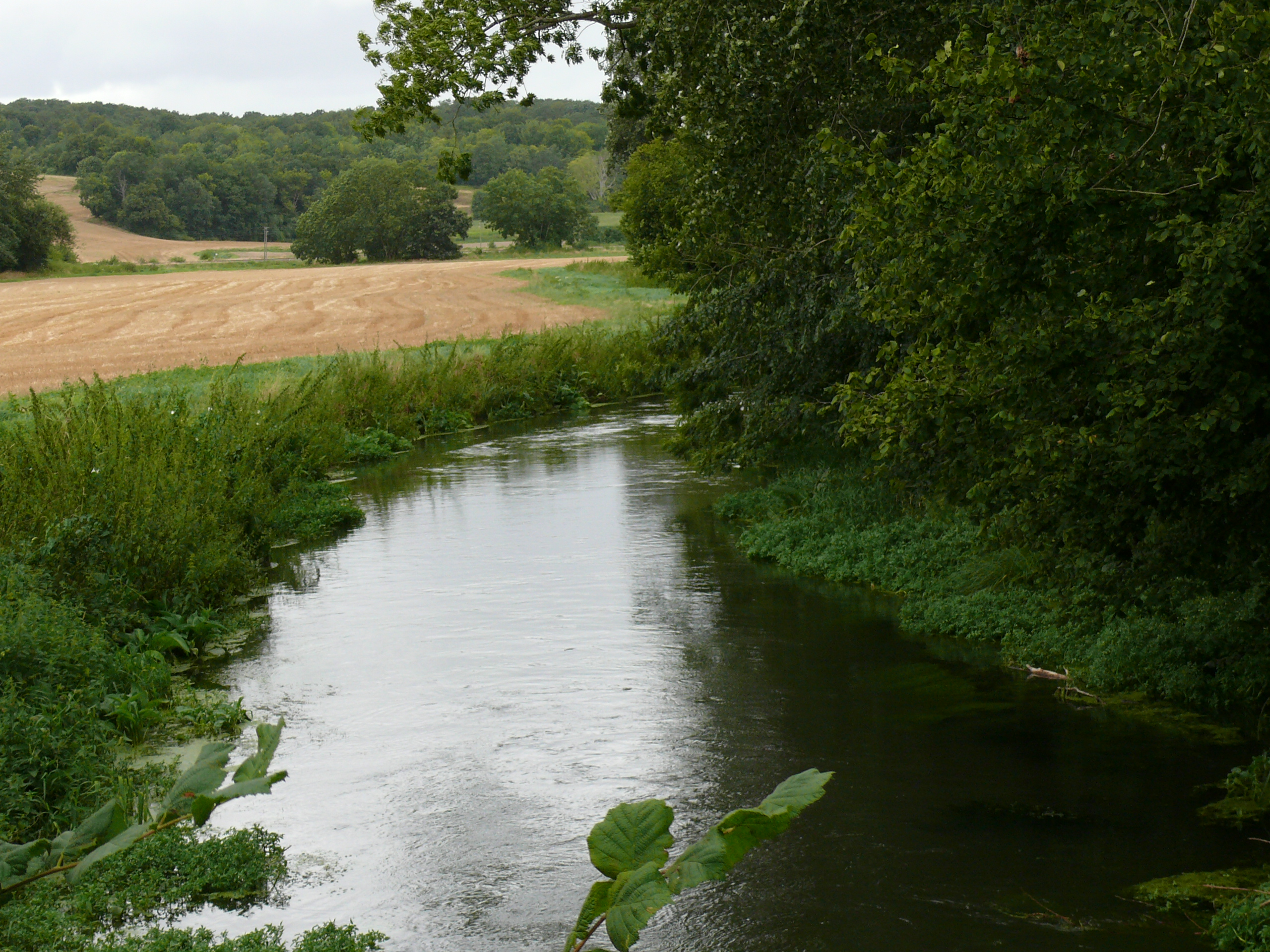
- The Avre at La Neuville-Sire-Bernard

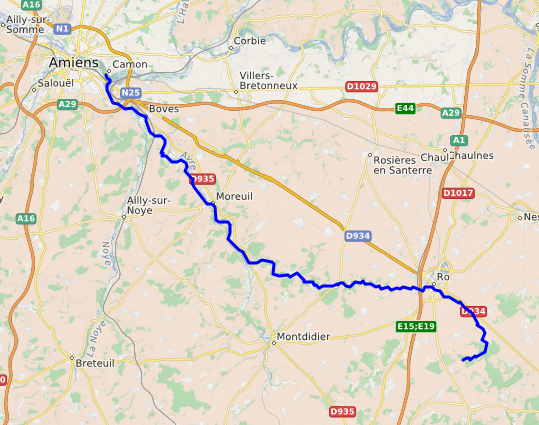

Location
- Country: France

Physical characteristics
- Source
  - location: Amy, Oise
  - elevation: 280 m (920 ft)
- Mouth
  - location: Somme
  - coordinates: 49°53′0″N 2°20′25″E
- Length: 66 km (41 mi)
- Basin size: 1,150 km^{2} (440 sq mi)
- Discharge
  - average: 5.1 m^{3}/s (180 cu ft/s)

Basin features
- Progression: Somme→ English Channel

The Avre (French pronunciation: [avʁ]) is a river in Picardy, France, and is the principal tributary, from the left side, of the River Somme.

== Background ==
At 66 kilometres (41 mi) long, it drains a relatively important basin of 1,150 km^{2} but only flows at best 5.1 m^{3}/s near its confluence at Longueau.
Its principal tributaries are: the Noye, joining at Boves, the Trois Doms joining at Pierrepont-sur-Avre, the Brache joining at Braches and the Luce at Berteaucourt-les-Thennes.
