= Vrély =

- Commune
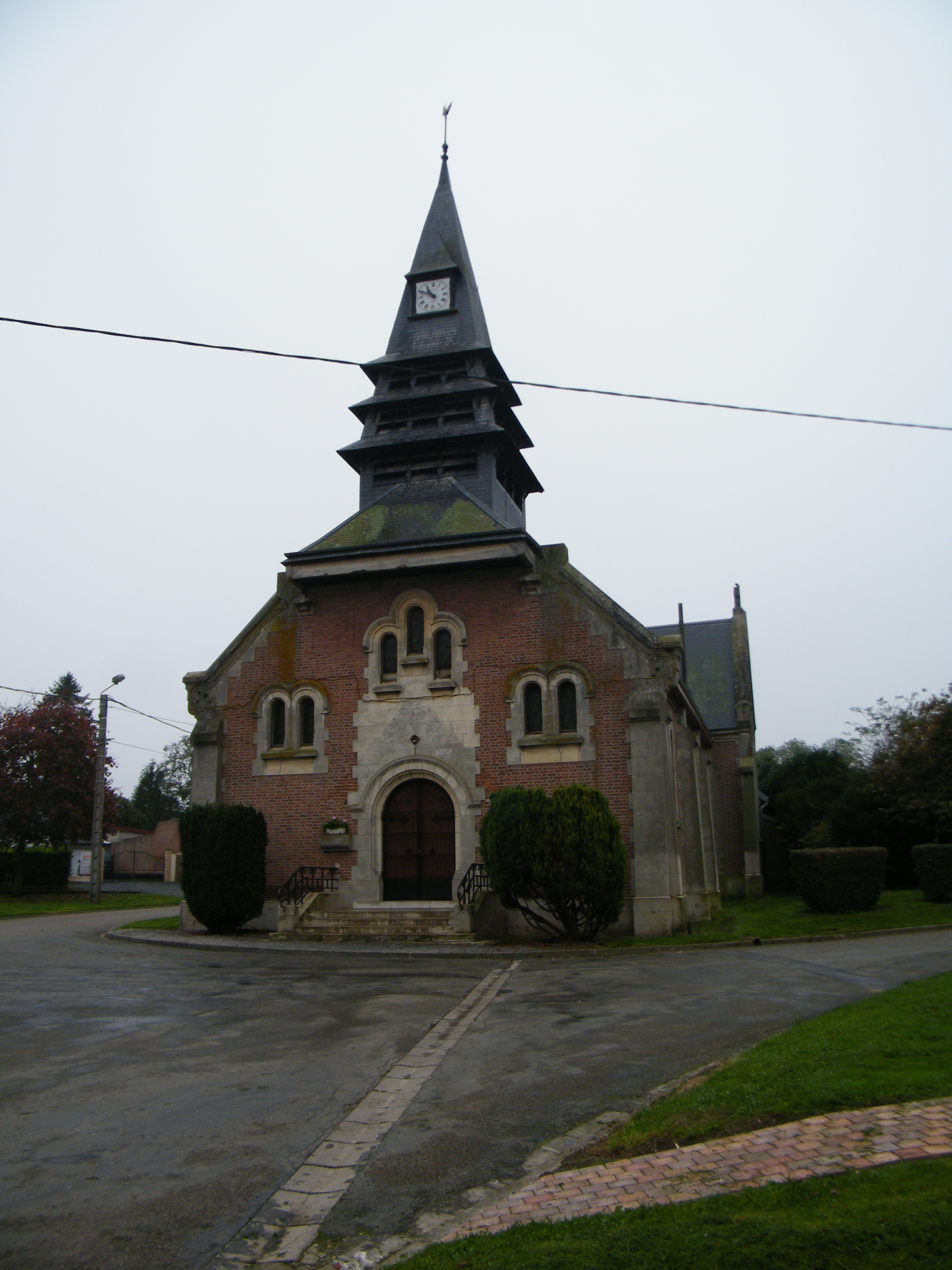
- The church in Vrély
- Location of Vrély
- Location within France Location within Hauts-de-France
- Coordinates: 49°47′56″N 2°41′38″E
- Country: France
- Region: Hauts-de-France
- Department: Somme
- Arrondissement: Péronne
- Canton: Moreuil
- Intercommunality: Terre de Picardie

Government
  - Mayor (2023–2026): Dominique Pronnier
- Area^{1}: 5.66 km^{2} (2.19 sq mi)
- Elevation: 95 m (312 ft)
- Highest elevation: 97 m (318 ft)
- Lowest elevation: 68 m (223 ft)
- Population (2023): 459
  - Density: 81.1/km^{2} (210/sq mi)
- Time zone: UTC+01:00 (CET)
  - Summer (DST): UTC+02:00 (CEST)
- INSEE/Postal code: 80814 /80170
- ^{1} French Land Register data, which excludes lakes, ponds, glaciers > 1 km^{2} (0.386 sq mi or 247 acres) and river estuaries.

Vrély (French pronunciation: [vʁeli]) is a commune in the Somme department in Hauts-de-France in northern France.

== Geography ==
The commune is situated 25 miles (40 km) southwest of Amiens, at the junction of the D34 and D329 roads.

== Population ==
Historical population
Year	Pop.	±% p.a.
1968	486	—
1975	423	−1.96%
1982	415	−0.27%
1990	406	−0.27%
1999	431	+0.67%
2007	458	+0.76%
2012	454	−0.18%
2017	437	−0.76%
2023	459	+0.82%
Source: INSEE

== See also ==
- Communes of the Somme department
