= Santerre (region) =

The Santerre (French pronunciation: [sɑ̃tɛʁ]; Picard: Santérre) is a natural region of France, located in the center of the administrative region of Picardy.

Located between Amiens and Saint-Quentin, the Santerre is a territory covering an area of about 3,000 km^{2}, including 242 communes and with a population of 106,489 inhabitants. Still covered with forests at the beginning of the Middle Ages, the region has been largely cleared to make room for agriculture. It was on the border of France until 1659, and has been invaded many times during the history of France. In particular, it was a major battleground for the Battle of Somme during World War I.
