= Communauté de communes du Pays Neslois =

Coordinates: 49.7601°N 2.9129°E

Pays Neslois
- Former communauté de communes
- Interactive map of Pays Neslois
- Country: France
- Region: Hauts-de-France
- Department: Somme
- No. of communes: {{{nbcomm}}}
- Disbanded: 2017
- Area: 126.1 km^{2} (48.7 sq mi)
- Population (2013): 8,505
  - Density: 67.45/km^{2} (174.7/sq mi)

The Communauté de communes du Pays Neslois is a former communauté de communes in the Somme département and in the Picardie région of France. It was created in May 1964. It was merged into the new Communauté de communes de l'Est de la Somme in January 2017.

== Composition ==
This Communauté de communes comprised 24 communes:

1. Béthencourt-sur-Somme
2. Billancourt
3. Breuil
4. Buverchy
5. Cizancourt
6. Curchy
7. Épénancourt
8. Falvy
9. Grécourt
10. Hombleux
11. Languevoisin-Quiquery
12. Licourt
13. Mesnil-Saint-Nicaise
14. Morchain
15. Moyencourt
16. Nesle
17. Pargny
18. Potte
19. Rethonvillers
20. Rouy-le-Grand
21. Rouy-le-Petit
22. Saint-Christ-Briost
23. Villecourt
24. Voyennes

== See also ==
- Communes of the Somme department
