= Communauté de communes du Pays Hamois =

Coordinates: 49.7472°N 3.0727°E

Pays Hamois
- Former communauté de communes
- Interactive map of Pays Hamois
- Country: France
- Region: Hauts-de-France
- Department: Somme
- No. of communes: {{{nbcomm}}}
- Established: 1960
- Disbanded: 2017

The Communauté de communes du Pays Hamois is a former communauté de communes in the Somme département and in the Picardie région of France. It was created in October 1960. It was merged into the new Communauté de communes de l'Est de la Somme in January 2017.

== Composition ==
This Communauté de communes comprised 18 communes:

1. Athies
2. Brouchy
3. Croix-Moligneaux
4. Douilly
5. Ennemain
6. Eppeville
7. Esmery-Hallon
8. Ham
9. Matigny
10. Monchy-Lagache
11. Muille-Villette
12. Offoy
13. Pithon
14. Quivières
15. Sancourt
16. Tertry
17. Ugny-l'Équipée
18. Y

== See also ==
- Communes of the Somme department
