= Canton of Nesle =

Coordinates: 49°45′31″N 2°54′38″E

Nesle
- Former canton
- Interactive map of Nesle
- Country: France
- Region: Hauts-de-France
- Department: Somme
- No. of communes: {{{nbcomm}}}
- Disbanded: 2015
- Area: 111.45 km^{2} (43.03 sq mi)
- Population (2012): 8,076
  - Density: 72.46/km^{2} (187.7/sq mi)

The Canton of Nesle is a former canton situated in the department of the Somme and in the Picardie region of northern France. It was disbanded following the French canton reorganisation which came into effect in March 2015. It consisted of 21 communes, which joined the canton of Ham in 2015. It had 8,076 inhabitants (2012).

== Geography ==
The canton is organised around the commune of Nesle in the arrondissement of Péronne. The altitude varies from 47m (Saint-Christ-Briost) to 104m (Licourt) for an average of 71m.

The canton comprised 21 communes:

- Béthencourt-sur-Somme
- Buverchy
- Cizancourt
- Épénancourt
- Falvy
- Grécourt
- Hombleux
- Languevoisin-Quiquery
- Licourt
- Marchélepot
- Mesnil-Saint-Nicaise
- Misery
- Morchain
- Nesle
- Pargny
- Pertain
- Potte
- Rouy-le-Grand
- Rouy-le-Petit
- Saint-Christ-Briost
- Voyennes

== Population ==
Population Growth
1962	1968	1975	1982	1990	1999
7104	7488	7742	7943	7899	7546
Census count starting from 1962 : Population without double counting

== See also ==
- Arrondissements of the Somme department
- Cantons of the Somme department
- Communes of the Somme department
