= Rouy =

Rouy may refer to:

== People ==
- Georges Rouy (1851–1924), French botanist
- Maryse Rouy (born 1951), French writer

== Places ==
- Amigny-Rouy, Aisne, France
- Rouy, Nièvre, France
- Rouy-le-Grand, Somme, France
- Rouy-le-Petit, Somme, France
