= Offoy =

Offoy may refer to the following places in France:

- Offoy, Oise, a commune in the Oise department
- Offoy, Somme, a commune in the Somme department
