= Communauté de communes de l'Est de la Somme =

Federation of municipalities in France

Coordinates: 49.75°N 3.07°E

Est de la Somme
- Communauté de communes
- Location within the Somme department
- Country: France
- Region: Hauts-de-France
- Department: Aisne, Somme
- No. of communes: {{{nbcomm}}}
- Established: 1 January 2017

Government
  - President: José Rioja Fernandez
- Area: 264.60 km^{2} (102.16 sq mi)
- Population (2018): 20,301
  - Density: 76.723/km^{2} (198.71/sq mi)

The Communauté de communes de l'Est de la Somme is a communauté de communes in the Somme and Aisne départements and in the Hauts-de-France région of France. It was formed on 1 January 2017 by the merger of the former Communauté de communes du Pays Hamois and the Communauté de communes du Pays Neslois. It consists of 41 communes (one of which, Pithon, in Aisne), and its seat is in Ham. Its area is 264.6 km^{2}, and its population was 20,301 in 2018.

== Composition ==
The communauté de communes consists of the following 41 communes:

List of communes of the Communauté de communes de l'Est de la Somme
Commune	Code INSEE	Demonym	Area (km^{2})	Population (2017)	Population density (per km^{2})
Ham (seat)	80410	Hamois	9.5	4,611	485
Athies	80034	Althéiens	10.67	594	56
Béthencourt-sur-Somme	80097		2.87	129	45
Billancourt	80105	Billancourtois	4.95	173	35
Breuil	80139		2.17	46	21
Brouchy	80144	Brouchissois	8.07	512	63
Buverchy	80158	Buverchois	1.85	49	26
Cizancourt	80197		1.83	34	19
Croix-Moligneaux	80226		7.88	278	35
Curchy	80230	Curchéiens	9.63	298	31
Douilly	80252		9.88	240	24
Ennemain	80267		6.44	262	41
Épénancourt	80272		3.5	123	35
Eppeville	80274	Eppevillois	4.95	1,816	367
Esmery-Hallon	80284		18.9	767	41
Falvy	80300	Falviens	6.32	150	24
Hombleux	80442		15.81	1,180	75
Languevoisin-Quiquery	80465		4.83	195	40
Licourt	80474	Licourtois	6.93	400	58
Matigny	80519		6.99	503	72
Mesnil-Saint-Nicaise	80542	Mesnilois	6.8	561	82
Monchy-Lagache	80555		15.44	643	42
Morchain	80568		5.84	352	60
Moyencourt	80576		4.15	317	76
Muille-Villette	80579		6.53	831	127
Nesle	80585	Neslois	7.72	2,339	303
Offoy	80605		7.1	217	31
Pargny	80616	Pargnisiens	3.68	205	56
Pithon	02604	Pithonais	2.44	83	34
Potte	80638	Pottois	3.27	103	31
Quivières	80658		6.83	142	21
Rethonvillers	80669		7.12	366	51
Rouy-le-Grand	80683		3.81	107	28
Rouy-le-Petit	80684	Rouyssiens	3.27	112	34
Saint-Christ-Briost	80701		7.82	437	56
Sancourt	80726		7.2	267	37
Tertry	80750	Testriciens	4.93	156	32
Ugny-l'Équipée	80771		2.85	40	14
Villecourt	80794	Villecourtois	2.19	58	26
Voyennes	80811	Voyennois	8.87	603	68
Y	80829	Ypsiloniens	2.73	92	34

== Organization ==
=== Elected members ===
The communauté de communes if administered by a conseil communautaire composed of 64 members prior to 2020 and 63 members since the 2020 French municipal elections. Seats are appropriated proportionally to individual communes, based upon their population as follows:

- 11 delegates for Ham.
- 6 delegates for Nesle.
- 4 delegates for Eppeville.
- 3 delegates for Hombleux.
- 2 delegates for both Esmery-Hallon and Muille-Villette.
- 1 delegate for each of the 35 remaining communes.

=== Presidents ===
List of successive presidents of the Communauté de communes de l'Est de la Somme
In office		President	Party	Capacity	Ref.
January 2017	July 2020	André Salomé	LR	Mayor of Rouy-le-Petit (2001—) President of the Communauté de communes du Pays Neslois (2001—2016)	
July 2020	Present	José Rioja	DVD	Mayor of Nesle (2014—2020) Municipal councillor of Nesle (20014—) Vice President of the Communauté de communes du Pays Neslois (2014— 2016) Vice President of the Communauté de communes de l'Est de la Somme (2017— 2020)	
