= Croix-Moligneaux =

- Commune
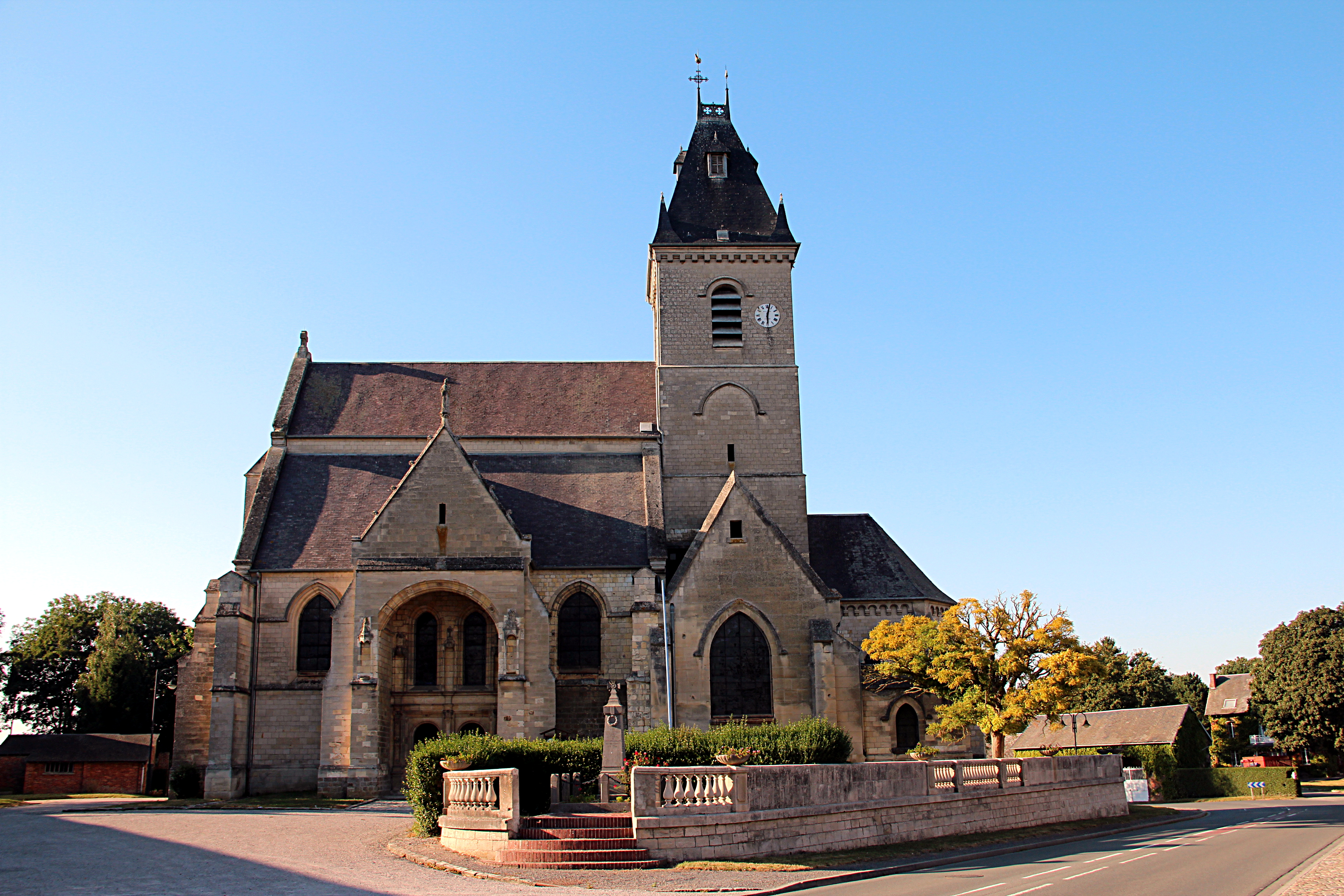
- The church in Croix-Moligneaux
- Location of Croix-Moligneaux
- Location within France Location within Hauts-de-France
- Coordinates: 49°48′57″N 3°00′15″E
- Country: France
- Region: Hauts-de-France
- Department: Somme
- Arrondissement: Péronne
- Canton: Ham
- Intercommunality: CC Est de la Somme

Government
  - Mayor (2020–2026): Hervé Frizon
- Area^{1}: 7.88 km^{2} (3.04 sq mi)
- Elevation: 75 m (246 ft)
- Highest elevation: 88 m (289 ft)
- Lowest elevation: 59 m (194 ft)
- Population (2023): 270
  - Density: 34/km^{2} (89/sq mi)
- Time zone: UTC+01:00 (CET)
  - Summer (DST): UTC+02:00 (CEST)
- INSEE/Postal code: 80226 /80400
- ^{1} French Land Register data, which excludes lakes, ponds, glaciers > 1 km^{2} (0.386 sq mi or 247 acres) and river estuaries.

Croix-Moligneaux (French pronunciation: [kʁwa mɔliɲo]; Picard: Cro-Moligneu) is a commune in the Somme department in Hauts-de-France in northern France.

== Geography ==
The commune is situated on the D937 road, 1.6 km from the banks of the river Somme, 17 kilometres (11 mi) west of Saint-Quentin.

The Seine-Nord canal will be dug near Croix-Moligneaux. As part of the preparatory works more than one hundred archaeological sites were identified by some fifty archaeologists around Croix-Moligneaux. The finds range from the Middle Paleolithic to the Middle Ages. These include a Roman road and numerous villas as well as a funerary monument from the Bronze Age.

The village name derives from a gallows erected here in Gallo-Roman times. The gallows was called by the Latin term of cruces which then translates into "cruci" (cross).

The village already has the status of parish on a document from the tenth century. This is confirmed in 1015 when Hardouin de Croÿ donated the land and the altar (altaria de crucibus) to the canons of Noyon.

== Land Marks ==
- The church of Saint Médard, built in the 12th century is in a Romanesque / Gothic transition style. The original tower collapsed and was rebuilt in the 17th century, then again, after the destruction of the First World War. The current choir dates from the 13th century. The remarkable Renaissance porch (sixteenth century) backs onto the second bay of the south aisle. The south portal is listed as a historic monument.

The interior includes stained-glass windows.

- Monument dedicated to Lieutenant Georges Feltz, French aviator, and his radio operator, Albert Nelias, shot down in the village on May 20, 1940 by a German fighter plane during the Battle of France.
- Old dovecote.

== Population ==
Historical population
Year	Pop.	±% p.a.
1968	324	—
1975	344	+0.86%
1982	289	−2.46%
1990	299	+0.43%
1999	308	+0.33%
2007	307	−0.04%
2012	315	+0.52%
2017	278	−2.47%
2023	270	−0.49%
Source: INSEE

== See also ==
- Communes of the Somme department
