= Douilly =

- Commune
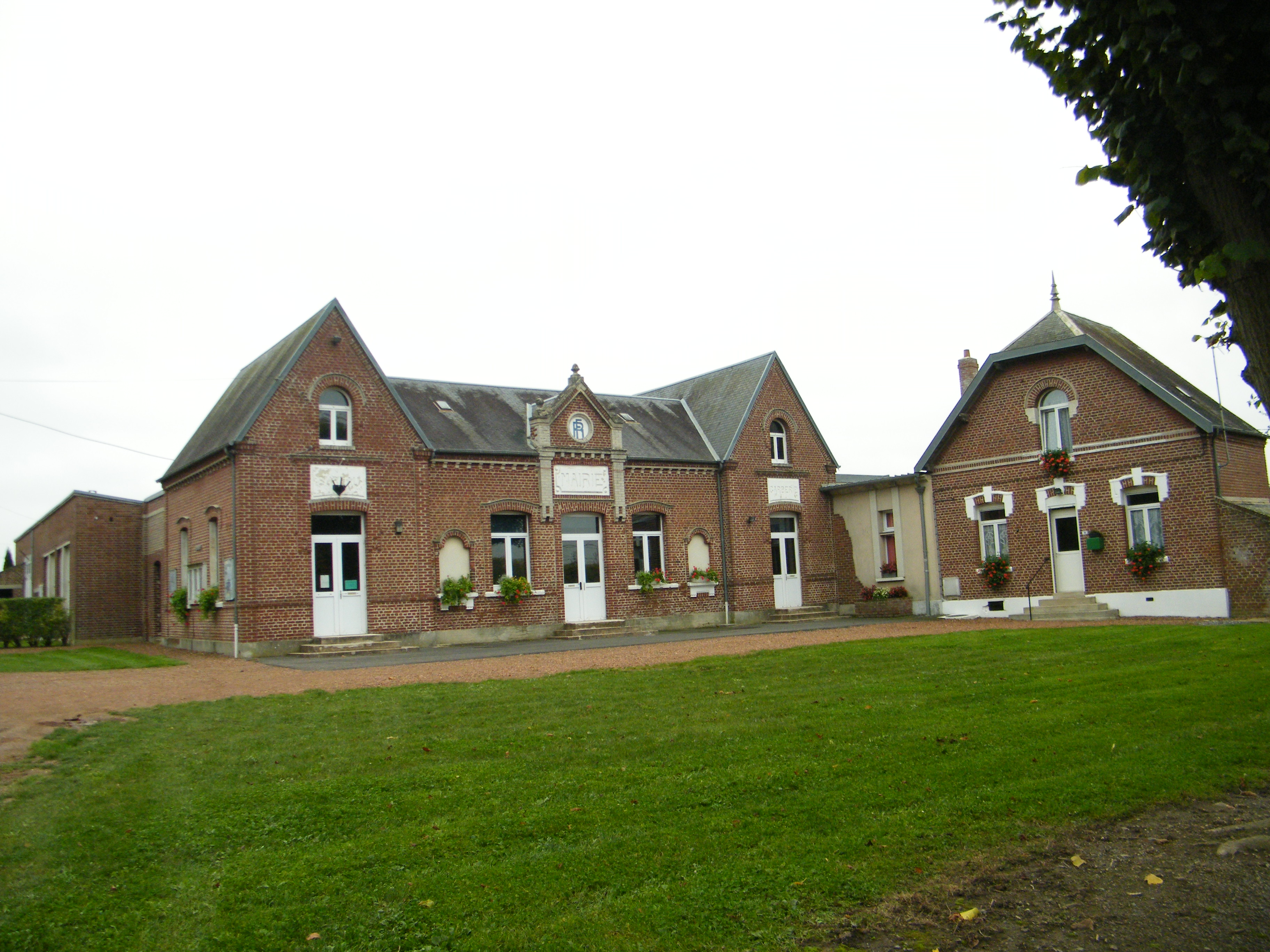
- The town hall and school in Douilly
- Location of Douilly
- Location within France Location within Hauts-de-France
- Coordinates: 49°47′39″N 3°03′48″E
- Country: France
- Region: Hauts-de-France
- Department: Somme
- Arrondissement: Péronne
- Canton: Ham
- Intercommunality: CC Est de la Somme

Government
  - Mayor (2020–2026): Aline Sprysch
- Area^{1}: 9.88 km^{2} (3.81 sq mi)
- Elevation: 76 m (249 ft)
- Highest elevation: 87 m (285 ft)
- Lowest elevation: 57 m (187 ft)
- Population (2023): 250
  - Density: 25/km^{2} (66/sq mi)
- Time zone: UTC+01:00 (CET)
  - Summer (DST): UTC+02:00 (CEST)
- INSEE/Postal code: 80252 /80400
- ^{1} French Land Register data, which excludes lakes, ponds, glaciers > 1 km^{2} (0.386 sq mi or 247 acres) and river estuaries.

Douilly (French pronunciation: [duji]) is a commune in the Somme department in Hauts-de-France in northern France.

== Geography ==
Douilly is situated on the D145 and D189 crossroads, some 10 miles (16 km) southwest of Saint-Quentin.

== Population ==
Historical population
Year	Pop.	±% p.a.
1968	296	—
1975	292	−0.19%
1982	260	−1.64%
1990	250	−0.49%
1999	222	−1.31%
2007	246	+1.29%
2012	243	−0.25%
2017	240	−0.25%
2023	250	+0.68%
Source: INSEE

== See also ==
- Communes of the Somme department
