= Sancourt, Somme =

Sancourt
- Commune
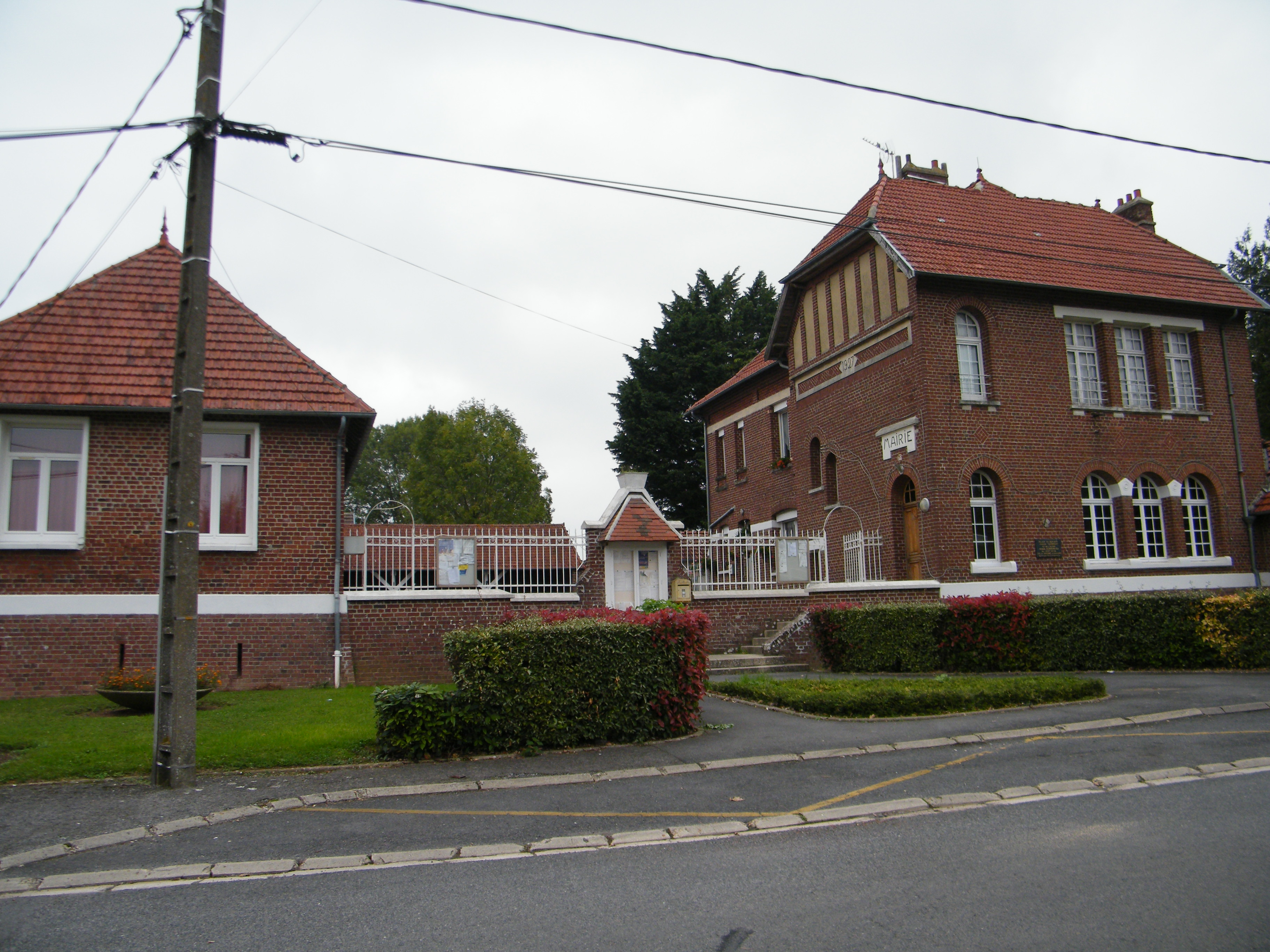
- The town hall and school in Sancourt
- Location of Sancourt
- Location within France Location within Hauts-de-France
- Coordinates: 49°46′26″N 3°02′23″E
- Country: France
- Region: Hauts-de-France
- Department: Somme
- Arrondissement: Péronne
- Canton: Ham
- Intercommunality: CC Est de la Somme

Government
  - Mayor (2020–2026): Michel Martin
- Area^{1}: 7.2 km^{2} (2.8 sq mi)
- Elevation: 60 m (200 ft)
- Highest elevation: 82 m (269 ft)
- Lowest elevation: 57 m (187 ft)
- Population (2023): 269
  - Density: 37/km^{2} (97/sq mi)
- Time zone: UTC+01:00 (CET)
  - Summer (DST): UTC+02:00 (CEST)
- INSEE/Postal code: 80726 /80400
- ^{1} French Land Register data, which excludes lakes, ponds, glaciers > 1 km^{2} (0.386 sq mi or 247 acres) and river estuaries.

Sancourt (French pronunciation: [sɑ̃kuʁ]) is a commune in the Somme department in Hauts-de-France in northern France.

== Geography ==
Sancourt is situated 38 miles (61 km) east of Amiens, in the far southeast of the department, by the banks of the river Somme and on the D937 road

== Population ==
Historical population
Year	Pop.	±% p.a.
1968	294	—
1975	273	−1.05%
1982	310	+1.83%
1990	317	+0.28%
1999	279	−1.41%
2007	279	+0.00%
2012	261	−1.32%
2017	267	+0.46%
2023	269	+0.12%
Source: INSEE

== See also ==
- Communes of the Somme department
