= Monchy-Lagache =

- Commune
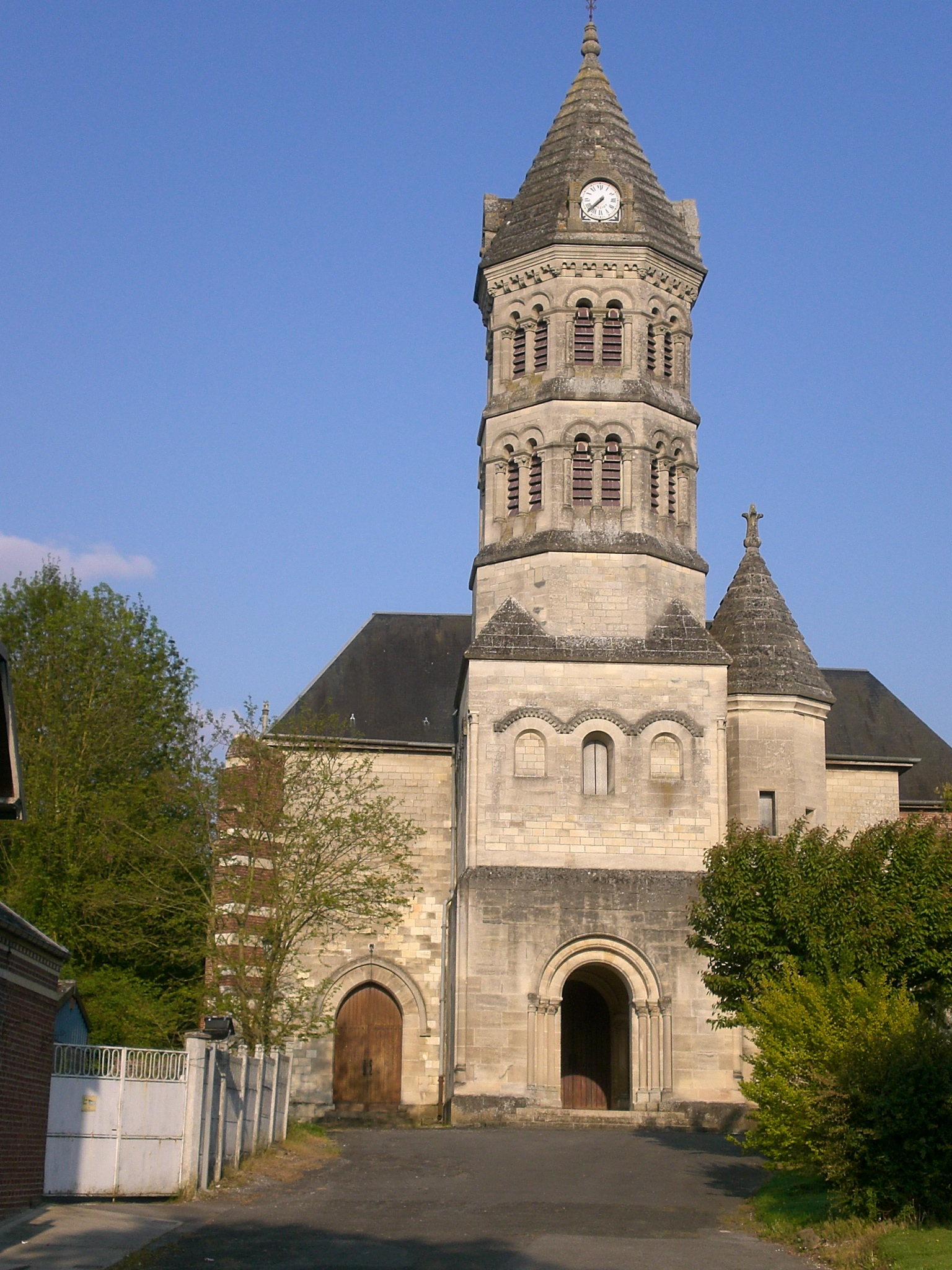
- The church in Monchy-Lagache

- Coat of arms
- Location of Monchy-Lagache
- Location within France Location within Hauts-de-France
- Coordinates: 49°51′09″N 3°02′43″E
- Country: France
- Region: Hauts-de-France
- Department: Somme
- Arrondissement: Péronne
- Canton: Ham
- Intercommunality: CC Est de la Somme

Government
  - Mayor (2020–2026): Jacques Pinchon
- Area^{1}: 15.44 km^{2} (5.96 sq mi)
- Elevation: 74 m (243 ft)
- Highest elevation: 95 m (312 ft)
- Lowest elevation: 57 m (187 ft)
- Population (2023): 593
  - Density: 38.4/km^{2} (99.5/sq mi)
- Time zone: UTC+01:00 (CET)
  - Summer (DST): UTC+02:00 (CEST)
- INSEE/Postal code: 80555 /80200
- ^{1} French Land Register data, which excludes lakes, ponds, glaciers > 1 km^{2} (0.386 sq mi or 247 acres) and river estuaries.

Monchy-Lagache (French pronunciation: [mɔ̃ʃi laɡaʃ]) is a commune in the Somme department in Hauts-de-France in northern France.

== Geography ==
The commune is situated on the D15 road, some 10 miles (16 km) west of Saint-Quentin, on the northeastern border of the department.

== Population ==
Historical population
Year	Pop.	±% p.a.
1968	651	—
1975	752	+2.08%
1982	810	+1.07%
1990	785	−0.39%
1999	740	−0.65%
2007	733	−0.12%
2012	673	−1.69%
2017	643	−0.91%
2023	593	−1.34%
Source: INSEE

== See also ==
- Communes of the Somme department
