= Esmery-Hallon =

- Commune
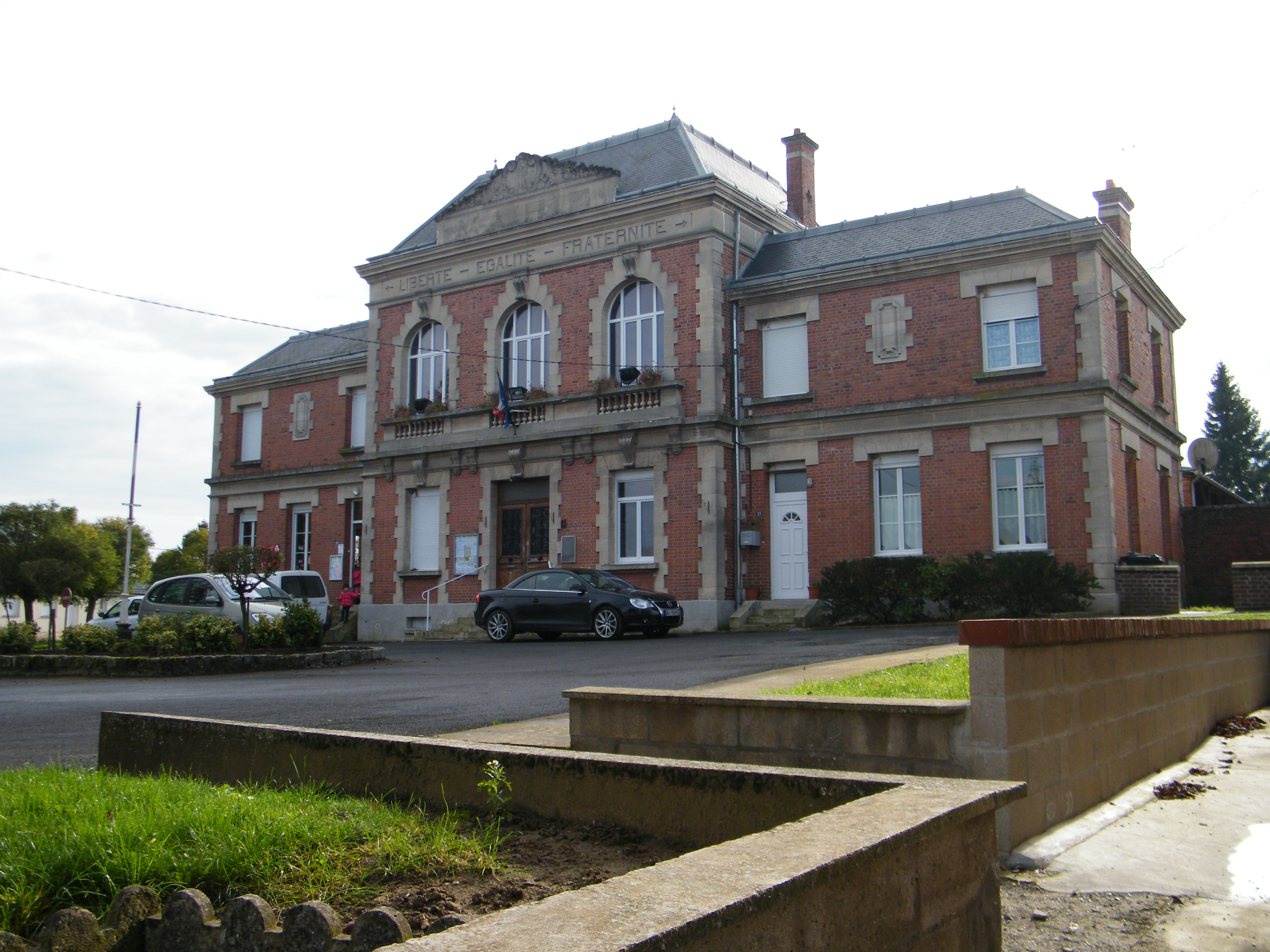
- The town hall in Esmery-Hallon

- Coat of arms
- Location of Esmery-Hallon
- Location within France Location within Hauts-de-France
- Coordinates: 49°43′03″N 3°00′38″E
- Country: France
- Region: Hauts-de-France
- Department: Somme
- Arrondissement: Péronne
- Canton: Ham
- Intercommunality: CC Est de la Somme

Government
  - Mayor (2020–2026): François Laloi
- Area^{1}: 18.9 km^{2} (7.3 sq mi)
- Elevation: 70 m (230 ft)
- Highest elevation: 87 m (285 ft)
- Lowest elevation: 57 m (187 ft)
- Population (2023): 715
  - Density: 37.8/km^{2} (98.0/sq mi)
- Time zone: UTC+01:00 (CET)
  - Summer (DST): UTC+02:00 (CEST)
- INSEE/Postal code: 80284 /80400
- ^{1} French Land Register data, which excludes lakes, ponds, glaciers > 1 km^{2} (0.386 sq mi or 247 acres) and river estuaries.

Esmery-Hallon (French pronunciation: [ɛmʁi alɔ̃]; Picard: Inmery-Hallon) is a commune in the Somme department in Hauts-de-France in northern France.

== Geography ==
The commune is situated on the D186 and D17 junction, some 15 miles (24 km) southwest of Saint-Quentin.

== Population ==
Historical population
Year	Pop.	±% p.a.
1968	710	—
1975	791	+1.56%
1982	807	+0.29%
1990	727	−1.30%
1999	764	+0.55%
2007	764	+0.00%
2012	790	+0.67%
2017	767	−0.59%
2023	715	−1.16%
Source: INSEE

== See also ==
- Communes of the Somme department
