= Muille-Villette =

- Commune
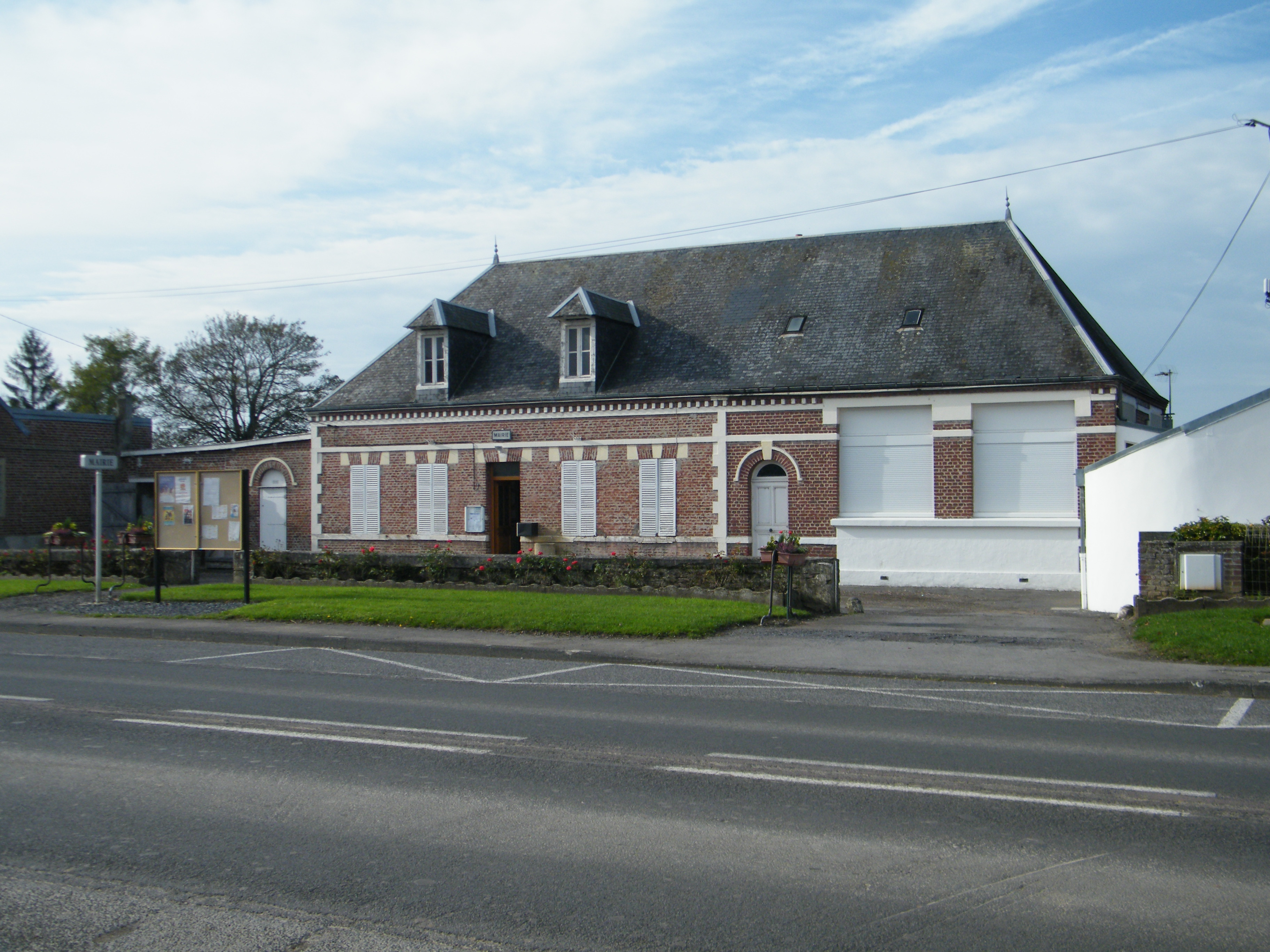
- The town hall in Muille-Villette
- Location of Muille-Villette
- Location within France Location within Hauts-de-France
- Coordinates: 49°43′41″N 3°04′02″E
- Country: France
- Region: Hauts-de-France
- Department: Somme
- Arrondissement: Péronne
- Canton: Ham
- Intercommunality: CC Est de la Somme

Government
  - Mayor (2020–2026): Florian Slosarczyk
- Area^{1}: 6.53 km^{2} (2.52 sq mi)
- Elevation: 65 m (213 ft)
- Highest elevation: 75 m (246 ft)
- Lowest elevation: 58 m (190 ft)
- Population (2023): 789
  - Density: 121/km^{2} (313/sq mi)
- Time zone: UTC+01:00 (CET)
  - Summer (DST): UTC+02:00 (CEST)
- INSEE/Postal code: 80579 /80400
- ^{1} French Land Register data, which excludes lakes, ponds, glaciers > 1 km^{2} (0.386 sq mi or 247 acres) and river estuaries.

Muille-Villette is a commune in the Somme department in Hauts-de-France in northern France.

== Geography ==
The commune is situated on the D932 road, some 15 miles (24 km) southwest of Saint-Quentin, in the far southeast of the département.

== Population ==
Historical population
Year	Pop.	±% p.a.
1968	816	—
1975	822	+0.10%
1982	800	−0.39%
1990	745	−0.89%
1999	785	+0.58%
2007	802	+0.27%
2012	839	+0.91%
2017	831	−0.19%
2023	789	−0.86%
Source: INSEE

== See also ==
- Communes of the Somme department
