= Rethonvillers =

- Commune
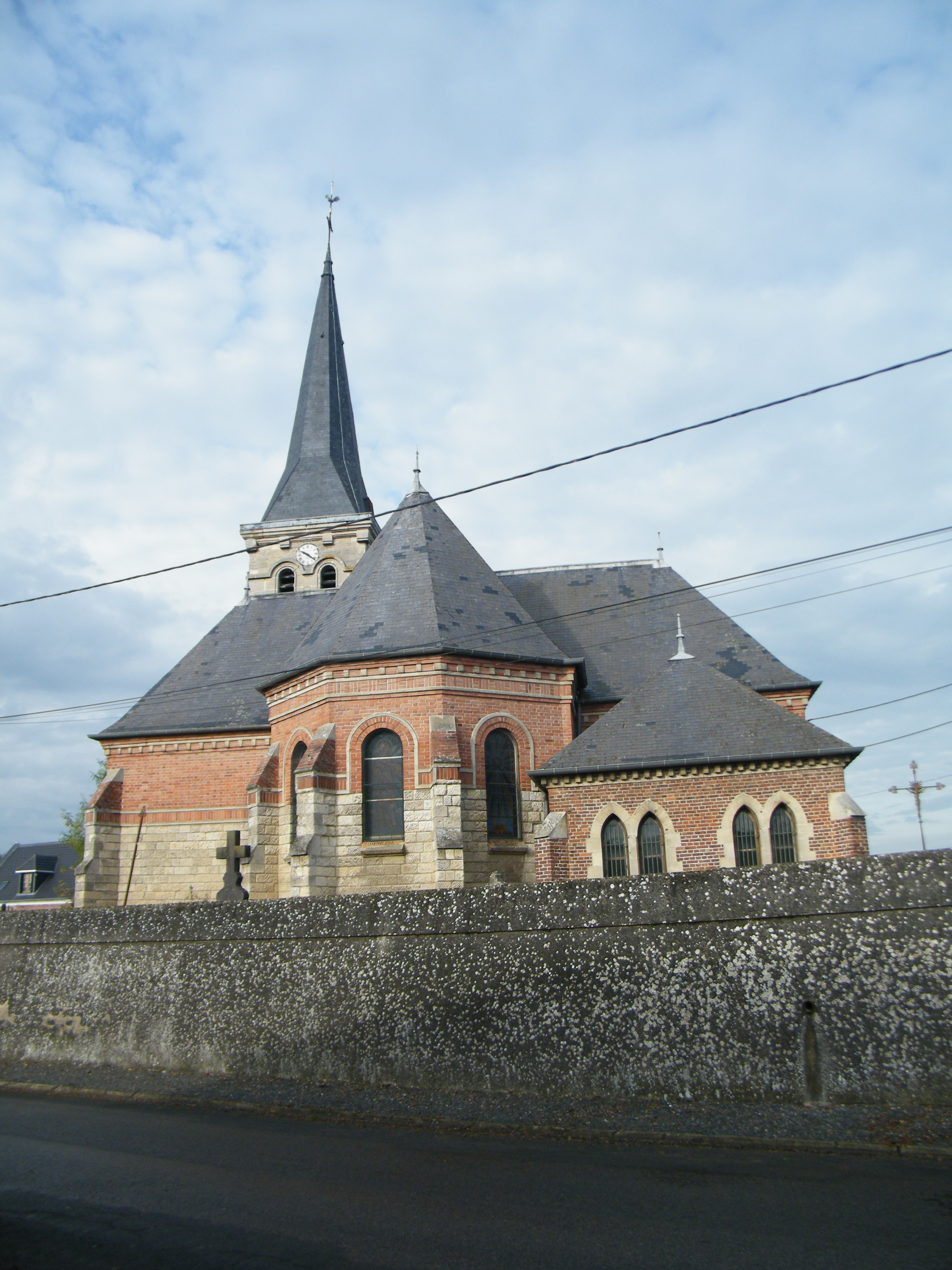
- The church in Rethonvillers
- Location of Rethonvillers
- Location within France Location within Hauts-de-France
- Coordinates: 49°44′03″N 2°52′00″E
- Country: France
- Region: Hauts-de-France
- Department: Somme
- Arrondissement: Péronne
- Canton: Ham
- Intercommunality: CC Est de la Somme

Government
  - Mayor (2020–2026): Philippe Lefèvre
- Area^{1}: 7.12 km^{2} (2.75 sq mi)
- Elevation: 80 m (260 ft)
- Highest elevation: 95 m (312 ft)
- Lowest elevation: 73 m (240 ft)
- Population (2023): 346
  - Density: 48.6/km^{2} (126/sq mi)
- Time zone: UTC+01:00 (CET)
  - Summer (DST): UTC+02:00 (CEST)
- INSEE/Postal code: 80669 /80700
- ^{1} French Land Register data, which excludes lakes, ponds, glaciers > 1 km^{2} (0.386 sq mi or 247 acres) and river estuaries.

Rethonvillers is a commune in the Somme department in Hauts-de-France in northern France.

== Geography ==
Rethonvillers is situated 32 miles (51 km) southeast of Amiens, on the D930 road

== Population ==
Historical population
Year	Pop.	±% p.a.
1968	335	—
1975	286	−2.23%
1982	303	+0.83%
1990	335	+1.26%
1999	300	−1.22%
2007	332	+1.27%
2012	352	+1.18%
2017	366	+0.78%
2023	346	−0.93%
Source: INSEE

== Places of interest ==
- 18th century church

== See also ==
- Communes of the Somme department
