= Moyencourt =

- Commune
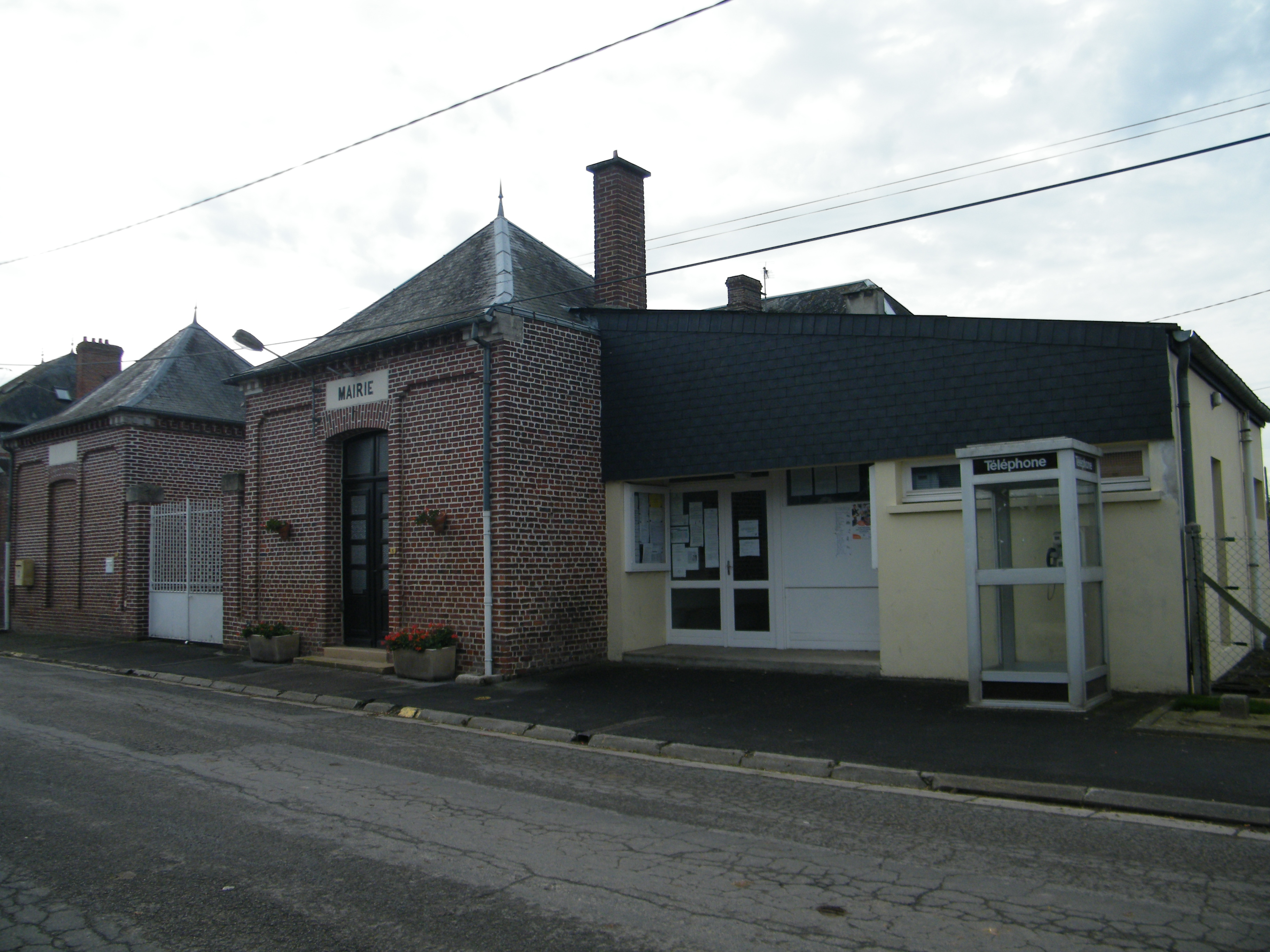
- The town hall in Moyencourt
- Location of Moyencourt
- Location within France Location within Hauts-de-France
- Coordinates: 49°43′21″N 2°57′09″E
- Country: France
- Region: Hauts-de-France
- Department: Somme
- Arrondissement: Péronne
- Canton: Ham
- Intercommunality: CC Est de la Somme

Government
  - Mayor (2020–2026): David Becquérelle
- Area^{1}: 4.15 km^{2} (1.60 sq mi)
- Elevation: 65 m (213 ft)
- Highest elevation: 77 m (253 ft)
- Lowest elevation: 56 m (184 ft)
- Population (2023): 314
  - Density: 75.7/km^{2} (196/sq mi)
- Time zone: UTC+01:00 (CET)
  - Summer (DST): UTC+02:00 (CEST)
- INSEE/Postal code: 80576 /80400
- ^{1} French Land Register data, which excludes lakes, ponds, glaciers > 1 km^{2} (0.386 sq mi or 247 acres) and river estuaries.

Moyencourt (French pronunciation: [mwajɛ̃kuʁ]) is a commune in the Somme department in Hauts-de-France in northern France.

== Geography ==
Moyencourt is situated on the D154 road, some 30 miles (48 km) southeast of Amiens.
Not to be confused with a commune of a similar name, Moyencourt-lès-Poix, further to the west of the département.

== Population ==
Historical population
Year	Pop.	±% p.a.
1968	309	—
1975	286	−1.10%
1982	283	−0.15%
1990	263	−0.91%
1999	241	−0.97%
2007	296	+2.60%
2012	308	+0.80%
2017	317	+0.58%
2023	314	−0.16%
Source: INSEE

== See also ==
- Communes of the Somme department
