= Villecourt =

- Commune
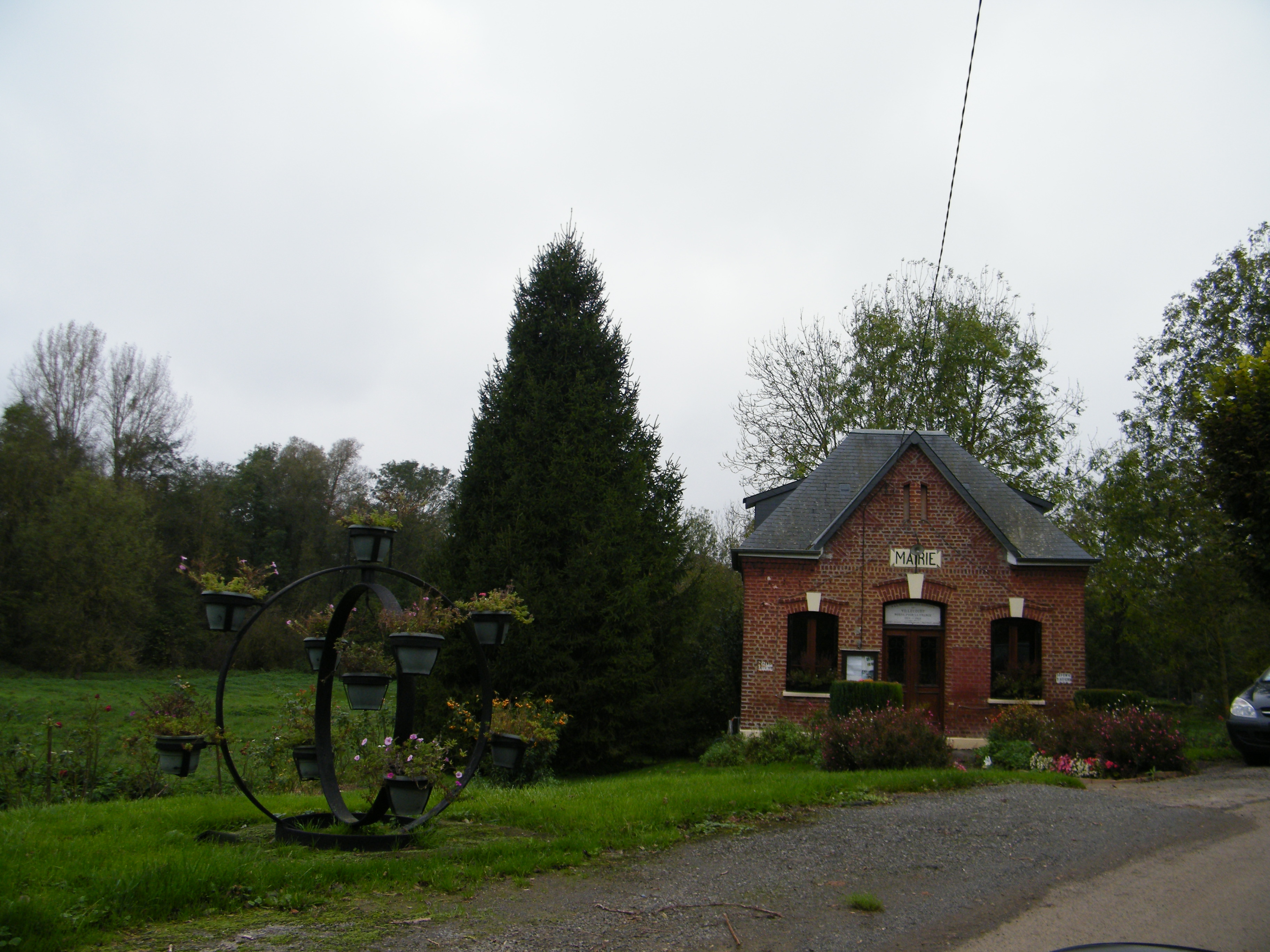
- The town hall in Villecourt
- Location of Villecourt
- Location within France Location within Hauts-de-France
- Coordinates: 49°48′01″N 2°58′19″E
- Country: France
- Region: Hauts-de-France
- Department: Somme
- Arrondissement: Péronne
- Canton: Ham
- Intercommunality: CC Est de la Somme

Government
  - Mayor (2020–2026): Benoît Schiettecatte
- Area^{1}: 2.19 km^{2} (0.85 sq mi)
- Elevation: 55 m (180 ft)
- Highest elevation: 75 m (246 ft)
- Lowest elevation: 52 m (171 ft)
- Population (2023): 46
  - Density: 21/km^{2} (54/sq mi)
- Time zone: UTC+01:00 (CET)
  - Summer (DST): UTC+02:00 (CEST)
- INSEE/Postal code: 80794 /80190
- ^{1} French Land Register data, which excludes lakes, ponds, glaciers > 1 km^{2} (0.386 sq mi or 247 acres) and river estuaries.

Villecourt (French pronunciation: [vilkuʁ]) is a commune in the Somme department in Hauts-de-France in northern France.

== Geography ==
Villecour is situated 30 miles (48 km) east southeast of Amiens, on the D15 road and by the banks of the Somme.

== Population ==
Historical population
| Year | Pop. | ±% p.a. |
|---|---|---|
| 1968 | 60 | — |
| 1975 | 48 | −3.14% |
| 1982 | 49 | +0.29% |
| 1990 | 46 | −0.79% |
| 1999 | 58 | +2.61% |
| 2007 | 59 | +0.21% |
| 2012 | 61 | +0.67% |
| 2017 | 58 | −1.00% |
| 2023 | 46 | −3.79% |
Source: INSEE

== See also ==
- Communes of the Somme department
