= Quivières =

- Commune
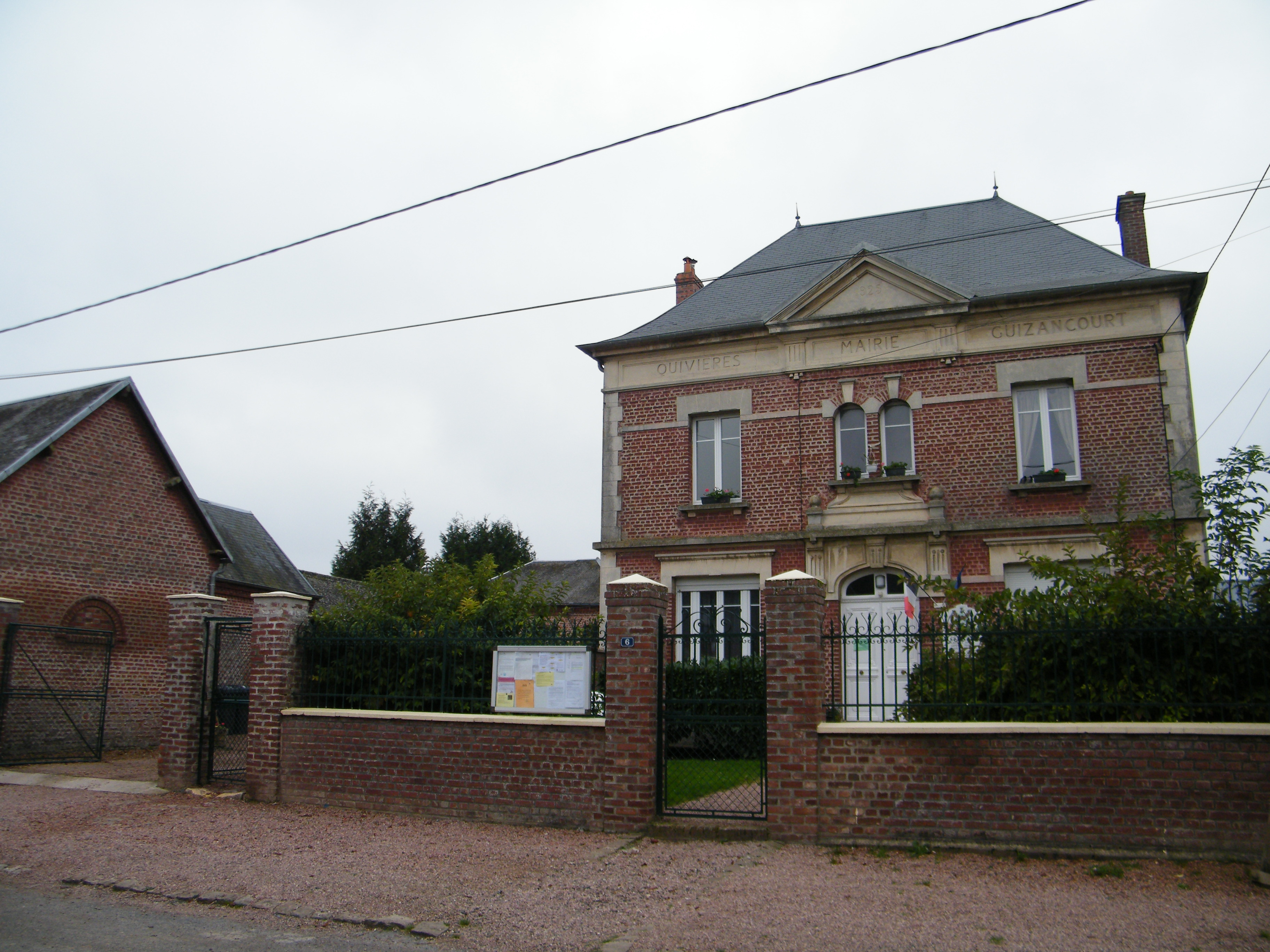
- The town hall in Quivières
- Location of Quivières
- Location within France Location within Hauts-de-France
- Coordinates: 49°49′23″N 3°02′19″E
- Country: France
- Region: Hauts-de-France
- Department: Somme
- Arrondissement: Péronne
- Canton: Ham
- Intercommunality: CC Est de la Somme

Government
  - Mayor (2020–2026): Françoise Ragueneau
- Area^{1}: 6.83 km^{2} (2.64 sq mi)
- Elevation: 85 m (279 ft)
- Highest elevation: 89 m (292 ft)
- Lowest elevation: 74 m (243 ft)
- Population (2023): 139
  - Density: 20.4/km^{2} (52.7/sq mi)
- Time zone: UTC+01:00 (CET)
  - Summer (DST): UTC+02:00 (CEST)
- INSEE/Postal code: 80658 /80400
- ^{1} French Land Register data, which excludes lakes, ponds, glaciers > 1 km^{2} (0.386 sq mi or 247 acres) and river estuaries.

Quivières (French pronunciation: [kivjɛʁ]) is a commune in the Somme department in Hauts-de-France in northern France.

== Geography ==
The commune is situated on the D145 road, some 15 miles (24 km) west of Saint-Quentin.

== Population ==
Historical population
Year	Pop.	±% p.a.
1968	160	—
1975	178	+1.53%
1982	179	+0.08%
1990	189	+0.68%
1999	178	−0.66%
2007	173	−0.36%
2012	163	−1.18%
2017	142	−2.72%
2023	139	−0.36%
Source: INSEE

== See also ==
- Communes of the Somme department
