= Breuil, Somme =

Breuil
- Commune
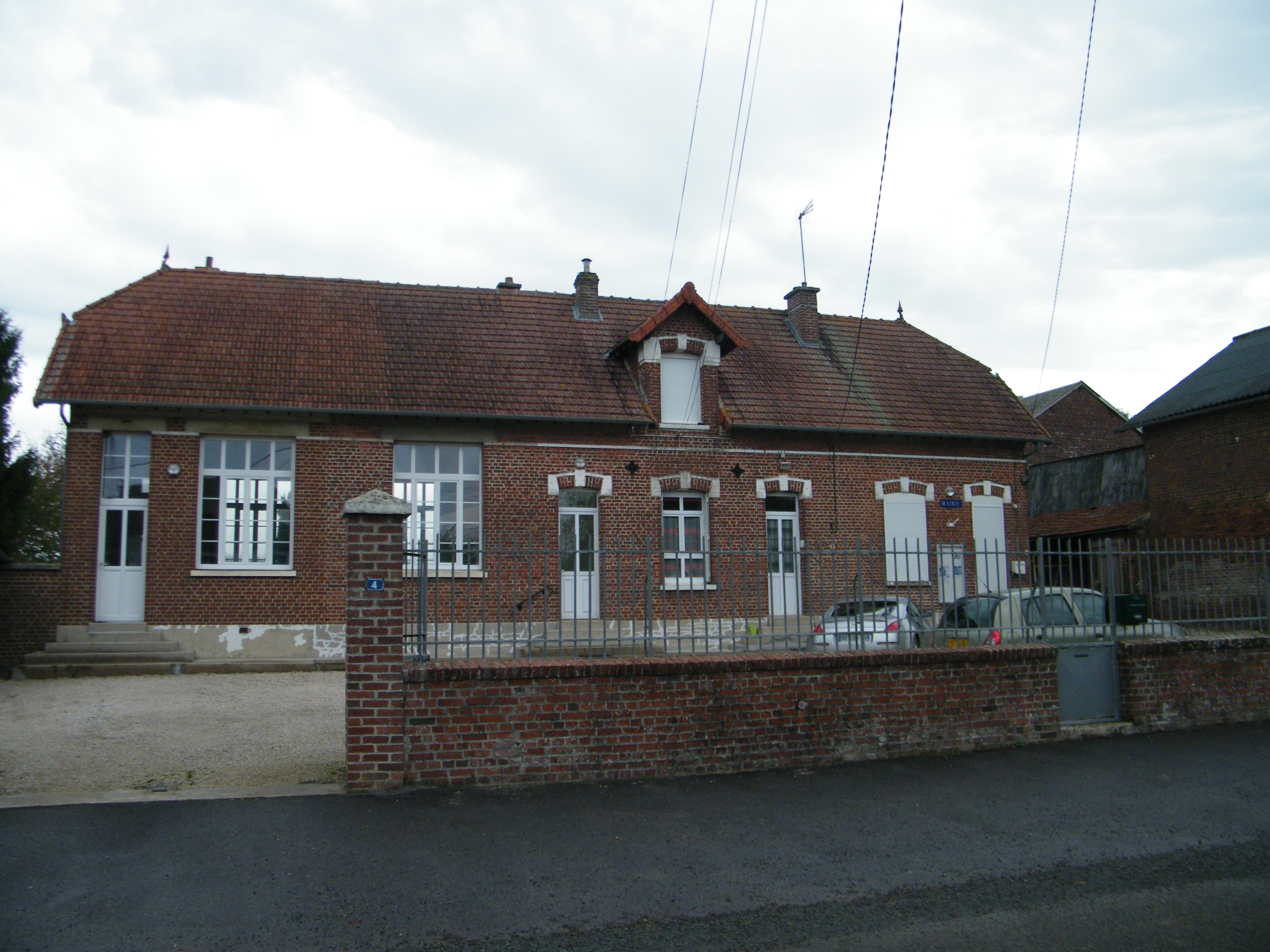
- The town hall and school in Breuil
- Location of Breuil
- Location within France Location within Hauts-de-France
- Coordinates: 49°44′15″N 2°57′19″E
- Country: France
- Region: Hauts-de-France
- Department: Somme
- Arrondissement: Péronne
- Canton: Ham
- Intercommunality: CC Est de la Somme

Government
  - Mayor (2020–2026): Charles de Witasse Thézy
- Area^{1}: 2.17 km^{2} (0.84 sq mi)
- Elevation: 70 m (230 ft)
- Highest elevation: 73 m (240 ft)
- Lowest elevation: 57 m (187 ft)
- Population (2023): 45
  - Density: 21/km^{2} (54/sq mi)
- Time zone: UTC+01:00 (CET)
  - Summer (DST): UTC+02:00 (CEST)
- INSEE/Postal code: 80139 /80400
- ^{1} French Land Register data, which excludes lakes, ponds, glaciers > 1 km^{2} (0.386 sq mi or 247 acres) and river estuaries.

Breuil (French pronunciation: [bʁœj]) is a commune in the Somme department in Hauts-de-France in northern France.

== Population ==
Historical population
Year	Pop.	±% p.a.
1968	96	—
1975	68	−4.81%
1982	59	−2.01%
1990	69	+1.98%
1999	66	−0.49%
2007	50	−3.41%
2012	57	+2.66%
2017	46	−4.20%
2023	45	−0.37%
Source: INSEE

== See also ==
- Communes of the Somme department
