= Matigny =

- Commune
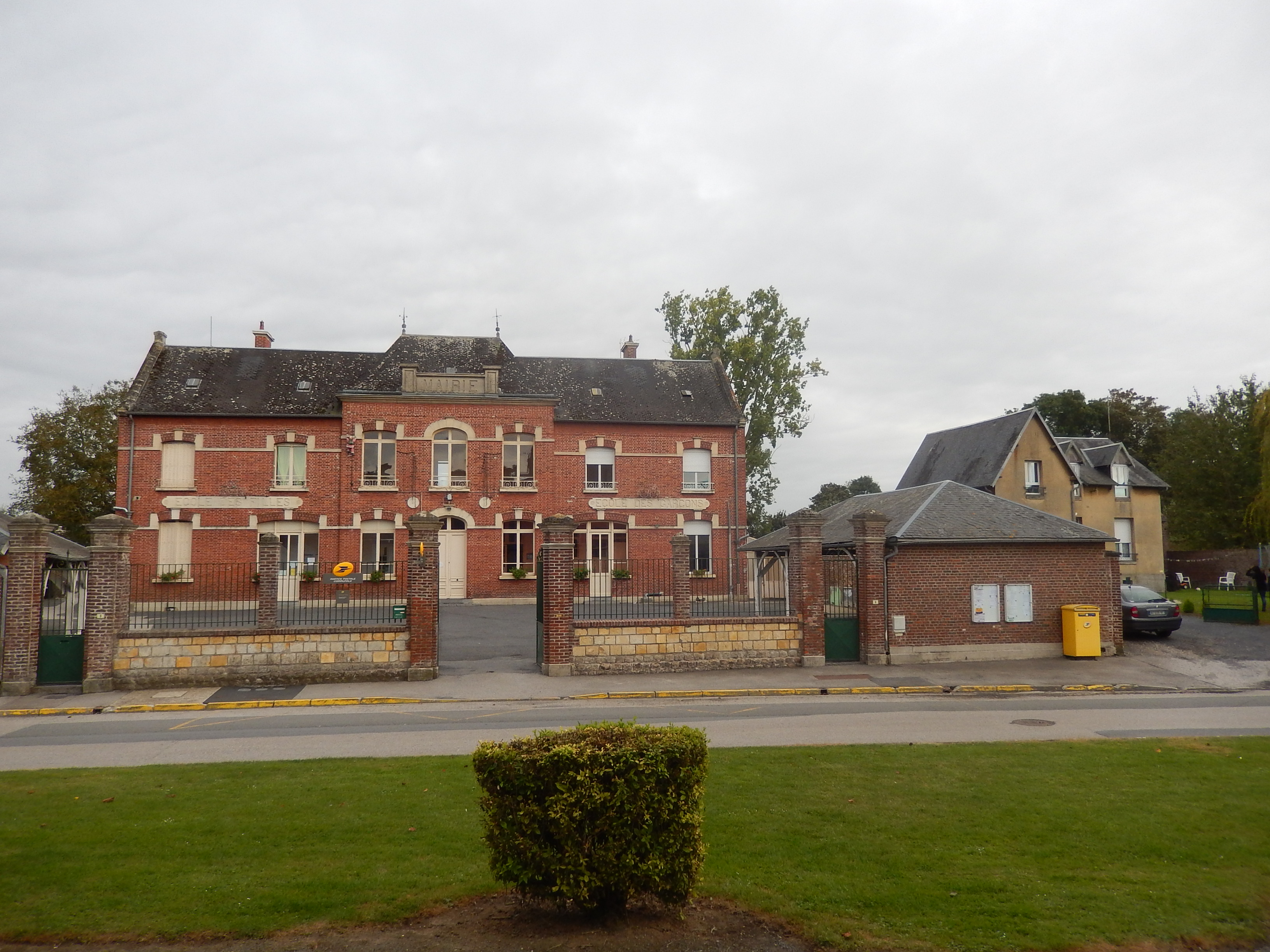
- The town hall in Matigny
- Location of Matigny
- Location within France Location within Hauts-de-France
- Coordinates: 49°47′46″N 3°00′32″E
- Country: France
- Region: Hauts-de-France
- Department: Somme
- Arrondissement: Péronne
- Canton: Ham
- Intercommunality: CC Est de la Somme

Government
  - Mayor (2020–2026): Marie-Elisabeth Cartigny
- Area^{1}: 6.99 km^{2} (2.70 sq mi)
- Elevation: 74 m (243 ft)
- Highest elevation: 82 m (269 ft)
- Lowest elevation: 57 m (187 ft)
- Population (2023): 505
  - Density: 72.2/km^{2} (187/sq mi)
- Time zone: UTC+01:00 (CET)
  - Summer (DST): UTC+02:00 (CEST)
- INSEE/Postal code: 80519 /80400
- ^{1} French Land Register data, which excludes lakes, ponds, glaciers > 1 km^{2} (0.386 sq mi or 247 acres) and river estuaries.

Matigny (French pronunciation: [matiɲi]) is a commune in the Somme department in Hauts-de-France in northern France.

== Geography ==
Matigny is situated on the D937 road, some 15 miles (24 km) west of Saint-Quentin.

== Population ==
Historical population
Year	Pop.	±% p.a.
1968	557	—
1975	538	−0.49%
1982	514	−0.65%
1990	504	−0.25%
1999	511	+0.15%
2007	508	−0.07%
2012	517	+0.35%
2017	503	−0.55%
2023	505	+0.07%
Source: INSEE

== See also ==
- Communes of the Somme department
