= Pithon =

- Commune
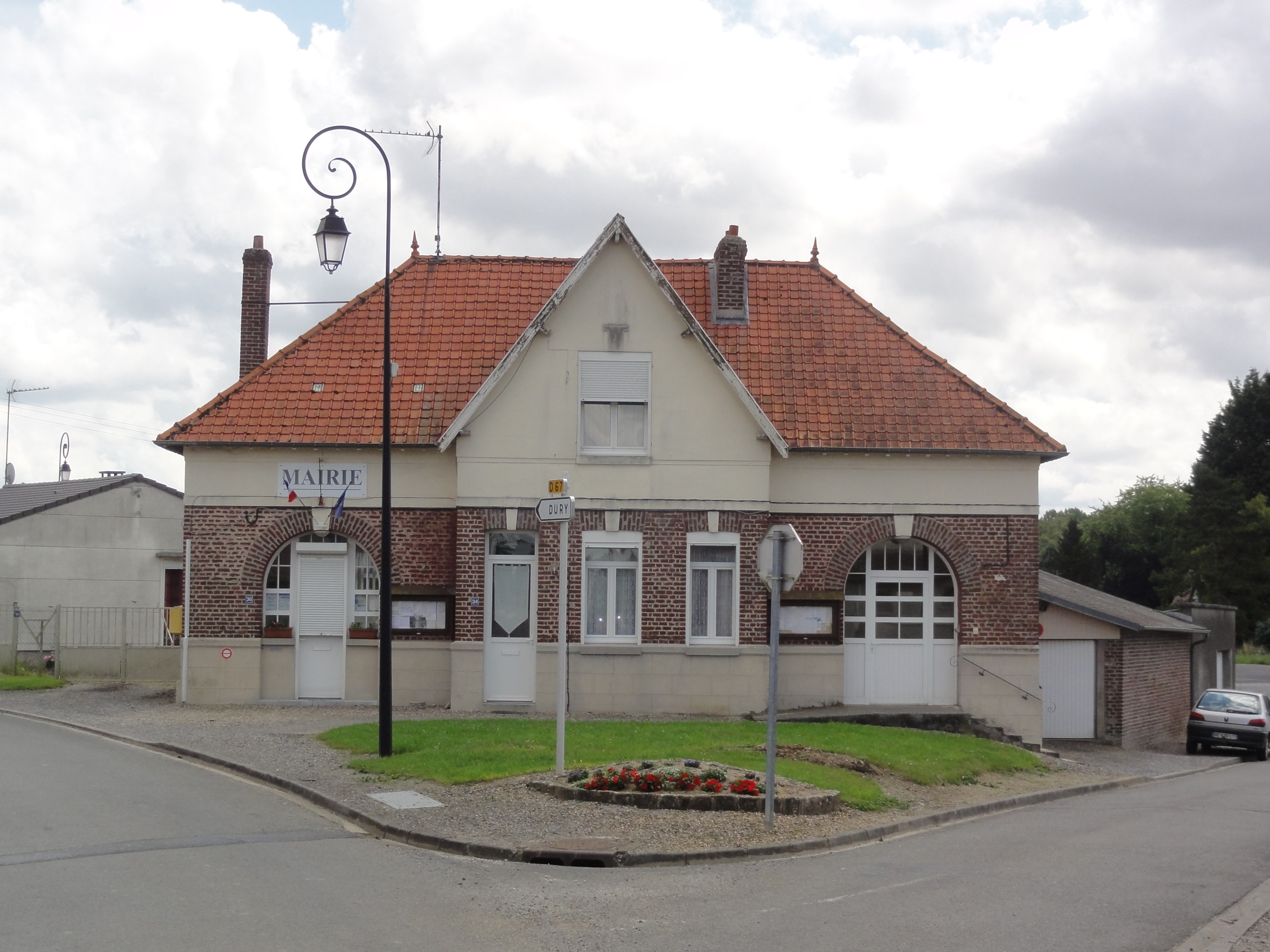
- The town hall of Pithon

- Coat of arms
- Location of Pithon
- Location within France Location within Hauts-de-France
- Coordinates: 49°45′14″N 3°05′53″E
- Country: France
- Region: Hauts-de-France
- Department: Aisne
- Arrondissement: Saint-Quentin
- Canton: Ribemont
- Intercommunality: CC Est de la Somme

Government
  - Mayor (2026–32): Caroline Gense
- Area^{1}: 2.44 km^{2} (0.94 sq mi)
- Elevation: 66 m (217 ft)
- Highest elevation: 88 m (289 ft)
- Lowest elevation: 60 m (200 ft)
- Population (2023): 78
  - Density: 32/km^{2} (83/sq mi)
- Time zone: UTC+01:00 (CET)
  - Summer (DST): UTC+02:00 (CEST)
- INSEE/Postal code: 02604 /02480
- ^{1} French Land Register data, which excludes lakes, ponds, glaciers > 1 km^{2} (0.386 sq mi or 247 acres) and river estuaries.

Pithon (French pronunciation: [pitɔ̃]) is a commune in the Aisne department in Hauts-de-France in northern France.

== Population ==
Historical population
Year	Pop.	±% p.a.
1968	86	—
1975	88	+0.33%
1982	92	+0.64%
1990	110	+2.26%
1999	98	−1.28%
2007	84	−1.91%
2012	71	−3.31%
2017	83	+3.17%
2023	78	−1.03%
Source: INSEE

== See also ==
- Communes of the Aisne department
