= Eppeville =

- Commune
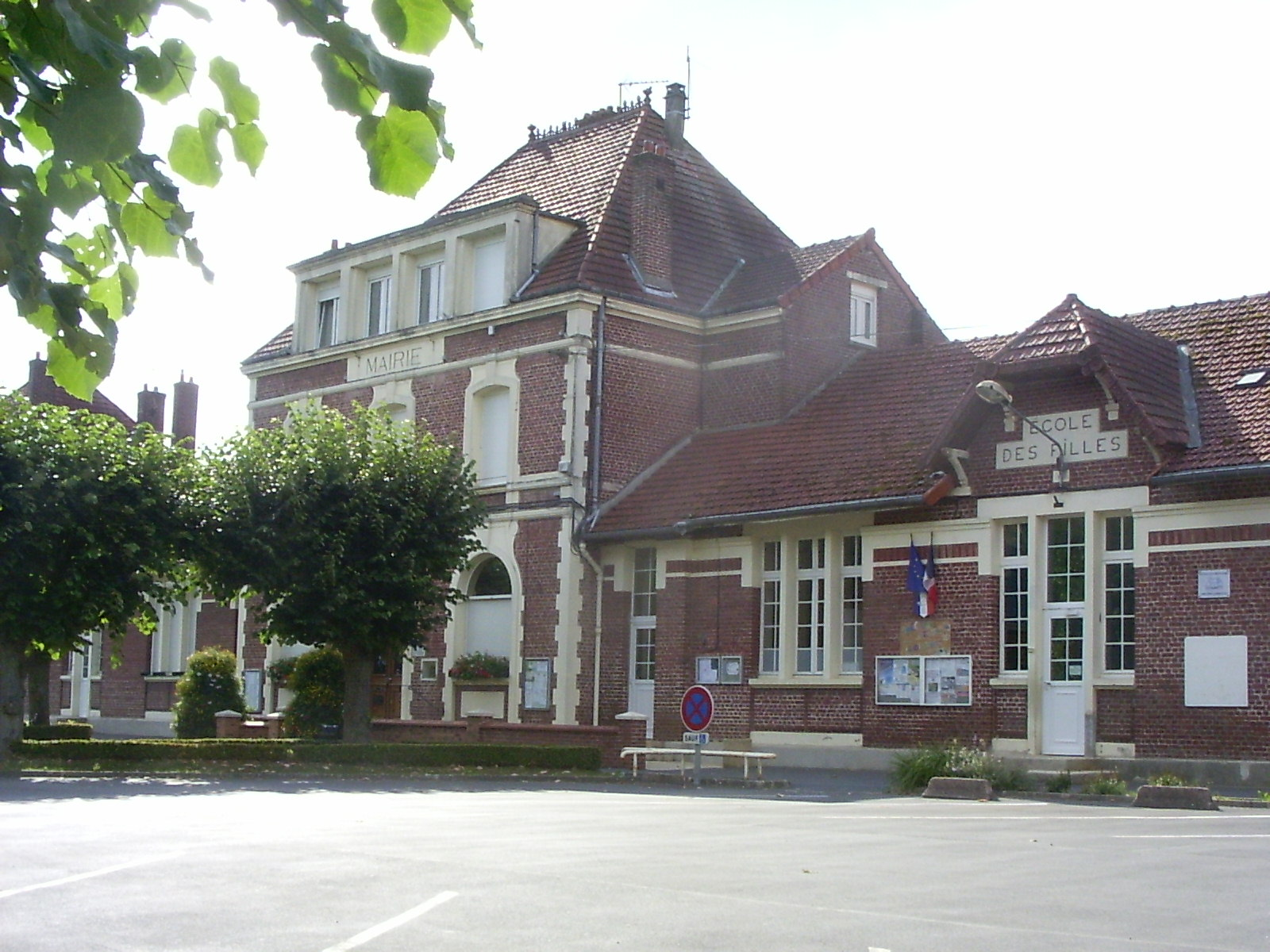
- The town hall in Eppeville

- Coat of arms
- Location of Eppeville
- Location within France Location within Hauts-de-France
- Coordinates: 49°44′33″N 3°03′04″E
- Country: France
- Region: Hauts-de-France
- Department: Somme
- Arrondissement: Péronne
- Canton: Ham
- Intercommunality: CC Est de la Somme

Government
  - Mayor (2020–2026): Christophe Vassent
- Area^{1}: 4.95 km^{2} (1.91 sq mi)
- Elevation: 91 m (299 ft)
- Highest elevation: 74 m (243 ft)
- Lowest elevation: 57 m (187 ft)
- Population (2023): 1,704
  - Density: 344/km^{2} (892/sq mi)
- Time zone: UTC+01:00 (CET)
  - Summer (DST): UTC+02:00 (CEST)
- INSEE/Postal code: 80274 /80400
- ^{1} French Land Register data, which excludes lakes, ponds, glaciers > 1 km^{2} (0.386 sq mi or 247 acres) and river estuaries.

Eppeville (Picard: Éppeville) is a commune in the Somme department in Hauts-de-France in northern France.

== Geography ==
Eppeville is situated on the D932 road, on the banks of the river Somme, some 14 miles (23 km) southwest of Saint-Quentin.

== Population ==
Historical population
Year	Pop.	±% p.a.
1968	2,279	—
1975	2,233	−0.29%
1982	2,193	−0.26%
1990	2,127	−0.38%
1999	2,015	−0.60%
2007	1,928	−0.55%
2012	1,876	−0.55%
2017	1,816	−0.65%
2023	1,704	−1.06%
Source: INSEE

== See also ==
- Communes of the Somme department
