= Ugny-l'Équipée =

- Commune
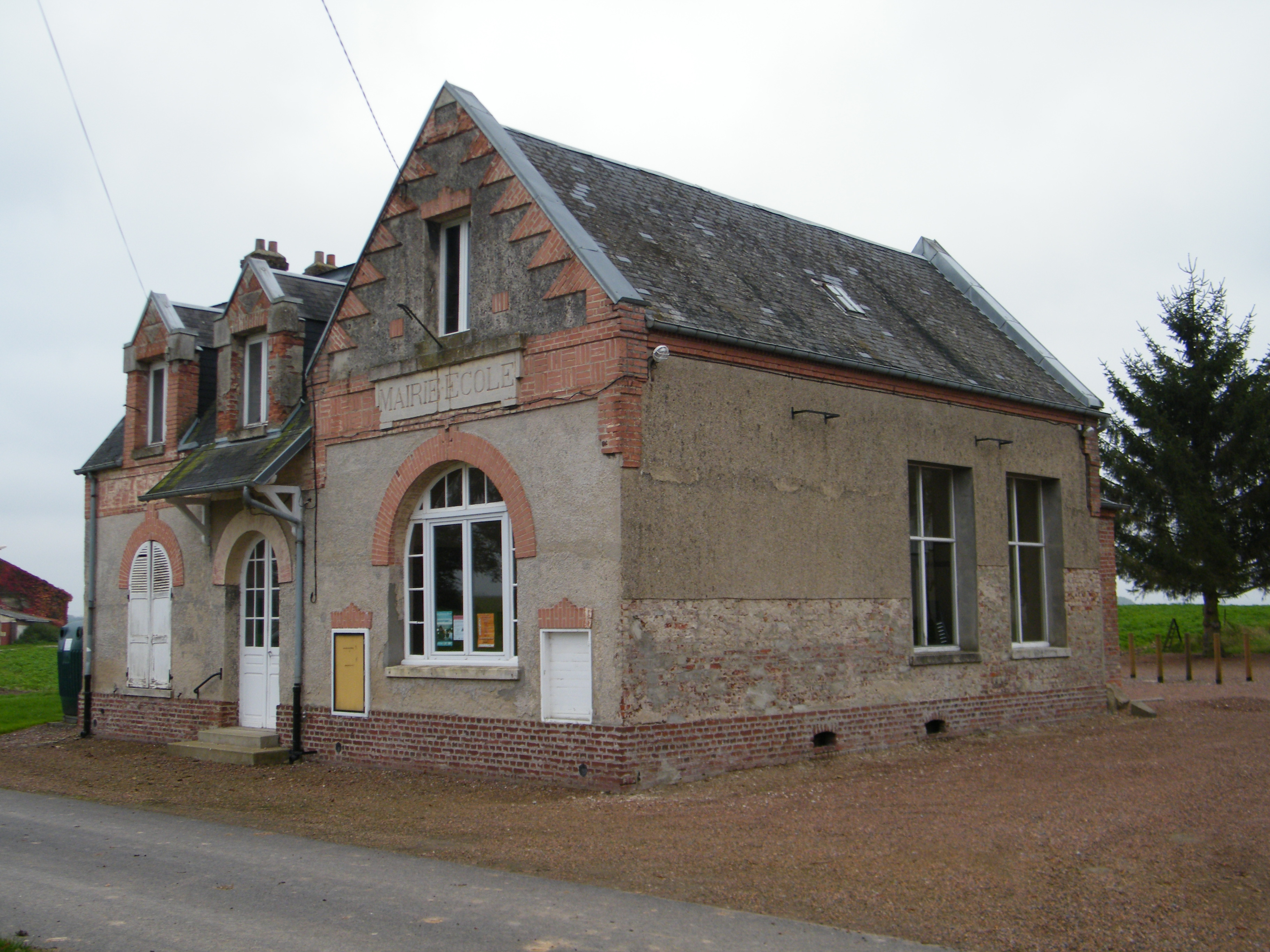
- The town hall and school in Ugny-l'Equipée
- Location of Ugny-l'Équipée
- Location within France Location within Hauts-de-France
- Coordinates: 49°49′05″N 3°03′45″E
- Country: France
- Region: Hauts-de-France
- Department: Somme
- Arrondissement: Péronne
- Canton: Ham
- Intercommunality: CC Est de la Somme

Government
  - Mayor (2020–2026): Jean-Pierre Delville
- Area^{1}: 2.85 km^{2} (1.10 sq mi)
- Elevation: 85 m (279 ft)
- Highest elevation: 91 m (299 ft)
- Lowest elevation: 71 m (233 ft)
- Population (2023): 29
  - Density: 10/km^{2} (26/sq mi)
- Time zone: UTC+01:00 (CET)
  - Summer (DST): UTC+02:00 (CEST)
- INSEE/Postal code: 80771 /80400
- ^{1} French Land Register data, which excludes lakes, ponds, glaciers > 1 km^{2} (0.386 sq mi or 247 acres) and river estuaries.

Ugny-l'Équipée (French pronunciation: [yɲi lekipe]) is a commune in the Somme department in Hauts-de-France in northern France.

== Geography ==
The commune is situated 63 kilometres (39 mi) east of Amiens, on the D145 road and on the border with the département of Aisne.

== Population ==
Historical population
Year	Pop.	±% p.a.
1968	44	—
1975	48	+1.25%
1982	46	−0.61%
1990	57	+2.72%
1999	46	−2.35%
2007	42	−1.13%
2012	41	−0.48%
2017	40	−0.49%
2023	29	−5.22%
Source: INSEE

== See also ==
- Communes of the Somme department
