= Épénancourt =

- Commune
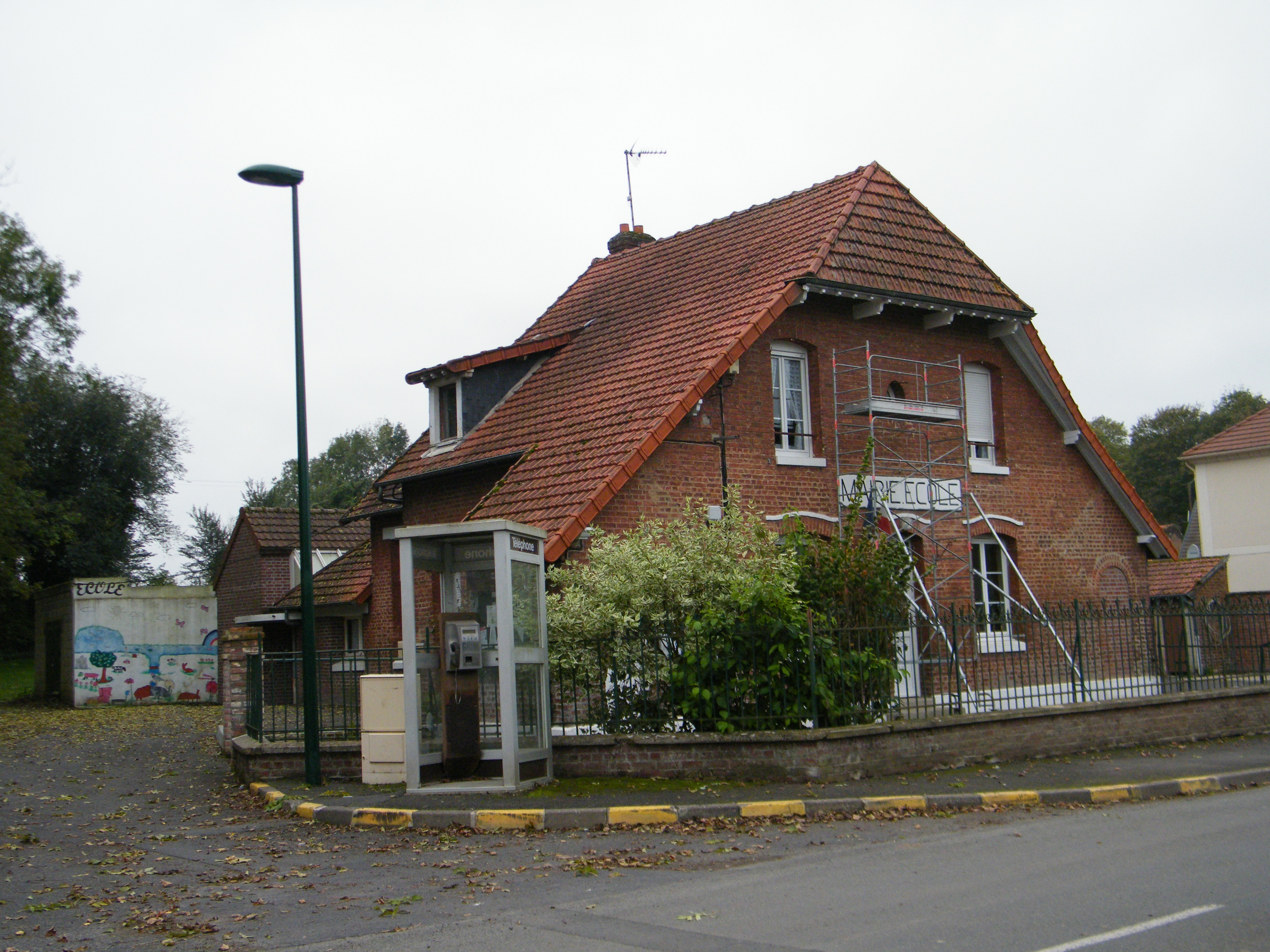
- Town hall
- Location of Épénancourt
- Location within France Location within Hauts-de-France
- Coordinates: 49°49′25″N 2°55′53″E
- Country: France
- Region: Hauts-de-France
- Department: Somme
- Arrondissement: Péronne
- Canton: Ham
- Intercommunality: CC Est de la Somme

Government
  - Mayor (2020–2026): Pascal Blondelle
- Area^{1}: 3.5 km^{2} (1.4 sq mi)
- Elevation: 60 m (200 ft)
- Highest elevation: 92 m (302 ft)
- Lowest elevation: 50 m (160 ft)
- Population (2023): 129
  - Density: 37/km^{2} (95/sq mi)
- Time zone: UTC+01:00 (CET)
  - Summer (DST): UTC+02:00 (CEST)
- INSEE/Postal code: 80272 /80190
- ^{1} French Land Register data, which excludes lakes, ponds, glaciers > 1 km^{2} (0.386 sq mi or 247 acres) and river estuaries.

Épénancourt (French pronunciation: [epenɑ̃kuʁ]; Picard: Èpnancourt ) is a commune in the Somme department in Hauts-de-France in northern France.

== Geography ==
Épénancourt is situated on the banks of the river Somme and on the D62 road, just off the A29 motorway, some 31 km (19 mi) west of Saint-Quentin.

== Population ==
Historical population
Year	Pop.	±% p.a.
1968	125	—
1975	121	−0.46%
1982	124	+0.35%
1990	124	+0.00%
1999	128	+0.35%
2007	95	−3.66%
2012	120	+4.78%
2017	123	+0.50%
2023	129	+0.80%
Source: INSEE

== See also ==
- Communes of the Somme department
