= Languevoisin-Quiquery =

- Commune
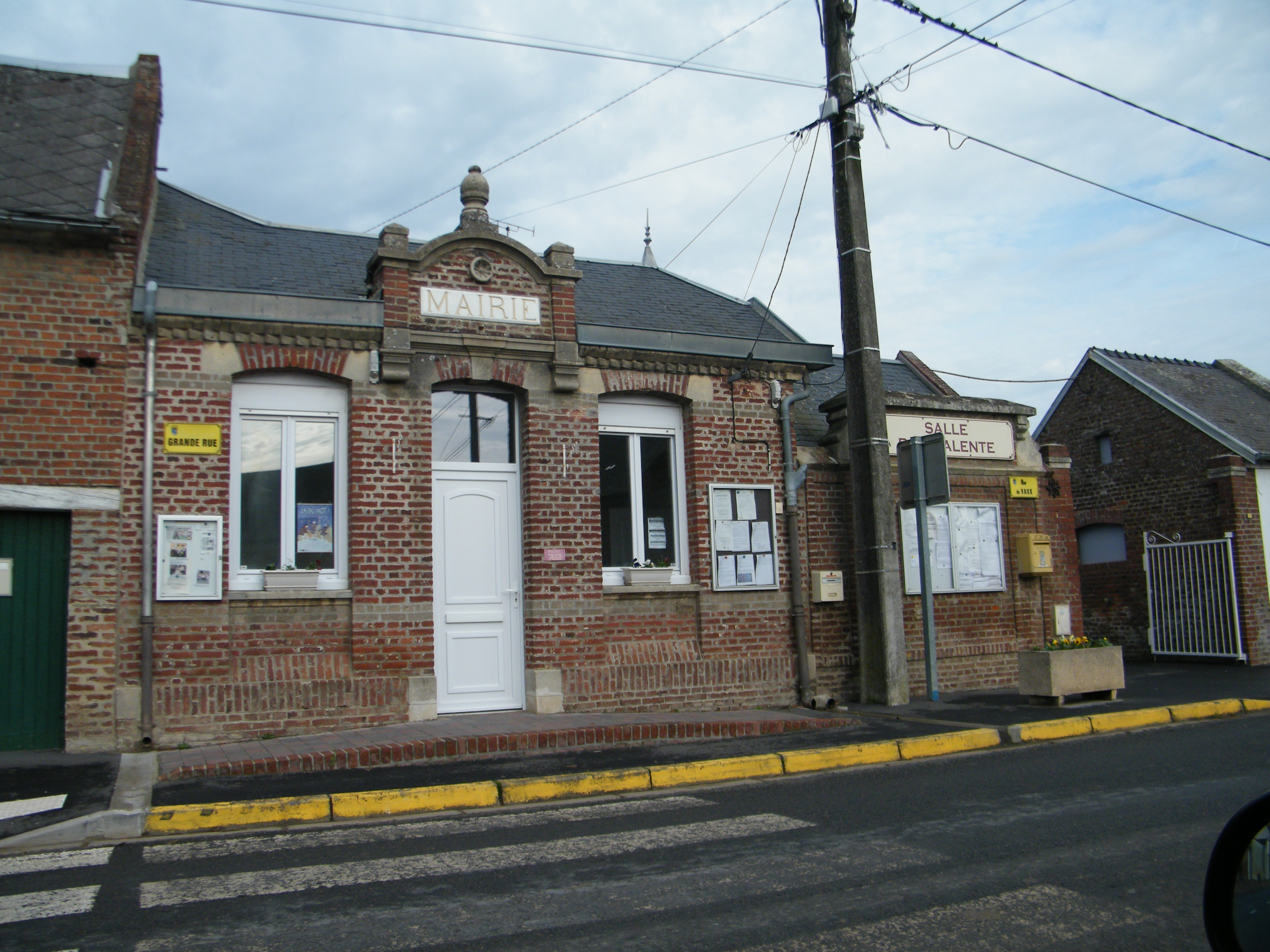
- The town hall in Languevoisin-Quiquery
- Location of Languevoisin-Quiquery
- Location within France Location within Hauts-de-France
- Coordinates: 49°44′54″N 2°55′55″E
- Country: France
- Region: Hauts-de-France
- Department: Somme
- Arrondissement: Péronne
- Canton: Ham
- Intercommunality: CC Est de la Somme

Government
  - Mayor (2024–2026): Christine Zurich
- Area^{1}: 4.83 km^{2} (1.86 sq mi)
- Elevation: 74 m (243 ft)
- Highest elevation: 78 m (256 ft)
- Lowest elevation: 183 m (600 ft)
- Population (2023): 192
  - Density: 39.8/km^{2} (103/sq mi)
- Time zone: UTC+01:00 (CET)
  - Summer (DST): UTC+02:00 (CEST)
- INSEE/Postal code: 80465 /80190
- ^{1} French Land Register data, which excludes lakes, ponds, glaciers > 1 km^{2} (0.386 sq mi or 247 acres) and river estuaries.

Languevoisin-Quiquery (French pronunciation: [lɑ̃ɡvwazɛ̃ kikʁi]; Picard: Languevoésin-Ch’Cucry) is a commune in the Somme department in Hauts-de-France in northern France.

== Geography ==
The commune is situated on the D89 road, some 40 miles (64 km) southeast of Amiens, close to the border with the département of Oise.

== Population ==
Historical population
Year	Pop.	±% p.a.
1968	211	—
1975	211	+0.00%
1982	215	+0.27%
1990	206	−0.53%
1999	211	+0.27%
2007	210	−0.06%
2012	197	−1.27%
2017	195	−0.20%
2023	192	−0.26%
Source: INSEE

== See also ==
- Communes of the Somme department
