= Falvy =

- Commune
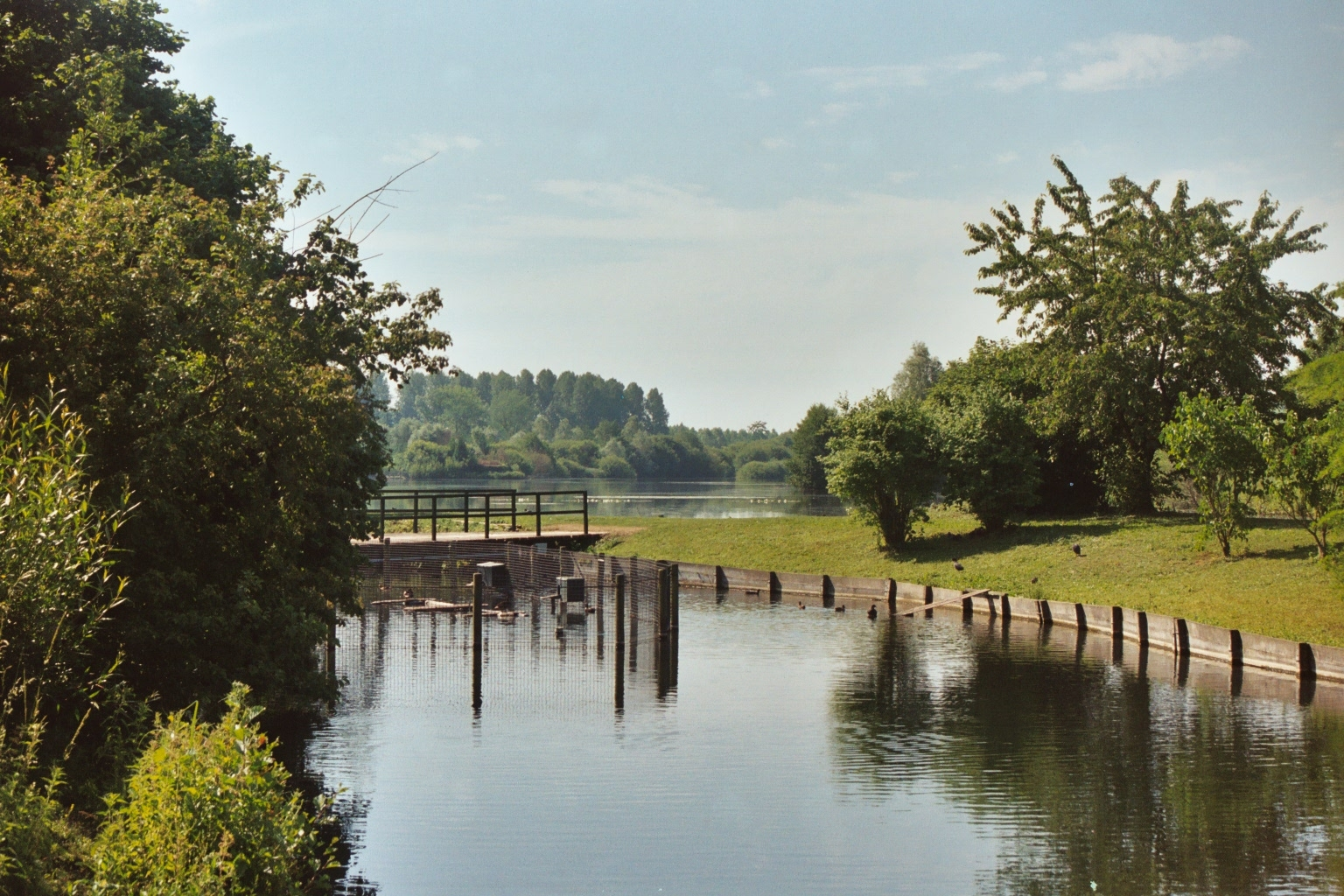
- Falvy Lake

- Coat of arms
- Location of Falvy
- Location within France Location within Hauts-de-France
- Coordinates: 49°49′30″N 2°57′35″E
- Country: France
- Region: Hauts-de-France
- Department: Somme
- Arrondissement: Péronne
- Canton: Ham
- Intercommunality: CC Est de la Somme

Government
  - Mayor (2020–2026): Frédéric Lecomte
- Area^{1}: 6.32 km^{2} (2.44 sq mi)
- Elevation: 60 m (200 ft)
- Highest elevation: 91 m (299 ft)
- Lowest elevation: 51 m (167 ft)
- Population (2023): 163
  - Density: 25.8/km^{2} (66.8/sq mi)
- Time zone: UTC+01:00 (CET)
  - Summer (DST): UTC+02:00 (CEST)
- INSEE/Postal code: 80300 /80190
- ^{1} French Land Register data, which excludes lakes, ponds, glaciers > 1 km^{2} (0.386 sq mi or 247 acres) and river estuaries.

Falvy (French pronunciation: [falvi]) is a commune in the Somme department in Hauts-de-France in northern France.

== Geography ==
Falvy is situated on the D103 road, on the banks of the river Somme, some 19 miles (31 km) west of Saint-Quentin.

== History ==
Falvy originated as a Gaulish village. Known by different names over the centuries :Fala, Falvicum in 1135, Phalevi in 1146, then Fallevy or Falevi sur Somme and finally Falvy Principle events :

- In the 12th century, Raoul I de Nesle, seigneur of both Nesle and Falvy, gave the windmill of Falvy-sur-Somme to the church at Saint-Quentin.
- 1629 and Louis XIII dismantles the château, a medieval fortress
- On 22 November 1916, fighter-ace-pilot Georges Guynemer claimed his 23rd victim at Falvy.
- On 9 August 1918, the bridge at Falvy was attacked by Lieutenant James Alfred Keating, an American volunteer in the RFC. He won the Distinguished Flying Cross.

== Population ==
Historical population
Year	Pop.	±% p.a.
1968	118	—
1975	108	−1.26%
1982	116	+1.03%
1990	106	−1.12%
1999	100	−0.65%
2007	128	+3.13%
2012	134	+0.92%
2017	150	+2.28%
2023	163	+1.39%
Source: INSEE

== Places of interest ==
- The church of Saint Benoite has dimensions that are relative to a time when the population was larger. Its origin was as a chapel to the chateau. It was victim of revolutionary vandalism in 1792, losing much of its embellishment and harmony by such destruction.
- The lake

== See also ==
- Communes of the Somme department
