= Morchain =

- Commune
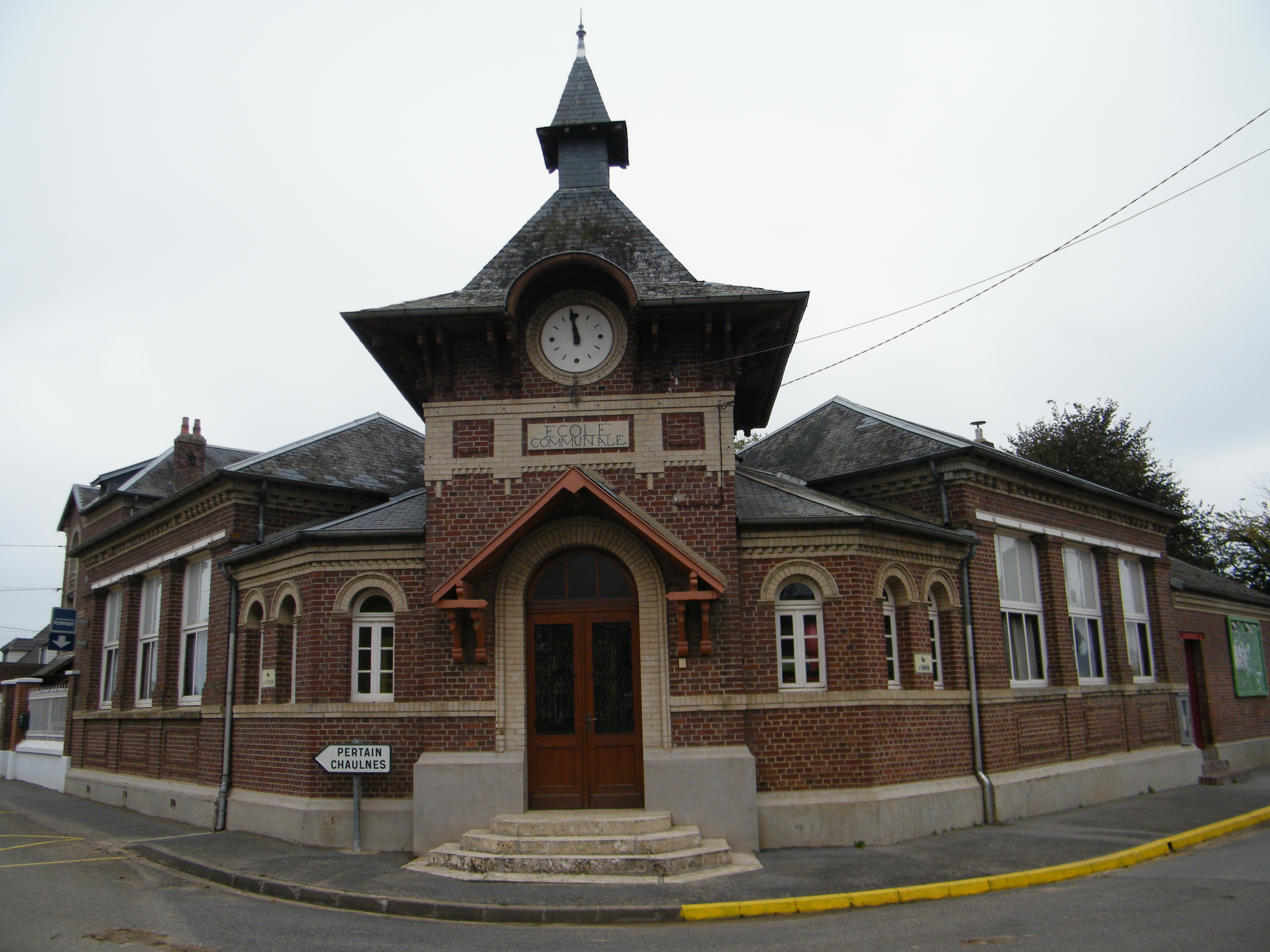
- The school in Morchain
- Location of Morchain
- Location within France Location within Hauts-de-France
- Coordinates: 49°48′10″N 2°54′51″E
- Country: France
- Region: Hauts-de-France
- Department: Somme
- Arrondissement: Péronne
- Canton: Ham
- Intercommunality: CC Est de la Somme

Government
  - Mayor (2020–2026): Jean-Paul Bourgy
- Area^{1}: 5.84 km^{2} (2.25 sq mi)
- Elevation: 80 m (260 ft)
- Highest elevation: 83 m (272 ft)
- Lowest elevation: 61 m (200 ft)
- Population (2023): 362
  - Density: 62.0/km^{2} (161/sq mi)
- Time zone: UTC+01:00 (CET)
  - Summer (DST): UTC+02:00 (CEST)
- INSEE/Postal code: 80568 /80190
- ^{1} French Land Register data, which excludes lakes, ponds, glaciers > 1 km^{2} (0.386 sq mi or 247 acres) and river estuaries.

Morchain (French pronunciation: [mɔʁʃɛ̃]; picard: Mourchin) is a commune in the Somme department in Hauts-de-France in northern France.

== Geography ==
Morchain is situated on the D139 and D142 roads, some 30 miles (48 km) east of Amiens.

== Population ==
Historical population
Year	Pop.	±% p.a.
1968	265	—
1975	239	−1.46%
1982	250	+0.64%
1990	271	+1.01%
1999	248	−0.98%
2007	299	+2.37%
2012	312	+0.85%
2017	352	+2.44%
2023	362	+0.47%
Source: INSEE

== See also ==
- Communes of the Somme department
