= Buverchy =

- Commune
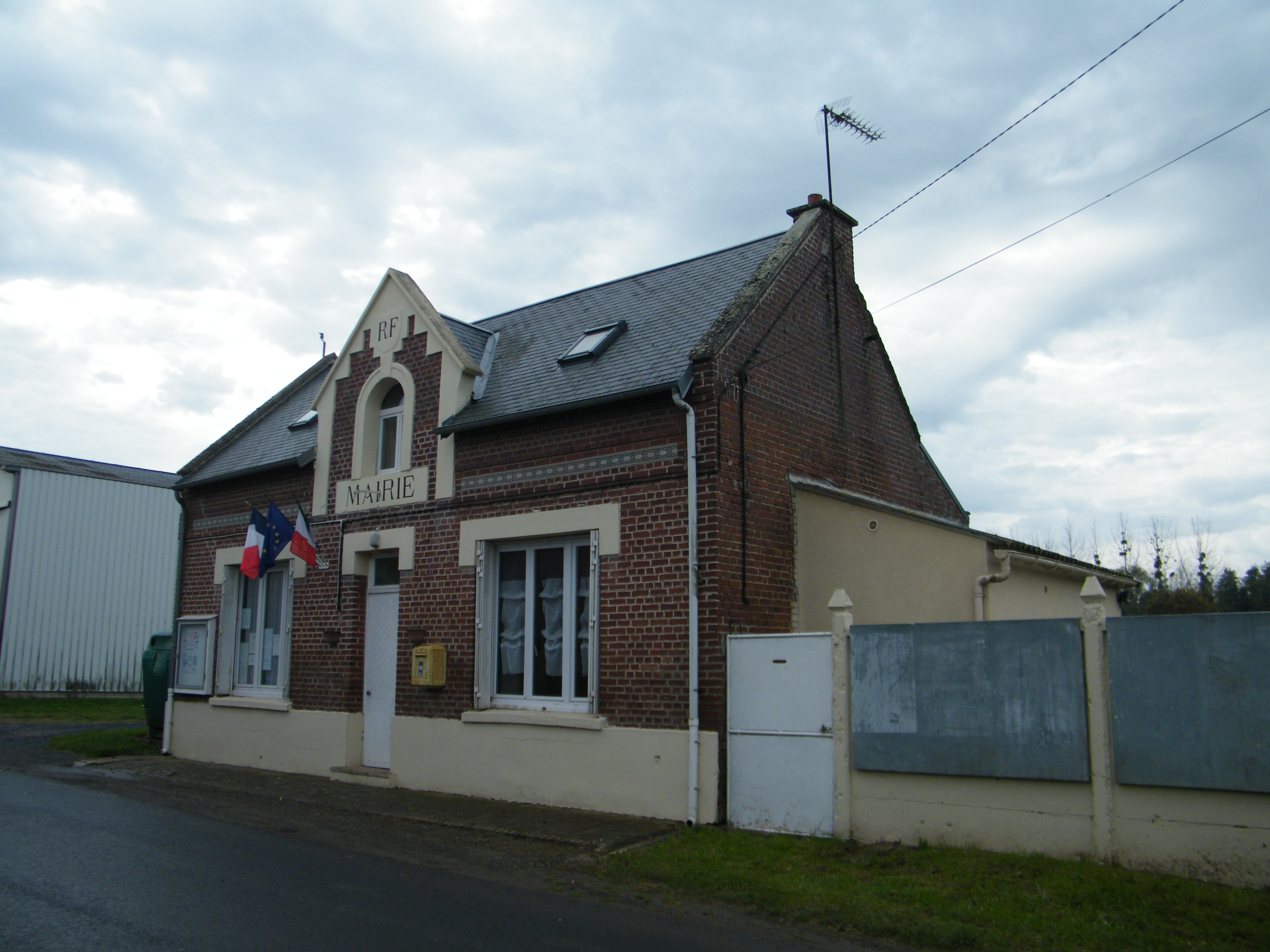
- The town hall in Buverchy
- Location of Buverchy
- Location within France Location within Hauts-de-France
- Coordinates: 49°43′53″N 2°58′16″E
- Country: France
- Region: Hauts-de-France
- Department: Somme
- Arrondissement: Péronne
- Canton: Ham
- Intercommunality: CC Est de la Somme

Government
  - Mayor (2020–2026): Pierre Carpentier
- Area^{1}: 1.85 km^{2} (0.71 sq mi)
- Elevation: 61 m (200 ft)
- Highest elevation: 64 m (210 ft)
- Lowest elevation: 56 m (184 ft)
- Population (2023): 41
  - Density: 22/km^{2} (57/sq mi)
- Time zone: UTC+01:00 (CET)
  - Summer (DST): UTC+02:00 (CEST)
- INSEE/Postal code: 80158 /80400
- ^{1} French Land Register data, which excludes lakes, ponds, glaciers > 1 km^{2} (0.386 sq mi or 247 acres) and river estuaries.

Buverchy (French pronunciation: [byvɛʁʃi]) is a commune in the Somme department in Hauts-de-France in northern France.

== Geography ==
Buverchy is situated on the D154 road, some 18 miles (29 km) southeast of Saint-Quentin.

== Population ==
Historical population
Year	Pop.	±% p.a.
1968	37	—
1975	35	−0.79%
1982	36	+0.40%
1990	50	+4.19%
1999	43	−1.66%
2007	39	−1.21%
2012	42	+1.49%
2017	49	+3.13%
2023	41	−2.93%
Source: INSEE

== See also ==
- Communes of the Somme department
