= Potte =

- Commune
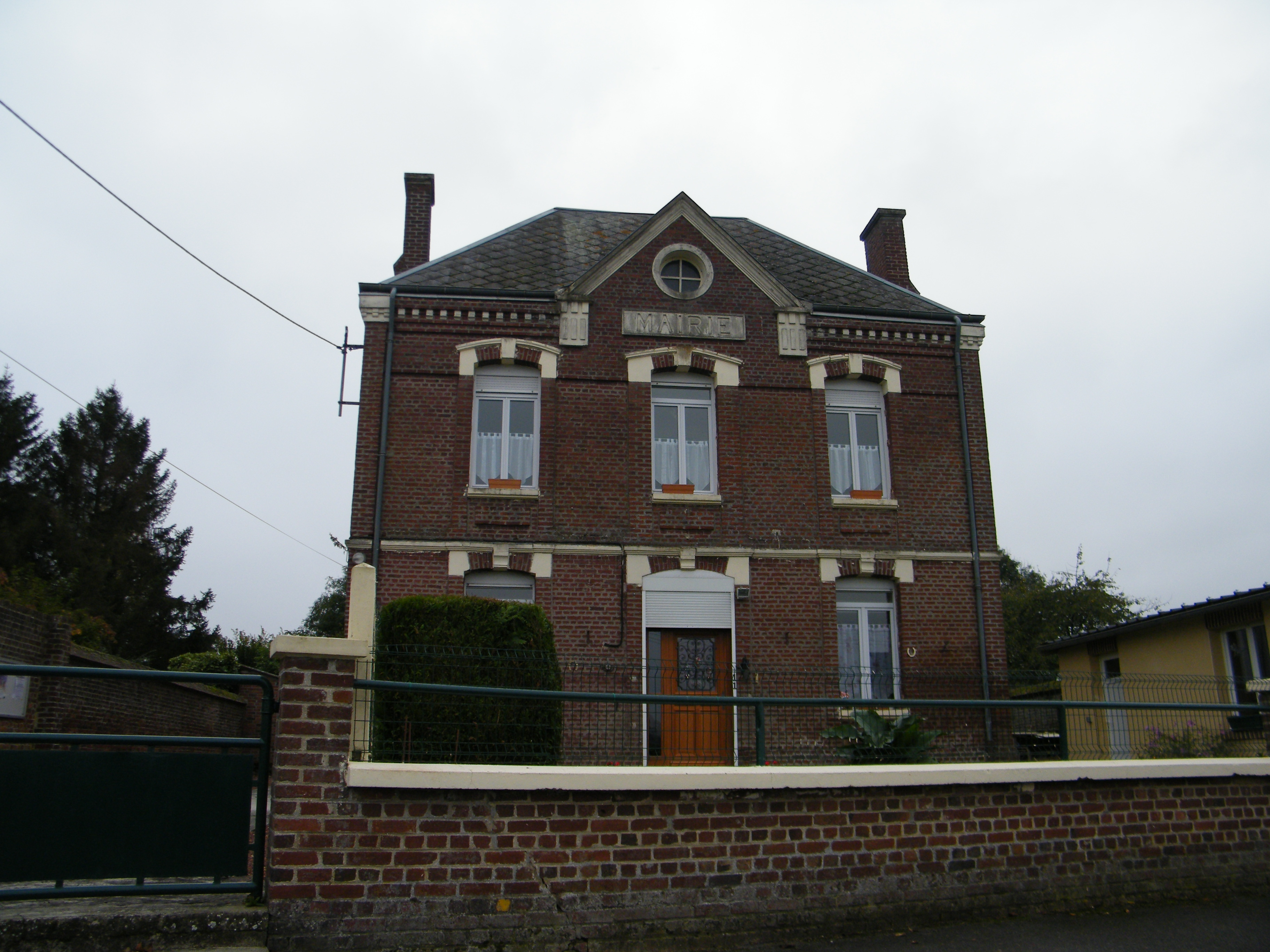
- The town hall in Potte

- Coat of arms
- Location of Potte
- Location within France Location within Hauts-de-France
- Coordinates: 49°47′54″N 2°54′10″E
- Country: France
- Region: Hauts-de-France
- Department: Somme
- Arrondissement: Péronne
- Canton: Ham
- Intercommunality: CC Est de la Somme

Government
  - Mayor (2020–2026): Michel Merel
- Area^{1}: 3.27 km^{2} (1.26 sq mi)
- Elevation: 83 m (272 ft)
- Highest elevation: 87 m (285 ft)
- Lowest elevation: 67 m (220 ft)
- Population (2023): 111
  - Density: 33.9/km^{2} (87.9/sq mi)
- Time zone: UTC+01:00 (CET)
  - Summer (DST): UTC+02:00 (CEST)
- INSEE/Postal code: 80638 /80190
- ^{1} French Land Register data, which excludes lakes, ponds, glaciers > 1 km^{2} (0.386 sq mi or 247 acres) and river estuaries.

Potte (French pronunciation: [pɔt]) is a commune in the Somme department in Hauts-de-France in northern France.

== Geography ==
Potte is situated on the D139 and D35 crossroads, some 30 miles (48 km) east of Amiens.

== Population ==
Historical population
Year	Pop.	±% p.a.
1968	91	—
1975	83	−1.31%
1982	84	+0.17%
1990	77	−1.08%
1999	84	+0.97%
2007	98	+1.95%
2012	117	+3.61%
2017	103	−2.52%
2023	111	+1.25%
Source: INSEE

== See also ==
- Communes of the Somme department
