= Offoy, Somme =

Offoy
- Commune
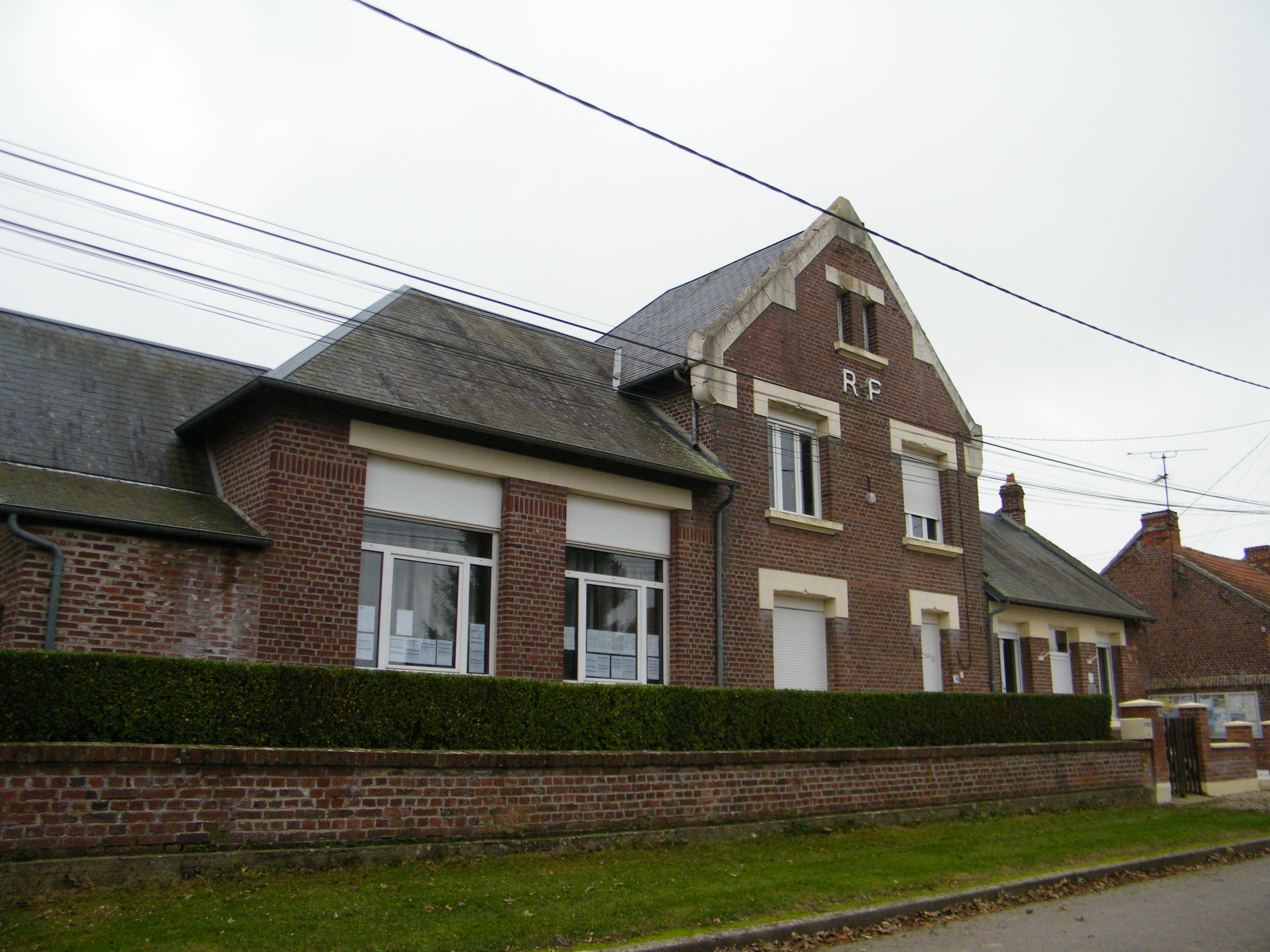
- The town hall and school in Offoy

- Coat of arms
- Location of Offoy
- Location within France Location within Hauts-de-France
- Coordinates: 49°45′43″N 3°00′43″E
- Country: France
- Region: Hauts-de-France
- Department: Somme
- Arrondissement: Péronne
- Canton: Ham
- Intercommunality: CC Est de la Somme

Government
  - Mayor (2020–2026): Célestin Joannes
- Area^{1}: 7.1 km^{2} (2.7 sq mi)
- Elevation: 62 m (203 ft)
- Highest elevation: 77 m (253 ft)
- Lowest elevation: 52 m (171 ft)
- Population (2023): 196
  - Density: 28/km^{2} (71/sq mi)
- Time zone: UTC+01:00 (CET)
  - Summer (DST): UTC+02:00 (CEST)
- INSEE/Postal code: 80605 /80400
- ^{1} French Land Register data, which excludes lakes, ponds, glaciers > 1 km^{2} (0.386 sq mi or 247 acres) and river estuaries.

Offoy (French pronunciation: [ɔfwa]) is a commune in the Somme department in Hauts-de-France in northern France.

== Geography ==
Offoy is situated on the D17 road, on the banks of the upper reaches of the river Somme, about 14 miles (23 km) southwest of Saint-Quentin.

== Population ==
Historical population
Year	Pop.	±% p.a.
1968	202	—
1975	212	+0.69%
1982	231	+1.23%
1990	230	−0.05%
1999	224	−0.29%
2007	217	−0.40%
2012	222	+0.46%
2017	217	−0.45%
2023	196	−1.68%
Source: INSEE

== See also ==
- Communes of the Somme department
