= Mesnil-Saint-Nicaise =

- Commune
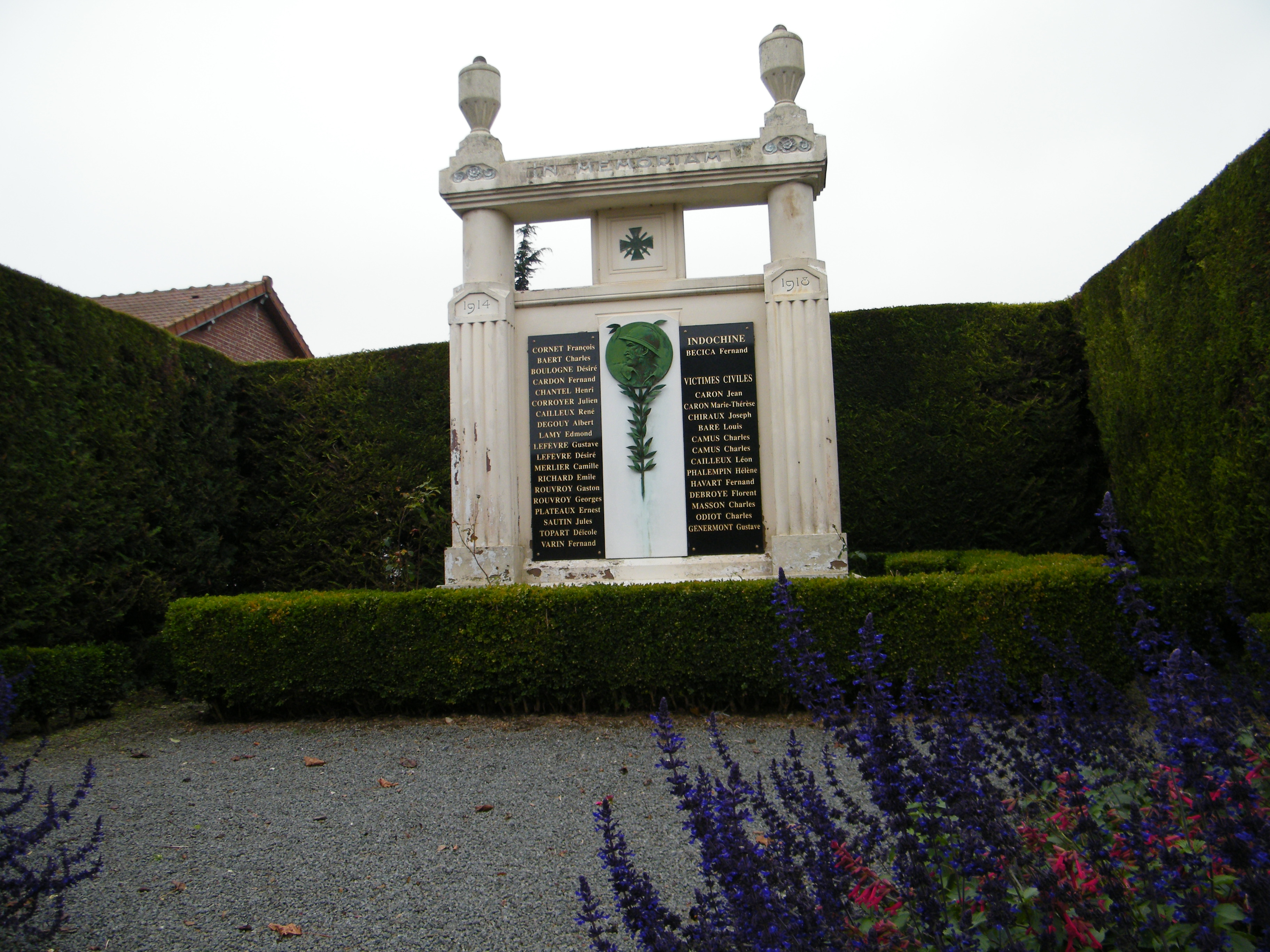
- The war memorial in Mesnil-Saint-Nicaise
- Location of Mesnil-Saint-Nicaise
- Location within France Location within Hauts-de-France
- Coordinates: 49°46′46″N 2°55′19″E
- Country: France
- Region: Hauts-de-France
- Department: Somme
- Arrondissement: Péronne
- Canton: Ham
- Intercommunality: CC Est de la Somme

Government
  - Mayor (2020–2026): Jacques Merlier
- Area^{1}: 6.8 km^{2} (2.6 sq mi)
- Elevation: 79 m (259 ft)
- Highest elevation: 82 m (269 ft)
- Lowest elevation: 65 m (213 ft)
- Population (2023): 569
  - Density: 84/km^{2} (220/sq mi)
- Time zone: UTC+01:00 (CET)
  - Summer (DST): UTC+02:00 (CEST)
- INSEE/Postal code: 80542 /80190
- ^{1} French Land Register data, which excludes lakes, ponds, glaciers > 1 km^{2} (0.386 sq mi or 247 acres) and river estuaries.

Mesnil-Saint-Nicaise (French pronunciation: [menil sɛ̃ nikɛz]) is a commune in the Somme department in Hauts-de-France in northern France.

== Geography ==
The commune is situated on the D19 road, some 16 miles (26 km) southwest of Saint-Quentin.

== Population ==
Historical population
Year	Pop.	±% p.a.
1968	502	—
1975	504	+0.06%
1982	563	+1.59%
1990	504	−1.37%
1999	517	+0.28%
2007	538	+0.50%
2012	567	+1.06%
2017	561	−0.21%
2023	569	+0.24%
Source: INSEE

== See also ==
- Communes of the Somme department
