= Pargny, Somme =

Pargny
- Commune
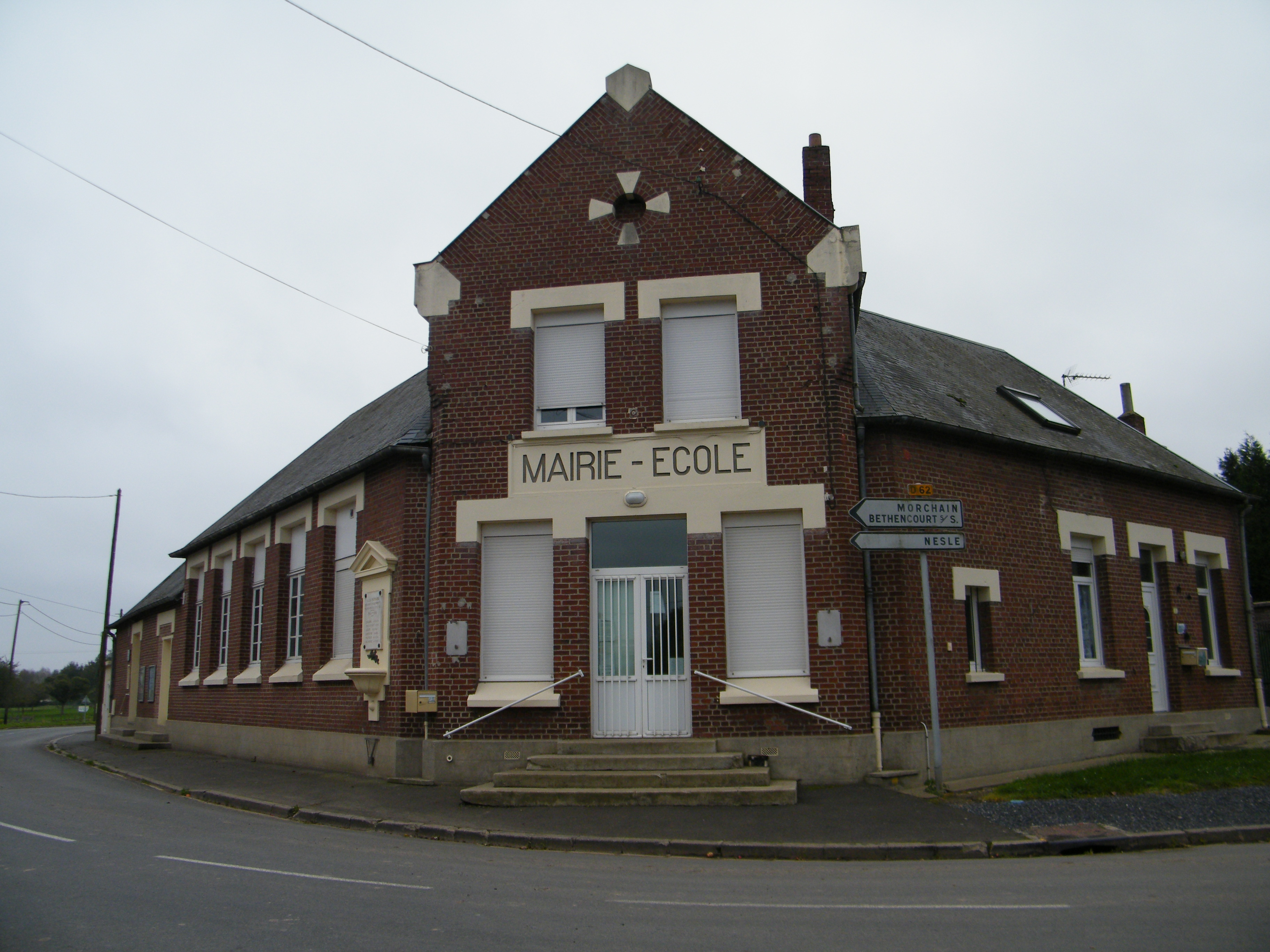
- The town hall and school in Pargny
- Location of Pargny
- Location within France Location within Hauts-de-France
- Coordinates: 49°48′50″N 2°57′09″E
- Country: France
- Region: Hauts-de-France
- Department: Somme
- Arrondissement: Péronne
- Canton: Ham
- Intercommunality: CC Est de la Somme

Government
  - Mayor (2021–2026): Corine Pollard
- Area^{1}: 3.68 km^{2} (1.42 sq mi)
- Elevation: 56 m (184 ft)
- Highest elevation: 83 m (272 ft)
- Lowest elevation: 52 m (171 ft)
- Population (2023): 198
  - Density: 53.8/km^{2} (139/sq mi)
- Time zone: UTC+01:00 (CET)
  - Summer (DST): UTC+02:00 (CEST)
- INSEE/Postal code: 80616 /80190
- ^{1} French Land Register data, which excludes lakes, ponds, glaciers > 1 km^{2} (0.386 sq mi or 247 acres) and river estuaries.

Pargny (French pronunciation: [paʁɲi]) is a commune in the Somme department in Hauts-de-France in northern France.

== Geography ==
Pargny is situated on the D62 and D103 crossroads, some 15 miles (24 km) west of Saint-Quentin.

== Population ==
Historical population
Year	Pop.	±% p.a.
1968	140	—
1975	145	+0.50%
1982	133	−1.23%
1990	145	+1.09%
1999	124	−1.72%
2007	118	−0.62%
2012	189	+9.88%
2017	205	+1.64%
2023	198	−0.58%
Source: INSEE

== See also ==
- Communes of the Somme department
