= Cizancourt =

- Commune
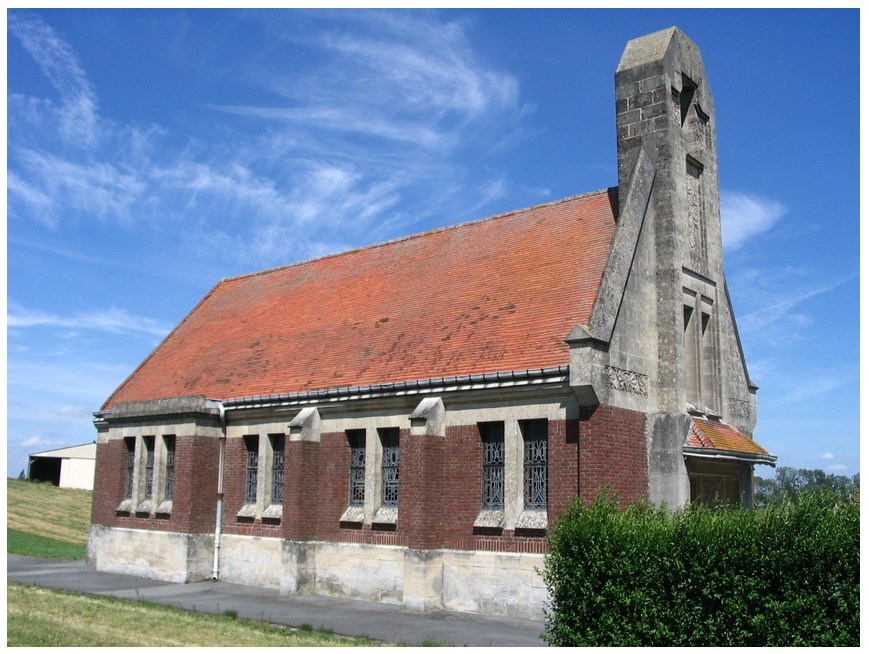
- The church in Cizancourt
- Location of Cizancourt
- Location within France Location within Hauts-de-France
- Coordinates: 49°50′45″N 2°55′24″E
- Country: France
- Region: Hauts-de-France
- Department: Somme
- Arrondissement: Péronne
- Canton: Ham
- Intercommunality: CC Est de la Somme

Government
  - Mayor (2020–2026): Jean-Luc Doutart
- Area^{1}: 1.83 km^{2} (0.71 sq mi)
- Elevation: 53 m (174 ft)
- Highest elevation: 88 m (289 ft)
- Lowest elevation: 48 m (157 ft)
- Population (2023): 30
  - Density: 16/km^{2} (42/sq mi)
- Time zone: UTC+01:00 (CET)
  - Summer (DST): UTC+02:00 (CEST)
- INSEE/Postal code: 80197 /80200
- ^{1} French Land Register data, which excludes lakes, ponds, glaciers > 1 km^{2} (0.386 sq mi or 247 acres) and river estuaries.

Cizancourt (French pronunciation: [sizɑ̃kuʁ]) is a commune in the Somme department in Hauts-de-France in northern France.

== Geography ==
Cizancourt is situated in the east of the département, situated on the D62 road, on the banks of the river Somme, some 20 miles (32 km) west of Saint-Quentin.

== Population ==
Historical population
Year	Pop.	±% p.a.
1968	60	—
1975	50	−2.57%
1982	48	−0.58%
1990	47	−0.26%
1999	37	−2.62%
2007	37	+0.00%
2012	41	+2.07%
2017	34	−3.68%
2023	30	−2.06%
Source: INSEE

== See also ==
- Communes of the Somme department
