= Rouy-le-Grand =

- Commune
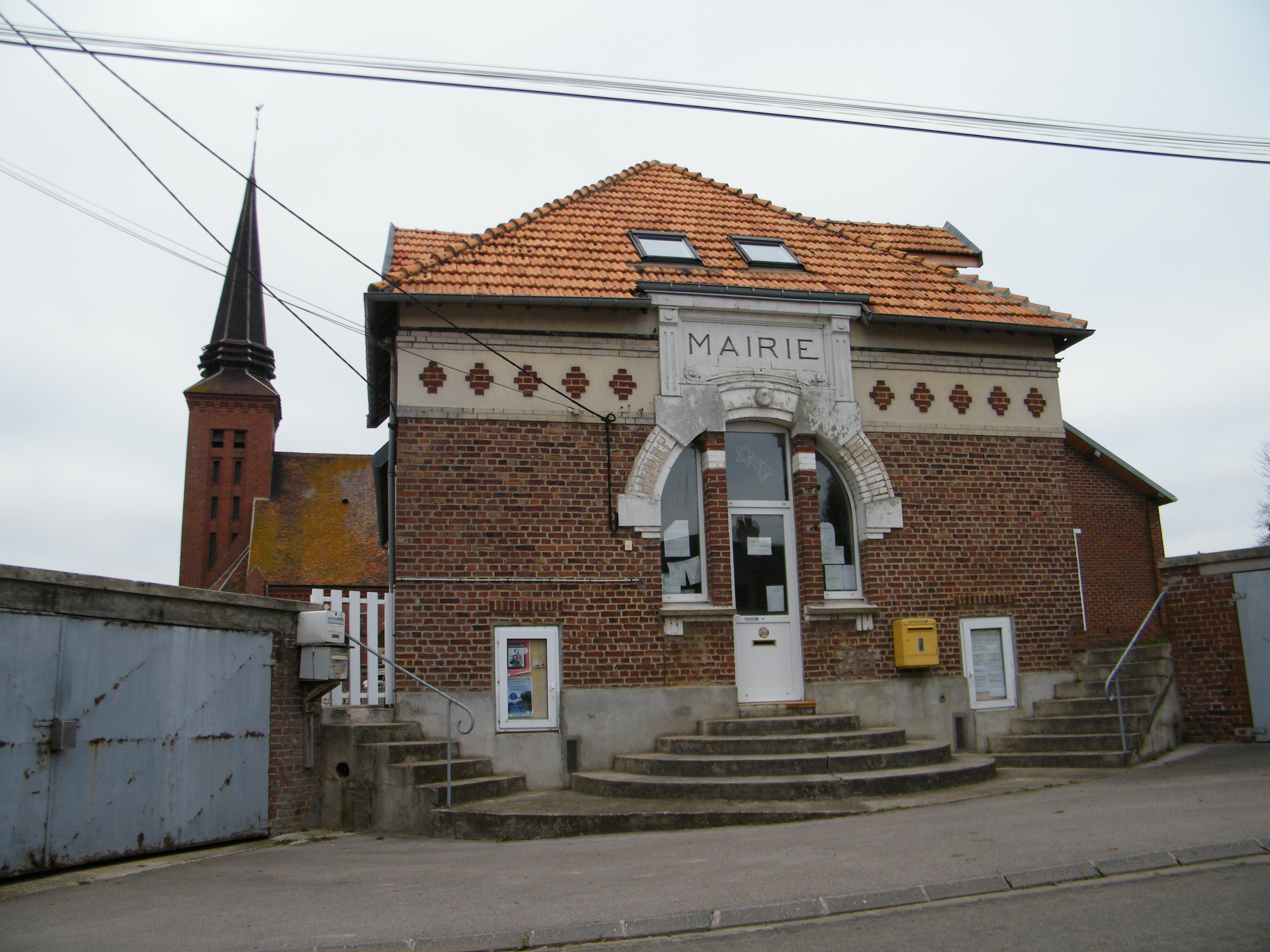
- The town hall in Rouy-le-Grand
- Location of Rouy-le-Grand
- Location within France Location within Hauts-de-France
- Coordinates: 49°46′34″N 2°57′35″E
- Country: France
- Region: Hauts-de-France
- Department: Somme
- Arrondissement: Péronne
- Canton: Ham
- Intercommunality: CC Est de la Somme

Government
  - Mayor (2020–2026): Francis Urier
- Area^{1}: 3.81 km^{2} (1.47 sq mi)
- Elevation: 63 m (207 ft)
- Highest elevation: 79 m (259 ft)
- Lowest elevation: 52 m (171 ft)
- Population (2023): 100
  - Density: 26/km^{2} (68/sq mi)
- Time zone: UTC+01:00 (CET)
  - Summer (DST): UTC+02:00 (CEST)
- INSEE/Postal code: 80683 /80190
- ^{1} French Land Register data, which excludes lakes, ponds, glaciers > 1 km^{2} (0.386 sq mi or 247 acres) and river estuaries.

Rouy-le-Grand (French pronunciation: [ʁwi lə ɡʁɑ̃]) is a commune in the Somme department in Hauts-de-France in northern France.

== Geography ==
The commune is situated 53 kilometres (33 mi) southeast of Amiens, on the C2 road.

== Population ==
Historical population
Year	Pop.	±% p.a.
1968	103	—
1975	71	−5.18%
1982	115	+7.13%
1990	99	−1.86%
1999	103	+0.44%
2007	107	+0.48%
2012	111	+0.74%
2017	107	−0.73%
2023	100	−1.12%
Source: INSEE

== See also ==
- Communes of the Somme department
