= Rouy-le-Petit =

- Commune
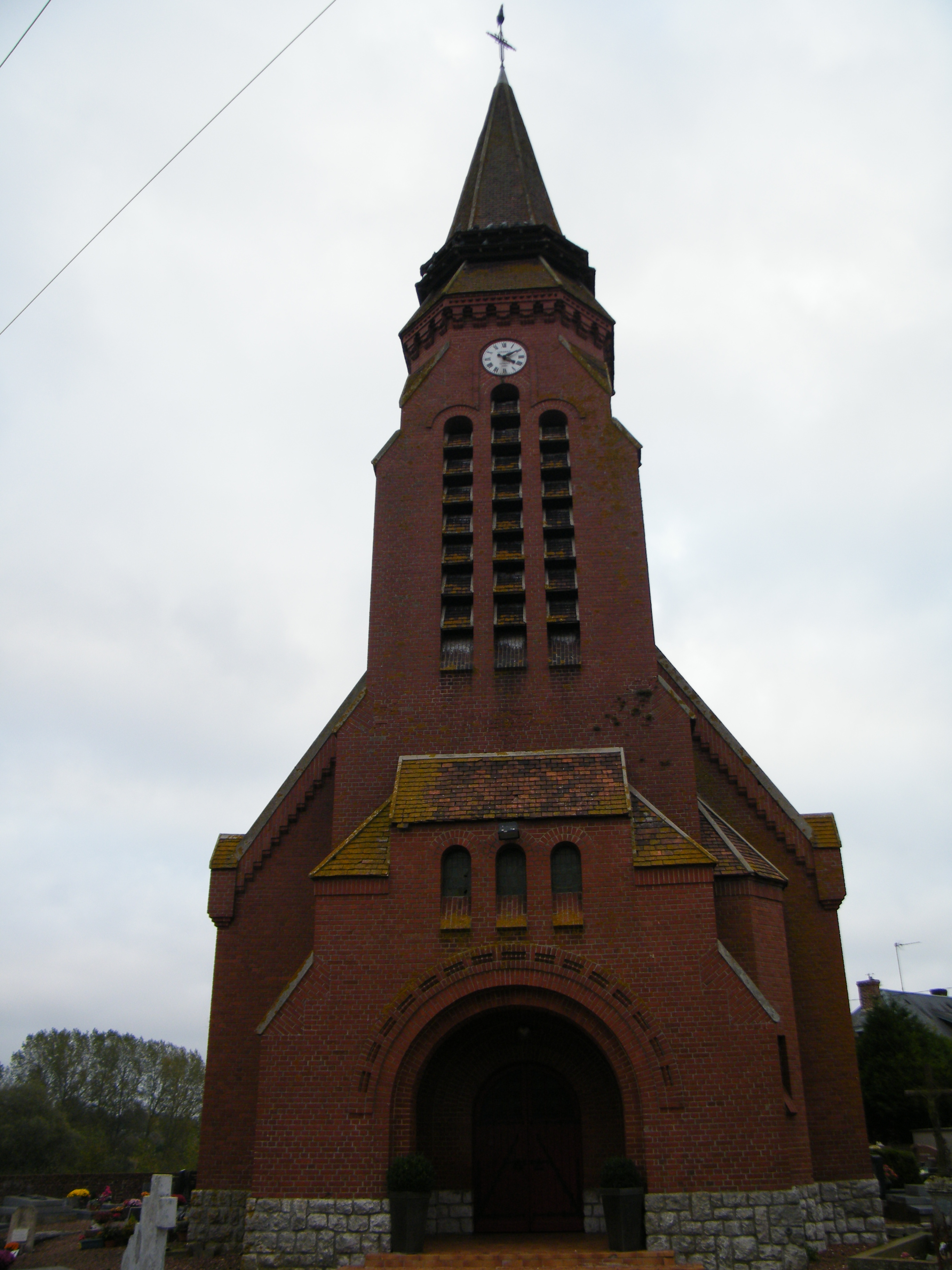
- The church in Rouy-le-Petit
- Location of Rouy-le-Petit
- Location within France Location within Hauts-de-France
- Coordinates: 49°46′34″N 2°57′35″E
- Country: France
- Region: Hauts-de-France
- Department: Somme
- Arrondissement: Péronne
- Canton: Ham
- Intercommunality: CC Est de la Somme

Government
  - Mayor (2020–2026): André Salomé
- Area^{1}: 3.27 km^{2} (1.26 sq mi)
- Elevation: 68 m (223 ft)
- Highest elevation: 77 m (253 ft)
- Lowest elevation: 52 m (171 ft)
- Population (2023): 101
  - Density: 30.9/km^{2} (80.0/sq mi)
- Time zone: UTC+01:00 (CET)
  - Summer (DST): UTC+02:00 (CEST)
- INSEE/Postal code: 80684 /80190
- ^{1} French Land Register data, which excludes lakes, ponds, glaciers > 1 km^{2} (0.386 sq mi or 247 acres) and river estuaries.

Rouy-le-Petit (French pronunciation: [ʁwi lə pəti]) is a commune in the Somme department in Hauts-de-France in northern France.

== Geography ==
The commune is situated some 33 miles (53 km) southeast of Amiens, on the D930c road.

== Population ==
Historical population
| Year | Pop. | ±% p.a. |
|---|---|---|
| 1968 | 117 | — |
| 1975 | 126 | +1.06% |
| 1982 | 107 | −2.31% |
| 1990 | 104 | −0.35% |
| 1999 | 125 | +2.06% |
| 2007 | 127 | +0.20% |
| 2012 | 122 | −0.80% |
| 2017 | 112 | −1.70% |
| 2023 | 101 | −1.71% |
Source: INSEE

== See also ==
- Communes of the Somme department
