= Canton of Chaulnes =

Coordinates: 49°48′59″N 2°48′17″E

Chaulnes
- Former canton
- Interactive map of Chaulnes
- Country: France
- Region: Hauts-de-France
- Department: Somme
- No. of communes: {{{nbcomm}}}
- Disbanded: 2015
- Area: 143.04 km^{2} (55.23 sq mi)
- Population (2012): 7,410
  - Density: 51.8/km^{2} (134/sq mi)

The Canton of Chaulnes is a former canton situated in the department of the Somme and in the Picardie region of northern France. It was disbanded following the French canton reorganisation which came into effect in March 2015. It consisted of 22 communes, which joined the canton of Ham in 2015. It had 7,410 inhabitants (2012).

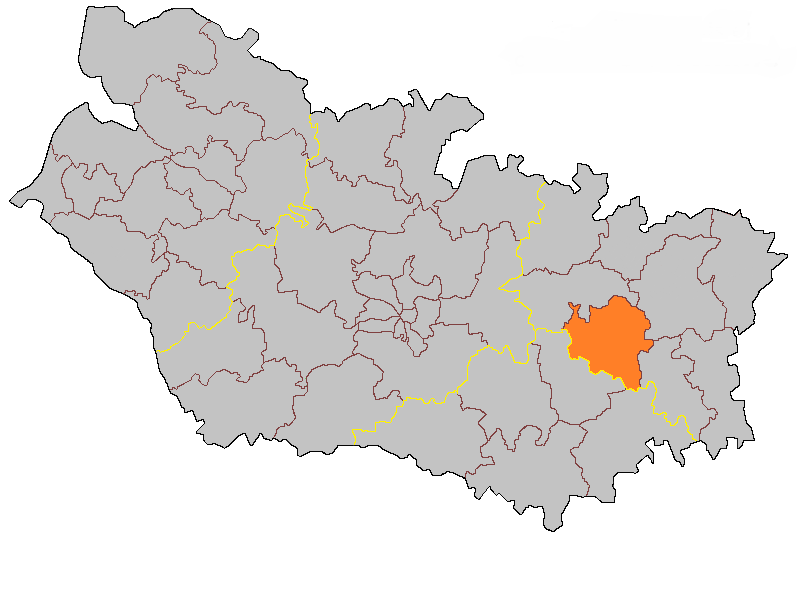
A map showing the location of the former Cantons of france

== Geography ==
The canton is organised around the commune of Chaulnes in the arrondissement of Péronne. The altitude varies from 32 m (Proyart) to 112 m (Lihons) for an average of 87 m.

The canton comprised 22 communes:

- Ablaincourt-Pressoir
- Assevillers
- Belloy-en-Santerre
- Berny-en-Santerre
- Chaulnes
- Chuignes
- Dompierre-Becquincourt
- Estrées-Deniécourt
- Fay
- Fontaine-lès-Cappy
- Foucaucourt-en-Santerre
- Framerville-Rainecourt
- Fresnes-Mazancourt
- Herleville
- Hyencourt-le-Grand
- Lihons
- Omiécourt
- Proyart
- Puzeaux
- Soyécourt
- Vauvillers
- Vermandovillers

== Population ==
Population Growth
1962	1968	1975	1982	1990	1999
5044	6411	6151	6064	6332	6564
Census count starting from 1962 : Population without double counting

== See also ==
- Arrondissements of the Somme department
- Cantons of the Somme department
- Communes of the Somme department
