= Communauté de communes de Haute Picardie =

Coordinates: 49.8747°N 2.8278°E

Haute Picardie
- Former communauté de communes
- Interactive map of Haute Picardie
- Country: France
- Region: Hauts-de-France
- Department: Somme
- No. of communes: {{{nbcomm}}}
- Disbanded: 2017

The Communauté de communes de Haute Picardie is a former communauté de communes in the Somme département and in the Picardie région of France. It was created in June 1994. It was merged into the new Communauté de communes Terre de Picardie in January 2017.

== Composition ==
This Communauté de communes included 26 communes:

1. Ablaincourt-Pressoir
2. Assevillers
3. Belloy-en-Santerre
4. Berny-en-Santerre
5. Chaulnes
6. Chuignes
7. Dompierre-Becquincourt
8. Estrées-Deniécourt
9. Fay
10. Fontaine-lès-Cappy
11. Foucaucourt-en-Santerre
12. Framerville-Rainecourt
13. Fresnes-Mazancourt
14. Herleville
15. Hyencourt-le-Grand
16. Lihons
17. Marchélepot
18. Misery
19. Omiécourt
20. Pertain
21. Proyart
22. Punchy
23. Puzeaux
24. Soyécourt
25. Vauvillers
26. Vermandovillers

== See also ==
- Communes of the Somme department
