= List of aerial victories of Rudolf Berthold =

Rudolf Berthold, with Blue Max. Gloves clasped in right hand disguised paralysis.

Rudolf Berthold (24 March 1891 – 15 March 1920) was a German flying ace of World War I. Between 1916 and 1918, he shot down 44 enemy planes—16 of them while flying one-handed. Berthold's perseverance, bravery, and willingness to return to combat while still wounded made him one of the most famous German pilots of World War I. This article lists his aerial victories during the conflict.

== Aerial victories credited to Rudolf Berthold ==
Unconfirmed victories are denoted by "u/c". Confirmed victories are numbered and listed chronologically. Listings of single casualties are obviously of pilots. In victories over an air crew, pilot casualties are listed first, then the observer(s).

Accuracy of combat claims is always of concern when compiling victory lists. As the primary arena for aerial combat on the Western Front was over the German trenches and rear works, German aerial and ground observers could usually verify German victories in considerable detail.

Doubled horizontal lines in table denote changes in unit assignments.

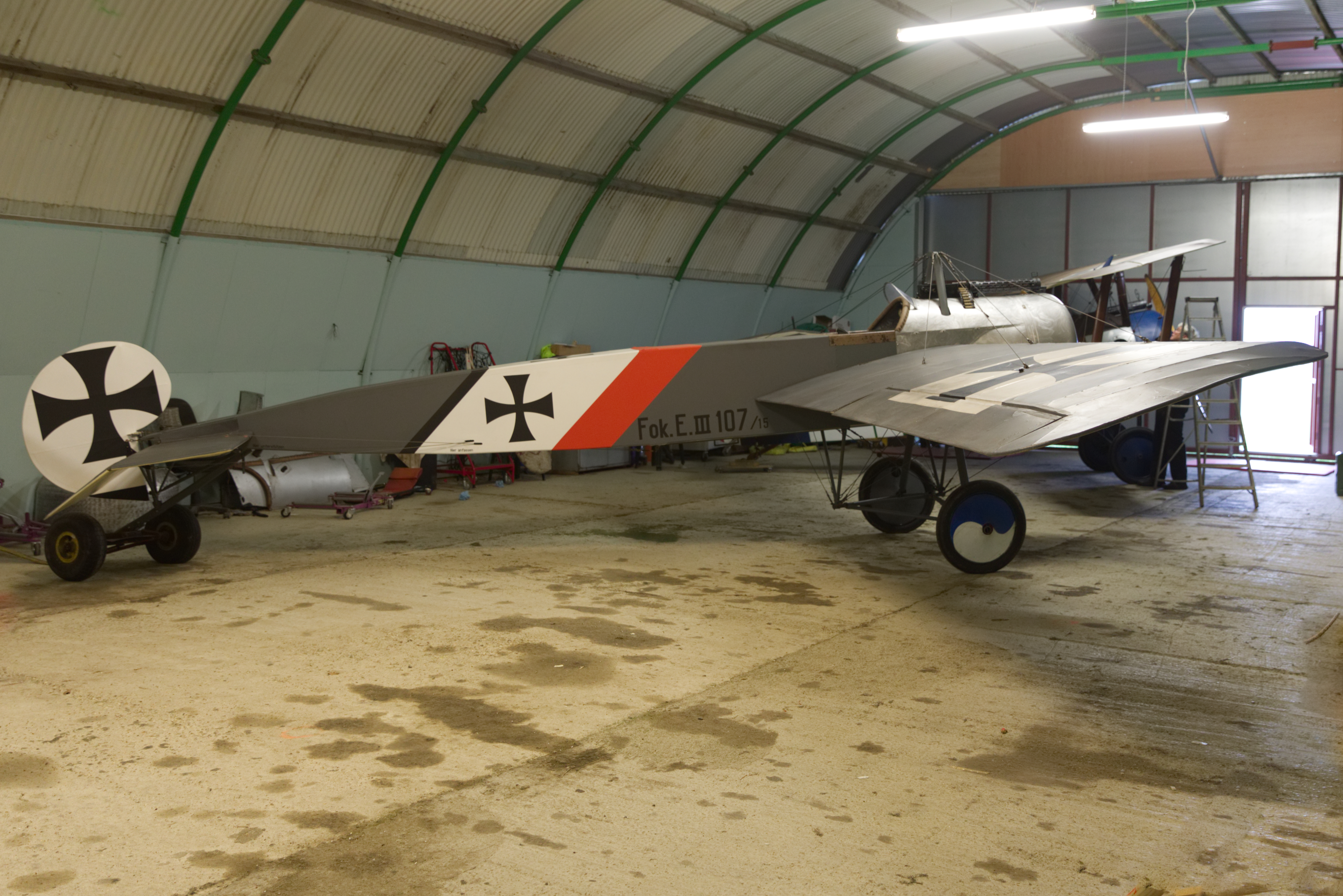
Berthold's original weapon was a Fokker E.III.

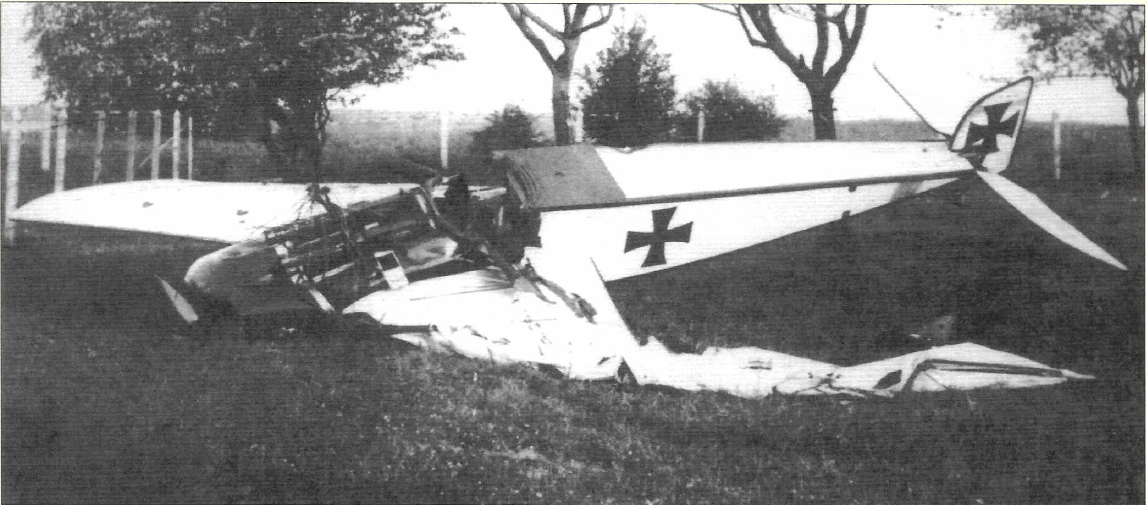
Berthold's Pfalz E.IV 25 April 1916

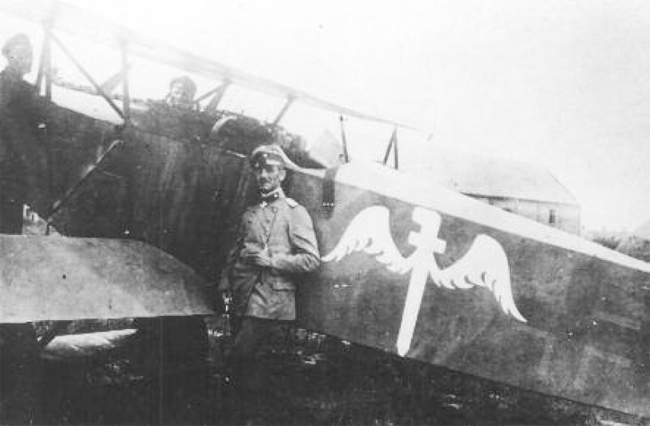
Berthold's beside his Fokker D.VII which would have been painted with scarlet cowling and a royal blue fuselage bearing a winged sword emblem.

No.	Date/time	Aircraft	Foe/Squadron	Result	Location	Notes
1	2 February 1916	Fokker E.III serial number 411/15; Kampfeinsitzer Kommando Vaux, Die Fliegertuppen	Voisin LA; Escadrille VB.108 Aéronautique Militaire	Driven down	Chaulnes, France	Corporal Arthur Jacquin POW, Sous lieutenant Pierre Segaud KIA
2	5 February 1916	Fokker E.III s/n 411/15; Kampfeinsitzer Kommando Vaux, Die Fliegertuppen	Royal Aircraft Factory BE.2c s/n 4091; No. 13 Squadron RFC		Near Irles, France	Second lieutenant Leonard John Pearson POW; Second Lieutenant Edmund Heathfield Elliott Joe Alexander POW, WIA
3	13 March 1916	Fokker E.III s/n 411/15; Kampfeinsitzer Kommando Vaux, Die Fliegertuppen	Royal Aircraft Factory BE.2c serial number 4151; No. 8 Squadron RFC		Near Bourlon, France	2nd Lieutenant Michael Amyss Julian Orde WIA, POW; 1AM P. Shaw POW
4	1 April 1916	Fokker E.III s/n 411/15; Kampfeinsitzer Kommando Vaux, Die Fliegertuppen	Farman F.40; Escadrille MF.54 Aéronautique Militaire	Set afire in midair	Near Lihons, France	Sergeant Louis Paoli KIA; Lieutenant Alfred Braut KIA
5	16 April 1916	Fokker E.III s/n 411/15; Kampfeinsitzer Kommando Vaux, Die Fliegertuppen	Royal Aircraft Factory BE.2c s/n 2097; No. 9 Squadron RFC		South of Maurepas, France	Second Lieutenant Wallace Sinclair Earle KIA; Second Lieutenant Cuthbert William Prideaux Selby WIA/POW
6	24 August 1916	Fokker E.III s/n 411/15; Kampfeinsitzer Kommando Vaux, Die Fliegertuppen	Nieuport 17 s/n 1552; Escadrille N.37 Aéronautique Militaire		Péronne, France	Corporal Henri Dangueuger KIA
7	17 September 1916	Unknown aircraft; Jagdstaffel 4, Die Fliegertuppen	Martinsyde G.100 s/n 7286; No. 27 Squadron RFC		Cambrai, France	Lieutenant William Hugh Stobart Chance POW
u/c	19 September 1916	Unknown aircraft; Jagdstaffel 4, Die Fliegertuppen	Either Royal Aircraft Factory BE.12 s/n 6521 or Royal Aircraft Factory BE.12 s/n 6591; No. 19 Squadron RFC		Bapaume	Either Second Lieutenant Robert Douglas Herman POW/DOW, or Second Lieutenant Reginald Howard Edwards POW/DOW
u/c	22 September 1916	Unknown aircraft; Jagdstaffel 4, Die Fliegertuppen	Royal Aircraft Factory BE.12 s/n 6544; No. 19 Squadron RFC		Bertincourt, France	
u/c	24 September 1916 @ 11:00 hours	Unknown aircraft; Jagdstaffel 4, Die Fliegertuppen	Nieuport 17; Escadrille N.103 Aéronautique Militaire	Midair collision	Rancourt, France	
8	26 September 1916 @ 13:15 hours	Unknown aircraft; Jagdstaffel 4, Die Fliegertuppen	Royal Aircraft Factory BE.2c s/n 7079; No. 9 Squadron RFC		Bertincourt, France	Lieutenant Bernard Tarrant Coller KIA; Second Lieutenant Thomas Earle Gordon Scaife KIA
9	24 March 1917	Albatros D.III s/n D.1717/16; Jagdstaffel 14, Luftstreitkräfte	Farman 40 s/n 4100; Escadrille F.7 Aéronautique Militaire		Aizy-Vailly	Corporal Jean Peinaud KIA; Lieutenant Marcel Vernes KIA
10	6 April 1917 @ 13:15 hours	Albatros D.III s/n D.2182/16; Jagdstaffel 14, Luftstreitkräfte	Caudron R.4 s/n 1559; Escadrille F.35 Aéronautique Militaire		Braye-en-Laonnois	Sous lieutenant Pierre Etienne Frederic Desbordes MIA; Lieutenant Jacques-Victor-Alexandre Borgolta MIA; Soldat Alexandre Joseph Lebleu MIA
11	11 April 1917 @ 11:45 hours	Albatros D.III s/n D.2182/16; Jagdstaffel 14, Luftstreitkräfte	SPAD VII s/n 370; Escadrille Spa.73 Aéronautique Militaire	Shot down	Corbeny, France	Adjutant Albert Barioz MIA
12	14 April 1917 @ 12:00 hours	Albatros D.III s/n D.2182/16; Jagdstaffel 14, Luftstreitkräfte	Sopwith 1 A2; Escadrille N.73 Aéronautique Militaire		Bois de Beau Mavais	Sous lieutenant Antoine Arnoux de Maison-Rouge WIA/DOW; Sous lieutenant Robert Levi WIA
13	21 August 1917 @ 08:17 hours	Albatros D.III; Jagdstaffel 18, Luftstreitkräfte	Airco DH.4 s/n A7577; No. 57 Squadron RFC	Shot down	Diksmuide, Belgium	Lieutenant Cecil Barry KIA; Second Lieutenant Frederick Ewan Baldwin Falkiner KIA
14	4 September 1917 @ 08:25 hours	Albatros D.III; Jagdstaffel 18, Luftstreitkräfte	Royal Aircraft Factory RE.8; No. 7 Squadron RFC		North of Ypres, Belgium	Second Lieutenant Thomas Ernest Wray KIA; Second Lieutenant Wilfred Stuart Lane Payne KIA
15	4 September 1917 @ 17:00 hours	Albatros D.III; Jagdstaffel 18, Luftstreitkräfte	Royal Aircraft Factory RE.8 s/n A4372; No. 9 Squadron RFC	Returned to British lines	St. Jean (north of Ypres), Belgium	Second Lieutenant G. N. Moore WIA; /Lt. F. F. Munro unhurt
16	5 September 1917 @ 15:28 hours	Albatros D.III; Jagdstaffel 18, Luftstreitkräfte	Airco DH.4 s/n A7530; No. 55 Squadron RFC	Shot down	Vicinity of Thielt	Lieutenant John William Fraser Neill WIA/POW; Second Lieutenant Thomas Milligan Webster WIA/POW
17	15 September 1917 @ 14:10 hours	Albatros D.III; Jagdstaffel 18, Luftstreitkräfte	Airco DH.4 s/n A2130; No. 55 Squadron RFC		Zillebeke Lake, Belgium	Lieutenant Eric Edward Foster Loyd POW; Lieutenant Thomas G. Deason POW
18	16 September 1917	Albatros D.III; Jagdstaffel 18, Luftstreitkräfte	Royal Aircraft Factory RE.8; No. 6 Squadron RFC	Shot down	West of Becalaere	2nd Lieutenant Herbert Haslam KIA; Lance Corporal Alfred John Linay KIA
19	16 September 1917 @ 1825 hours	Albatros D.III; Jagdstaffel 18, Luftstreitkräfte	Royal Aircraft Factory RE.8 s/n A.4728; No. 4 Squadron RFC	Shot down	Zonnebeke, Belgium	2nd Lieutenant Leslie Glendower Humphries KIA; 2nd Lieutenant Frederick Laurie Steben WIA
20	19 September 1917 @ 10:00 hours	Albatros D.III; Jagdstaffel 18, Luftstreitkräfte	Royal Aircraft Factory RE.8 s/n B.3427; No. 4 Squadron RFC		Becelaere	2nd Lieutenant John Syers Walthew KIA; Lieutenant Michael Charles Hartnett KIA
21	20 September 1917 @ 11:30 hours	Albatros D.III; Jagdstaffel 18, Luftstreitkräfte	Airco DH.5 s/n A.9179; No. 32 Squadron RFC		West of Menen, Belgium	2nd Lieutenant William Oliver Cornish KIA
22	21 September 1917 @ 09:50 hours	Albatros D.III; Jagdstaffel 18, Luftstreitkräfte	Spad VII s/n B.3533; No. 19 Squadron RFC		West of Menen, Belgium	2nd Lieutenant Frederick William Kirby KIA
23	22 September 1917 @ 09:00 hours	Albatros D.III; Jagdstaffel 18, Luftstreitkräfte	Bristol F.2b Fighter s/n A7205; No. 22 Squadron RFC		Zillebeke Lake, Belgium	2nd Lieutenant Elvis Albert Bell KIA; 2nd Lieutenant Robert Emmett Nowell KIA
24	25 September 1917 @ 1630 hours	Albatros D.III; Jagdstaffel 18, Luftstreitkräfte	Spad VII s/n B3520; No. 19 Squadron RFC	Shot down	Gheluvelt	Lieutenant Bernard Alexander Powers KIA
25	26 September 1917 @ 12:00 hours	Albatros D.III; Jagdstaffel 18, Luftstreitkräfte	Sopwith Camel s/n B2358; No. 70 Squadron RFC		Becelaere	Lieutenant Walter Harvey Russell Gould KIA
26	28 September 1917 @ 12:30 hours	Albatros D.III; Jagdstaffel 18, Luftstreitkräfte	Airco DH.5; No. 32 Squadron RFC		South of Zillebeke Lake, Belgium	Captain Alwayne Travers Loyd KIA
27	30 September 1917 @ 11:50 hours	Albatros D.III; Jagdstaffel 18, Luftstreitkräfte	Either Sopwith Pup s/n B.2185 or B.1768; No. 66 Squadron RFC		Deûlémont, France	
28	2 October 1917 @ 13:30 hours	Albatros D.III; Jagdstaffel 18, Luftstreitkräfte	Airco DH.4 s/n A.7581; No. 57 Squadron RFC		Roeselare, Belgium	2nd Lieutenant Colin Geen Orr Mac Andrew KIA; 2nd Lieutenant Leicester Philip Sidney KIA
29	28 May 1918 @ 11:30 hours	Fokker D.VII; Jagdstaffel 15, Luftstreitkräfte	Nieuport 27; Escadrille Sop.278 Aéronautique Militaire		Crouy, northeast of Soissons	
30	29 May 1918 @ 1830 hours	Fokker D.VII; Jagdstaffel 15, Luftstreitkräfte	Spad XIII; Escadrille Spa.77 Aéronautique Militaire		South of Soissons	Sergente Andre Louis Maurice Gehin MIA
31	29 May 1918 @ 18:40 hours	Fokker D.VII; Jagdstaffel 15, Luftstreitkräfte	Salmson 2A2; Escadrille Sal.27 Aéronautique Militaire			Maréchal des logis Tussing MIA; Lieutenant Camille Lemmery WIA/POW
32	5 June 1918	Fokker D.VII; Jagdstaffel 15, Luftstreitkräfte	Airco DH.9 s/n C.6203; No. 103 Squadron RAF	Shot down	North of Saint-Just-en-Chaussée, France	Captain Henry Turner KIA; 2nd Lieutenant George Webb KIA
33	11 June 1918	Fokker D.VII; Jagdstaffel 15, Luftstreitkräfte	French two-seater aircraft; Aéronautique Militaire	Shot down		
34	12 June 1918	Fokker D.VII; Jagdstaffel 15, Luftstreitkräfte	Spad XIII; Escadrille Spa.96 Aéronautique Militaire			Corporal Jacques Monod DOW
35	18 June 1918 @ 11:50 hours	Fokker D.VII; Jagdstaffel 15, Luftstreitkräfte	Royal Aircraft Factory SE.5a s/n C1923; No. 84 Squadron RAF		Villers-Bretonneux	Lieutenant Peter Nielsen KIA
36	18 June 1918 @ 11:55 hours	Fokker D.VII; Jagdstaffel 15, Luftstreitkräfte	Royal Aircraft Factory SE.5a s/n D259; No. 84 Squadron RAF		Villers Bretonneux	2nd Lieutenant Robert Joss Fyfe KIA
37	27 June 1918 @ 19:06 hours	Fokker D.VII; Jagdstaffel 15, Luftstreitkräfte	Bristol F.2b Fighter s/n C.935; No. 48 Squadron RAF	Shot down in flames	Villers Bretonneux	Lieutenant Edward Alec Foord KIA; Sergeant Leonard James KIA
38	19 July 1918	Fokker D.VII; Jagdstaffel 15, Luftstreitkräfte	Salmson 2A2; Escadrille Sal.40 Aéronautique Militaire	Observer landed aircraft	Vicinity of Soissons	Captain Henri Denis KIA; Lieutenant Chappius unhurt
39	20 July 1918 @ 19:05 hours	Fokker D.VII; Jagdstaffel 15, Luftstreitkräfte	Two-seater; Aéronautique Militaire		Southeast of Dormans, France	
40	1 August 1918 @ 09:45 hours	Fokker D.VII; Jagdstaffel 15, Luftstreitkräfte	Salmson 2A2; 1st Aero Squadron USAAS		Fere-en-Tardenois, France	1st Lieutenant William P. Erwin unhurt; 1st Lieutenant Earl B. Spencer WIA
41	9 August 1918 @ 18:00 hours	Fokker D.VII; Jagdstaffel 15, Luftstreitkräfte	Spad 16 two-seater; Escadrille Spa.289 Aéronautique Militaire	Crashed	Tricot, France	Aircrew KIA
42	9 August 1918 @ 18:30 hours	Fokker D.VII; Jagdstaffel 15, Luftstreitkräfte	Spad 16 two-seater; Escadrille Spa.289 Aéronautique Militaire		Beaucourt-en-Santerre, France	Aircrew KIA
43	10 August 1918 @ 12:20 hours	Fokker D.VII; Jagdstaffel 15, Luftstreitkräfte	Royal Aircraft Factory SE.5a; No. 32 Squadron RAF	Set afire in midair	Licourt, France	Lieutenant Peter Macfarlane KIA
44	10 August 1918 @ 12:30 hours	Fokker D.VII; Jagdstaffel 15, Luftstreitkräfte	Airco DH.9 s/n B.9344; No. 49 Squadron RAF	Crashed in a cloud of dust	Ablaincourt, France	2nd Lieutenant H. Hartley POW; Sergeant O. D. Beetham POW

Sources: Basic information compiled from victory lists in Franks et al. 1993, pp. 71–72 and Kilduff 2012, pp. 138–140. Added references for air crew members' names in Notes column are from the narrative text of Kilduff. Citations for individual victories are also given above. List is complete.
