= Punchy =

Punchy may refer to:

- Punchy, Hawaiian Punch's mascot
- Dementia pugilistica, a neurological disorder which affects some boxers, also called punch-drunk syndrome
- Punchy, Somme, a French commune
- Punchy, a nickname for the town of Punchbowl, New South Wales, Australia
- Punchy, a video game based on Punch and Judy
- "Punchy", an episode of TV series Adventure Time: Side Quests
