= Curchy-Dreslincourt station =

Railway station in Curchy, France

Curchy-Dreslincourt

General information
- Location: Curchy
- Coordinates: 49°46′54″N 2°51′54″E
- Owner: RFF/SNCF
- Line: Amiens–Laon railway
- Platforms: 2
- Tracks: 3

History
- Opened: 1 June 1867
- Closed: December 2007
Location

Curchy-Dreslincourt is a former railway station located in the commune of Curchy in the Somme department, northern France. The station is located on the line from Amiens to Reims, between the stations of Chaulnes and Nesle. The station was closed in December 2007, and replaced by a taxi service to the station of Nesle.

== See also ==
- List of SNCF stations in Hauts-de-France
