= Curchy =

- Commune
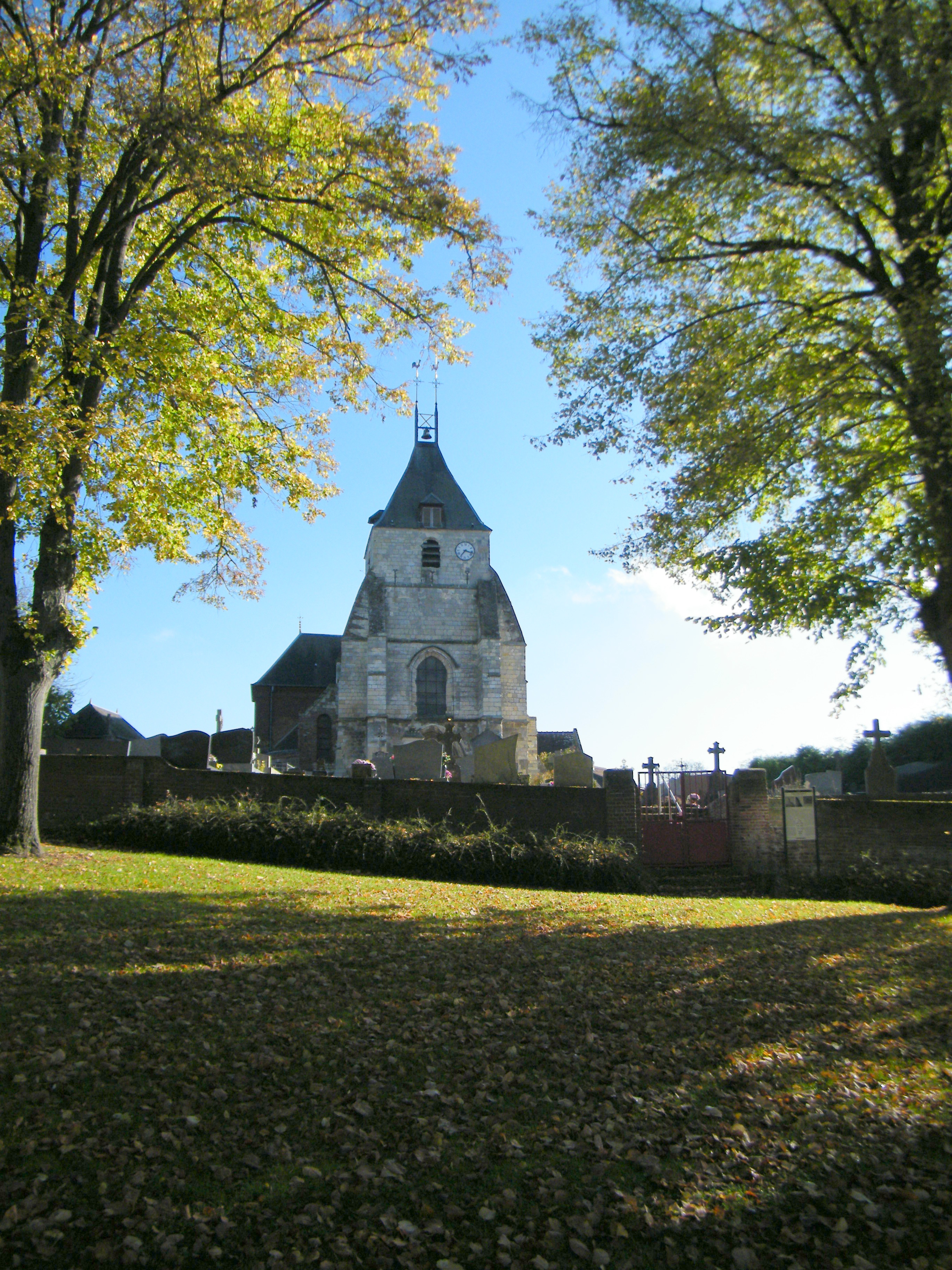
- The church in Curchy
- Location of Curchy
- Location within France Location within Hauts-de-France
- Coordinates: 49°46′38″N 2°51′36″E
- Country: France
- Region: Hauts-de-France
- Department: Somme
- Arrondissement: Péronne
- Canton: Ham
- Intercommunality: CC Est de la Somme

Government
  - Mayor (2021–2026): Jean-Édouard Richard
- Area^{1}: 9.63 km^{2} (3.72 sq mi)
- Elevation: 85 m (279 ft)
- Highest elevation: 88 m (289 ft)
- Lowest elevation: 62 m (203 ft)
- Population (2023): 281
  - Density: 29.2/km^{2} (75.6/sq mi)
- Time zone: UTC+01:00 (CET)
  - Summer (DST): UTC+02:00 (CEST)
- INSEE/Postal code: 80230 /80190
- ^{1} French Land Register data, which excludes lakes, ponds, glaciers > 1 km^{2} (0.386 sq mi or 247 acres) and river estuaries.

Curchy (French pronunciation: [kyʁʃi]) is a commune in the Somme department in Hauts-de-France in northern France.

== Geography ==
Curchy is situated on the D337 road, some 20 miles (32 km) southwest of Saint-Quentin.

== Population ==
Historical population
Year	Pop.	±% p.a.
1968	358	—
1975	314	−1.86%
1982	300	−0.65%
1990	302	+0.08%
1999	297	−0.19%
2007	321	+0.98%
2012	308	−0.82%
2017	298	−0.66%
2023	281	−0.97%
Source: INSEE

== Transport ==
- Curchy-Dreslincourt station

== See also ==
- Communes of the Somme department
