= Communauté de communes Terre de Picardie =

Federation of municipalities in France

Terre de Picardie
- Communauté de communes
- Interactive map of Terre de Picardie
- Coordinates: 49°52′N 02°49′E
- Country: France
- Region: Hauts-de-France
- Department: Somme
- No. of communes: {{{nbcomm}}}
- Established: 2017
- Area: 295.7 km^{2} (114.2 sq mi)
- Population (2019): 18,233
  - Density: 61.66/km^{2} (159.7/sq mi)

The Communauté de communes Terre de Picardie is a communauté de communes in the Somme département and in the Hauts-de-France région of France. It was formed on 1 January 2017 by the merger of the former Communauté de communes de Haute Picardie and the Communauté de communes du Santerre. It consists of 43 communes, and its seat is in Estrées-Deniécourt. Its area is 295.7 km^{2}, and its population was 18,233 in 2019.

== Composition ==
The communauté de communes consists of the following 43 communes:

1. Ablaincourt-Pressoir
2. Assevillers
3. Bayonvillers
4. Beaufort-en-Santerre
5. Belloy-en-Santerre
6. Berny-en-Santerre
7. Bouchoir
8. Caix
9. Chaulnes
10. La Chavatte
11. Chilly
12. Chuignes
13. Dompierre-Becquincourt
14. Estrées-Deniécourt
15. Fay
16. Folies
17. Fontaine-lès-Cappy
18. Foucaucourt-en-Santerre
19. Fouquescourt
20. Framerville-Rainecourt
21. Fransart
22. Fresnes-Mazancourt
23. Guillaucourt
24. Hallu
25. Harbonnières
26. Herleville
27. Hypercourt
28. Lihons
29. Marchélepot-Misery
30. Maucourt
31. Méharicourt
32. Parvillers-le-Quesnoy
33. Proyart
34. Punchy
35. Puzeaux
36. Rosières-en-Santerre
37. Rouvroy-en-Santerre
38. Soyécourt
39. Vauvillers
40. Vermandovillers
41. Vrély
42. Warvillers
43. Wiencourt-l'Équipée
