= Saint-Christ-Briost =

- Commune
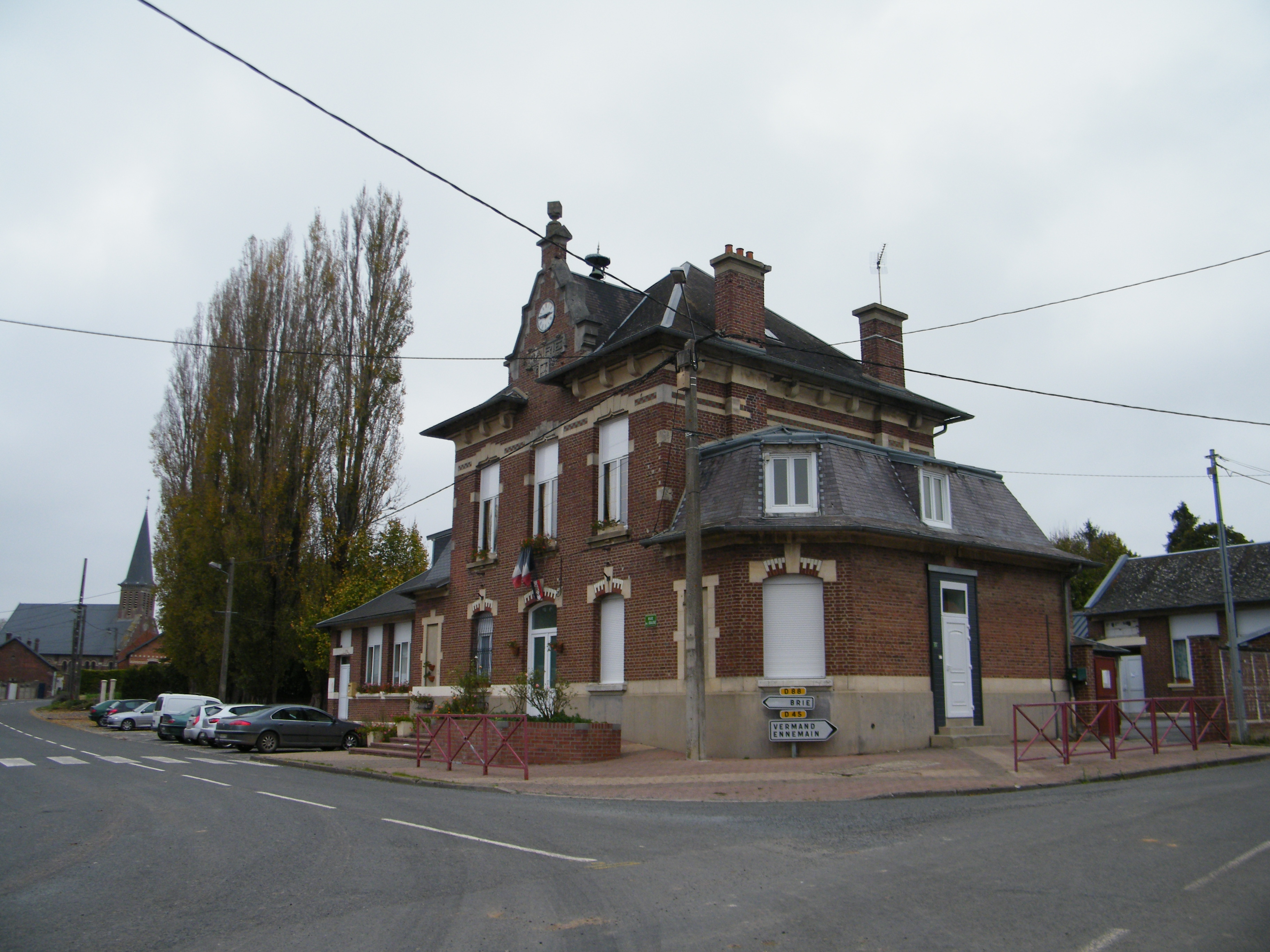
- The town hall and school in Saint-Christ-Briost
- Location of Saint-Christ-Briost
- Location within France Location within Hauts-de-France
- Coordinates: 49°51′16″N 2°55′50″E
- Country: France
- Region: Hauts-de-France
- Department: Somme
- Arrondissement: Péronne
- Canton: Ham
- Intercommunality: CC Est de la Somme

Government
  - Mayor (2020–2026): Joël Bellard
- Area^{1}: 7.82 km^{2} (3.02 sq mi)
- Elevation: 50 m (160 ft)
- Highest elevation: 87 m (285 ft)
- Lowest elevation: 47 m (154 ft)
- Population (2023): 425
  - Density: 54.3/km^{2} (141/sq mi)
- Time zone: UTC+01:00 (CET)
  - Summer (DST): UTC+02:00 (CEST)
- INSEE/Postal code: 80701 /80200
- ^{1} French Land Register data, which excludes lakes, ponds, glaciers > 1 km^{2} (0.386 sq mi or 247 acres) and river estuaries.

Saint-Christ-Briost is a commune in the Somme department in Hauts-de-France in northern France.

== Geography ==
The commune is situated 30 miles (48 km) east of Amiens, on the D45 and D88 roads and by the banks of the river Somme.

== Population ==
Historical population
Year	Pop.	±% p.a.
1968	337	—
1975	341	+0.17%
1982	360	+0.78%
1990	404	+1.45%
1999	408	+0.11%
2007	440	+0.95%
2012	463	+1.02%
2017	437	−1.15%
2023	425	−0.46%
Source: INSEE

== See also ==
- Communes of the Somme department
