= Estrées-Deniécourt =

- Commune
- Location of Estrées-Deniécourt
- Location within France Location within Hauts-de-France
- Coordinates: 49°52′32″N 2°49′28″E
- Country: France
- Region: Hauts-de-France
- Department: Somme
- Arrondissement: Péronne
- Canton: Ham
- Intercommunality: CC Terre de Picardie

Government
  - Mayor (2020–2026): Gérard Guillemont
- Area^{1}: 6.45 km^{2} (2.49 sq mi)
- Elevation: 75 m (246 ft)
- Highest elevation: 85 m (279 ft)
- Lowest elevation: 69 m (226 ft)
- Population (2023): 379
  - Density: 58.8/km^{2} (152/sq mi)
- Time zone: UTC+01:00 (CET)
  - Summer (DST): UTC+02:00 (CEST)
- INSEE/Postal code: 80288 /80200
- ^{1} French Land Register data, which excludes lakes, ponds, glaciers > 1 km^{2} (0.386 sq mi or 247 acres) and river estuaries.

Estrées-Deniécourt (Picard: Étrée-Dgnincourt) is a commune in the Somme department in Hauts-de-France in northern France.

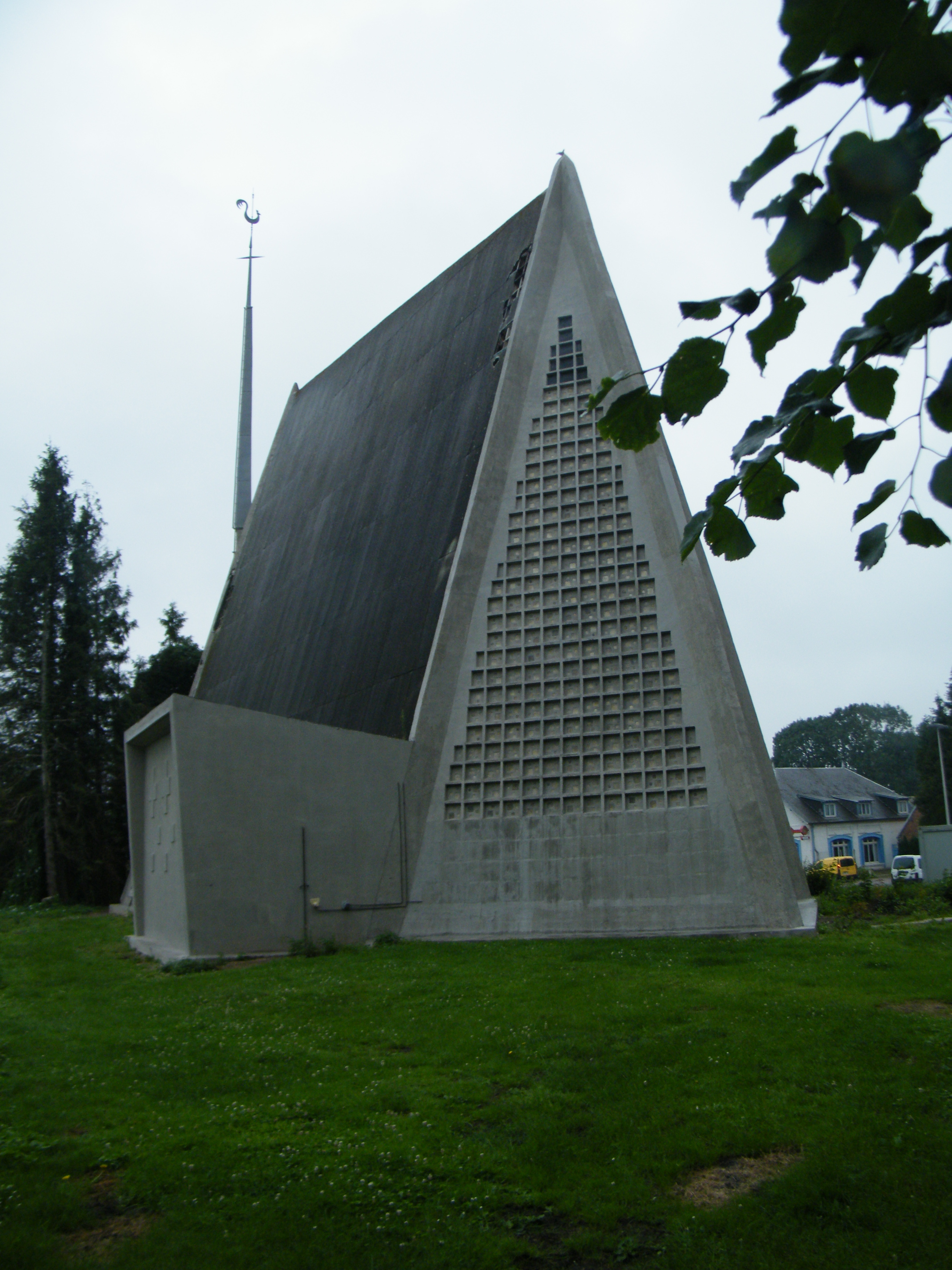
Estrées-Deniécourt

== Geography ==
The commune lies on the national highway N29, at the junction with the A1 autoroute, west of the river Somme and 28 miles (45 km) east of Amiens. It has the remains of a Roman road, the Chaussée Brunehaut passing through the village.

== History ==
It is one of many villages in the north of France bearing the name Estrées. The etymology of the name is from strata (cognate of English "street"), the word for the stone-layered Roman roads in the area (some of which turned into modern highways). Hence Estreti, village on the road which developed into Estrées.

It was the scene of heavy fighting during the Battle of the Somme. The probable (unmarked) burial site of Raynal Bolling, the first U.S. officer of high rank to fall in combat.

The Estrées-Deniécourt Military Cemetery, is located at the west end of the village and the German Cemetery is located on the way to the commune of Fay.

== Population ==
Historical population
Year	Pop.	±% p.a.
1968	255	—
1975	285	+1.60%
1982	253	−1.69%
1990	252	−0.05%
1999	245	−0.31%
2007	273	+1.36%
2012	341	+4.55%
2017	330	−0.65%
2023	379	+2.33%
Source: INSEE

== Miscellaneous ==
The commune holds an annual brocante (flea-market) each June.

== See also ==
- Communes of the Somme department
