= Licourt =

- Commune
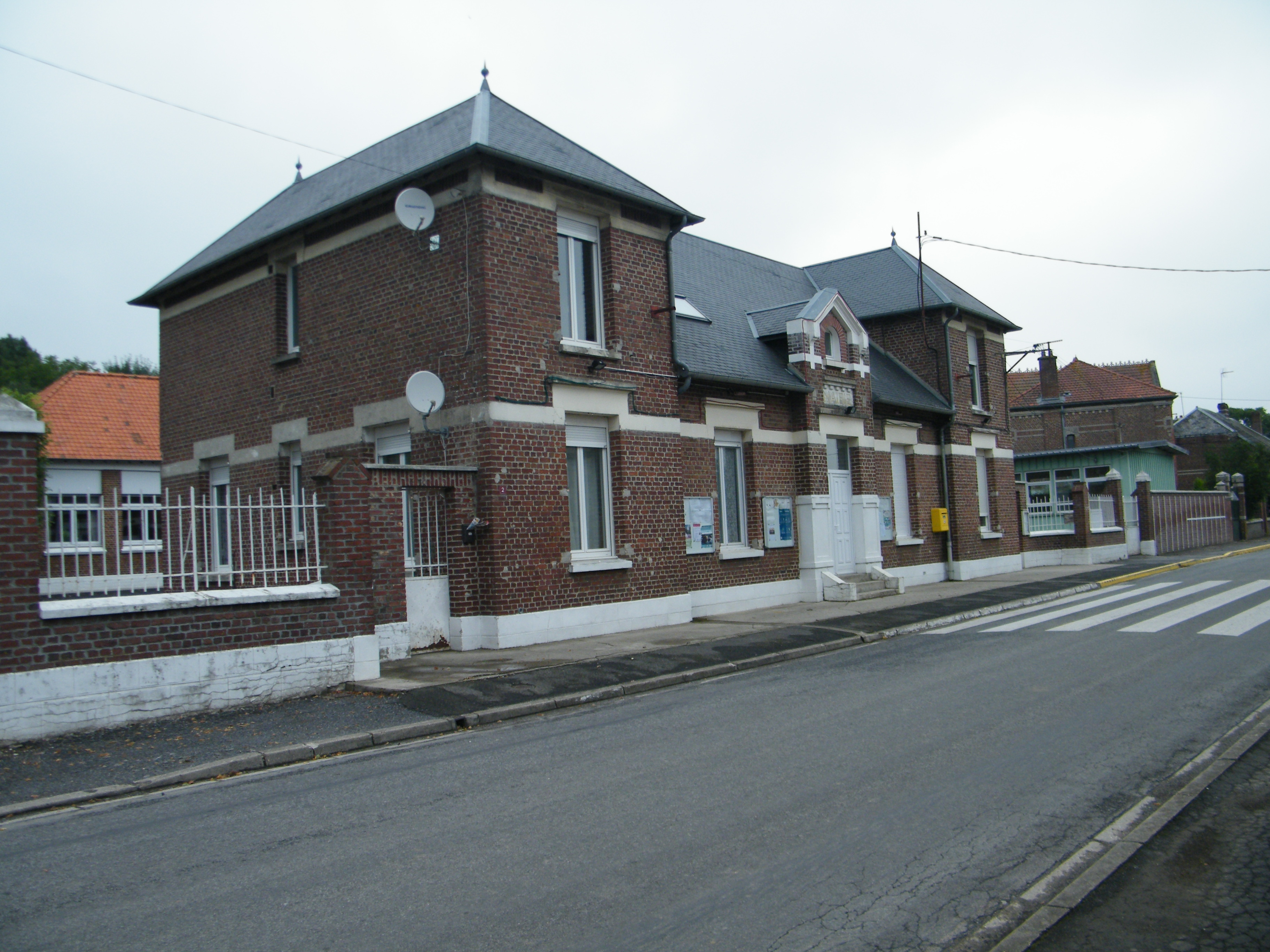
- The town hall and school in Licourt

- Coat of arms
- Location of Licourt
- Location within France Location within Hauts-de-France
- Coordinates: 49°49′32″N 2°53′43″E
- Country: France
- Region: Hauts-de-France
- Department: Somme
- Arrondissement: Péronne
- Canton: Ham
- Intercommunality: CC Est de la Somme

Government
  - Mayor (2024–2026): Laurent Degenne
- Area^{1}: 6.93 km^{2} (2.68 sq mi)
- Elevation: 97 m (318 ft)
- Highest elevation: 104 m (341 ft)
- Lowest elevation: 53 m (174 ft)
- Population (2023): 395
  - Density: 57.0/km^{2} (148/sq mi)
- Time zone: UTC+01:00 (CET)
  - Summer (DST): UTC+02:00 (CEST)
- INSEE/Postal code: 80474 /80320
- ^{1} French Land Register data, which excludes lakes, ponds, glaciers > 1 km^{2} (0.386 sq mi or 247 acres) and river estuaries.

Licourt (French pronunciation: [likuʁ]) is a commune in the Somme department in Hauts-de-France in northern France.

== Geography ==
Licourt is situated on the D35 road, a mile from the A29 autoroute, some 30 miles (48 km) east of Amiens.

== Population ==
Historical population
| Year | Pop. | ±% p.a. |
|---|---|---|
| 1968 | 422 | — |
| 1975 | 424 | +0.07% |
| 1982 | 440 | +0.53% |
| 1990 | 401 | −1.15% |
| 1999 | 390 | −0.31% |
| 2007 | 402 | +0.38% |
| 2012 | 391 | −0.55% |
| 2017 | 400 | +0.46% |
| 2023 | 395 | −0.21% |
Source: INSEE

== See also ==
- Communes of the Somme department
