= Canton of Ham =

Coordinates: 49°44′50″N 3°4′25″E

Ham
- Canton
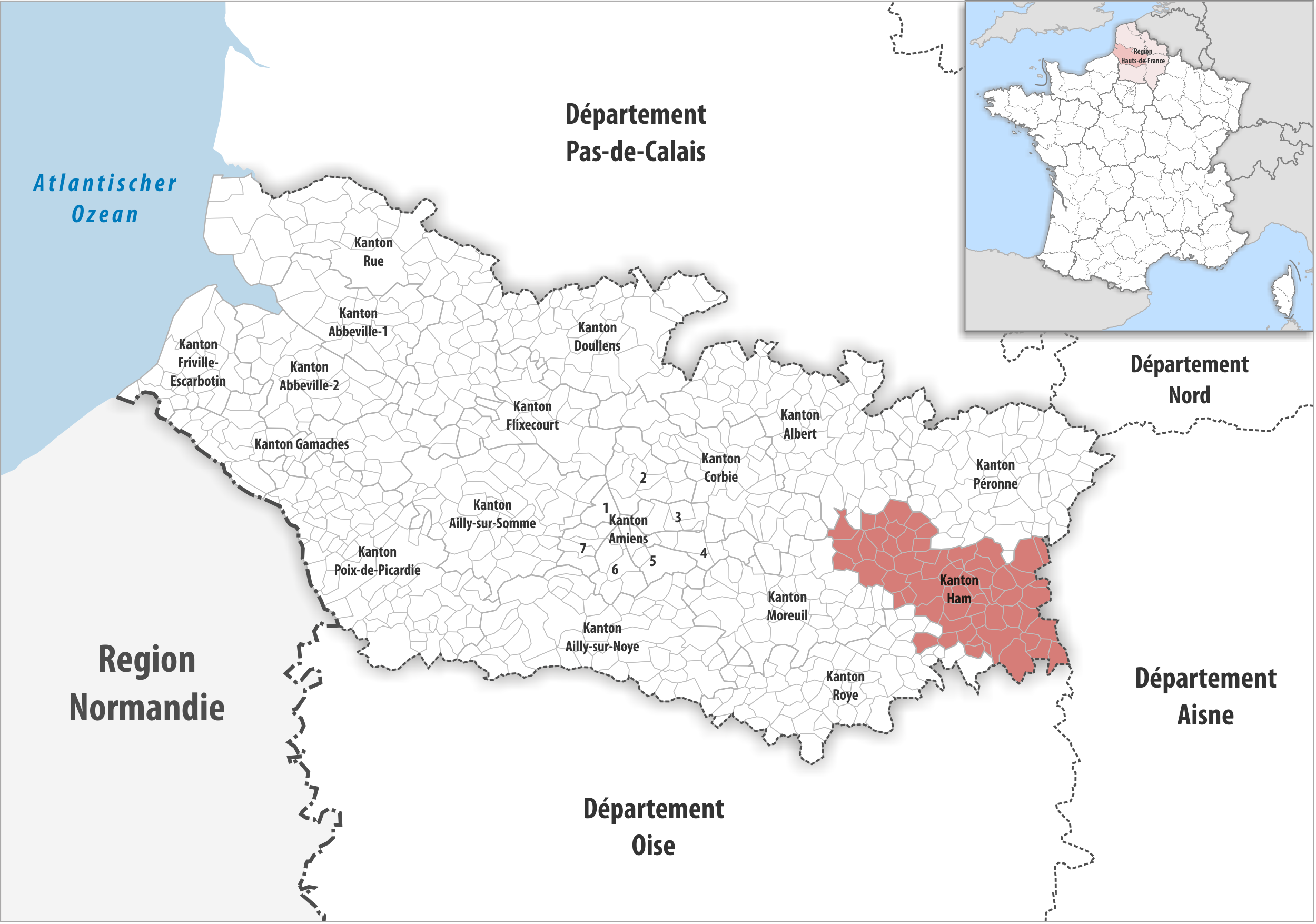
- Location of the canton in Somme
- Country: France
- Region: Hauts-de-France
- Department: Somme
- No. of communes: {{{nbcomm}}}
- Area: 424.63 km^{2} (163.95 sq mi)
- Population (2023): 28,220
  - Density: 66.46/km^{2} (172.1/sq mi)
- INSEE code: 80 18

The Canton of Ham is a canton situated in the department of the Somme and in the Hauts-de-France region of northern France.

== Geography ==
The canton is organised around the commune of Ham.

== Composition ==
At the French canton reorganisation which came into effect in March 2015, the canton was expanded from 19 to 67 communes (7 of which were merged into the new communes Hypercourt, Hombleux and Marchélepot-Misery):

- Ablaincourt-Pressoir
- Assevillers
- Athies
- Belloy-en-Santerre
- Berny-en-Santerre
- Béthencourt-sur-Somme
- Billancourt
- Breuil
- Brouchy
- Buverchy
- Chaulnes
- Chuignes
- Cizancourt
- Croix-Moligneaux
- Curchy
- Dompierre-Becquincourt
- Douilly
- Ennemain
- Épénancourt
- Eppeville
- Esmery-Hallon
- Estrées-Deniécourt
- Falvy
- Fay
- Fontaine-lès-Cappy
- Foucaucourt-en-Santerre
- Framerville-Rainecourt
- Fresnes-Mazancourt
- Ham
- Herleville
- Hombleux
- Hypercourt
- Languevoisin-Quiquery
- Licourt
- Lihons
- Marchélepot-Misery
- Matigny
- Mesnil-Saint-Nicaise
- Monchy-Lagache
- Morchain
- Moyencourt
- Muille-Villette
- Nesle
- Offoy
- Pargny
- Potte
- Proyart
- Punchy
- Puzeaux
- Quivières
- Rethonvillers
- Rouy-le-Grand
- Rouy-le-Petit
- Saint-Christ-Briost
- Sancourt
- Soyécourt
- Tertry
- Ugny-l'Équipée
- Vauvillers
- Vermandovillers
- Villecourt
- Voyennes
- Y

== Population ==
Historical population
Year	Pop.	±% p.a.
2013	29,156	—
2018	28,945	−0.15%
Source: INSEE

== See also ==
- Arrondissements of the Somme department
- Cantons of the Somme department
- Communes of the Somme department
