= Punchy, Somme =

Punchy
- Commune
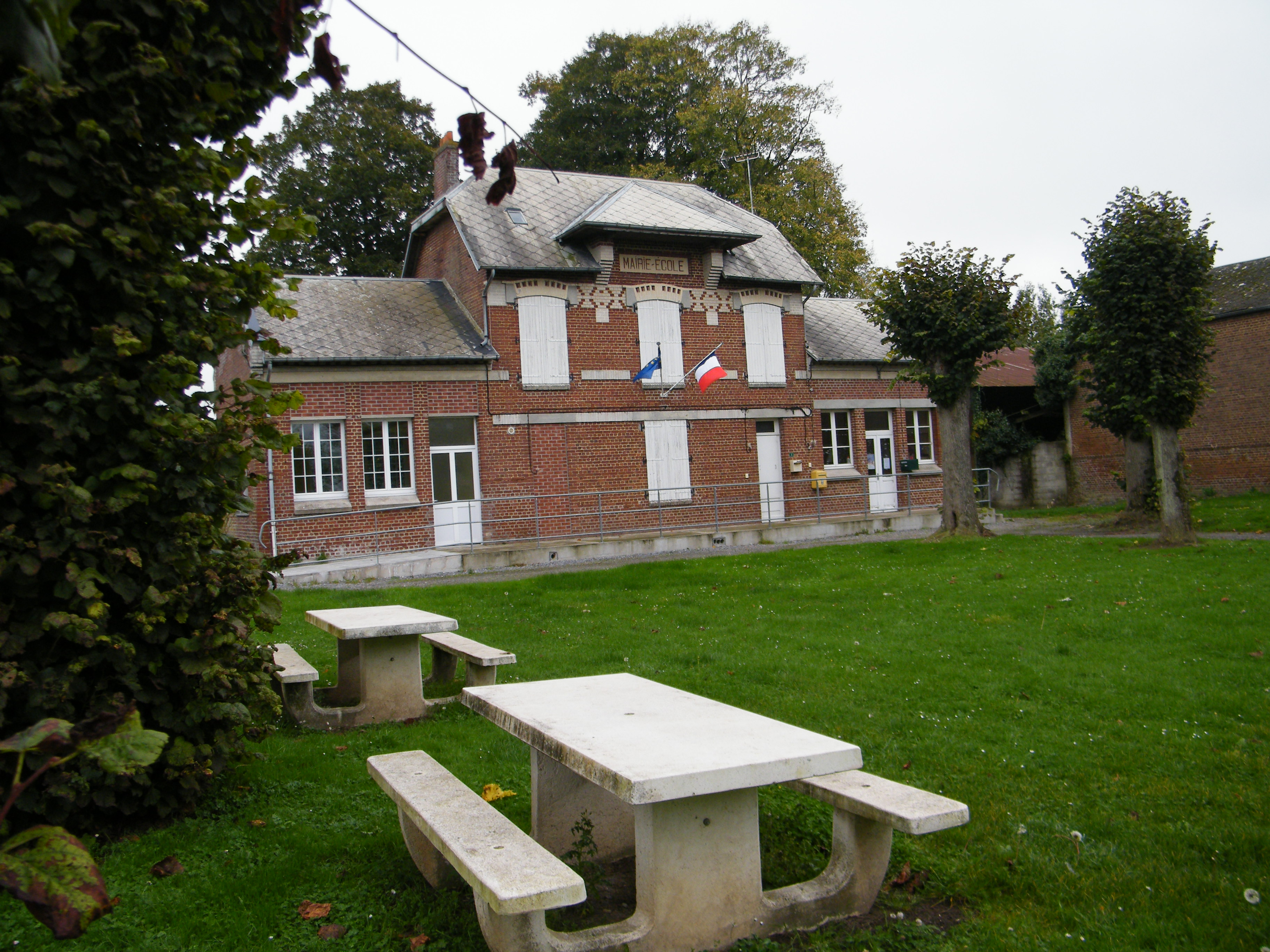
- The town hall and school in Punchy
- Location of Punchy
- Location within France Location within Hauts-de-France
- Coordinates: 49°47′34″N 2°48′39″E
- Country: France
- Region: Hauts-de-France
- Department: Somme
- Arrondissement: Péronne
- Canton: Ham
- Intercommunality: CC Terre de Picardie

Government
  - Mayor (2020–2026): Didier Messio
- Area^{1}: 3.04 km^{2} (1.17 sq mi)
- Elevation: 75 m (246 ft)
- Highest elevation: 88 m (289 ft)
- Lowest elevation: 72 m (236 ft)
- Population (2023): 79
  - Density: 26/km^{2} (67/sq mi)
- Time zone: UTC+01:00 (CET)
  - Summer (DST): UTC+02:00 (CEST)
- INSEE/Postal code: 80646 /80320
- ^{1} French Land Register data, which excludes lakes, ponds, glaciers > 1 km^{2} (0.386 sq mi or 247 acres) and river estuaries.

Punchy (French pronunciation: [pœ̃ʃi]) is a commune in the Somme department in Hauts-de-France in northern France.

== Geography ==
Punchy is situated on the D39 road, some 25 miles (40 km) southeast of Amiens, very close to the A1 autoroute.

== Population ==
Historical population
Year	Pop.	±% p.a.
1968	78	—
1975	79	+0.18%
1982	98	+3.13%
1990	78	−2.81%
1999	65	−2.01%
2007	69	+0.75%
2012	79	+2.74%
2017	87	+1.95%
2023	79	−1.59%
Source: INSEE

== See also ==
- Communes of the Somme department
