= Vauvillers, Somme =

Vauvillers
- Commune
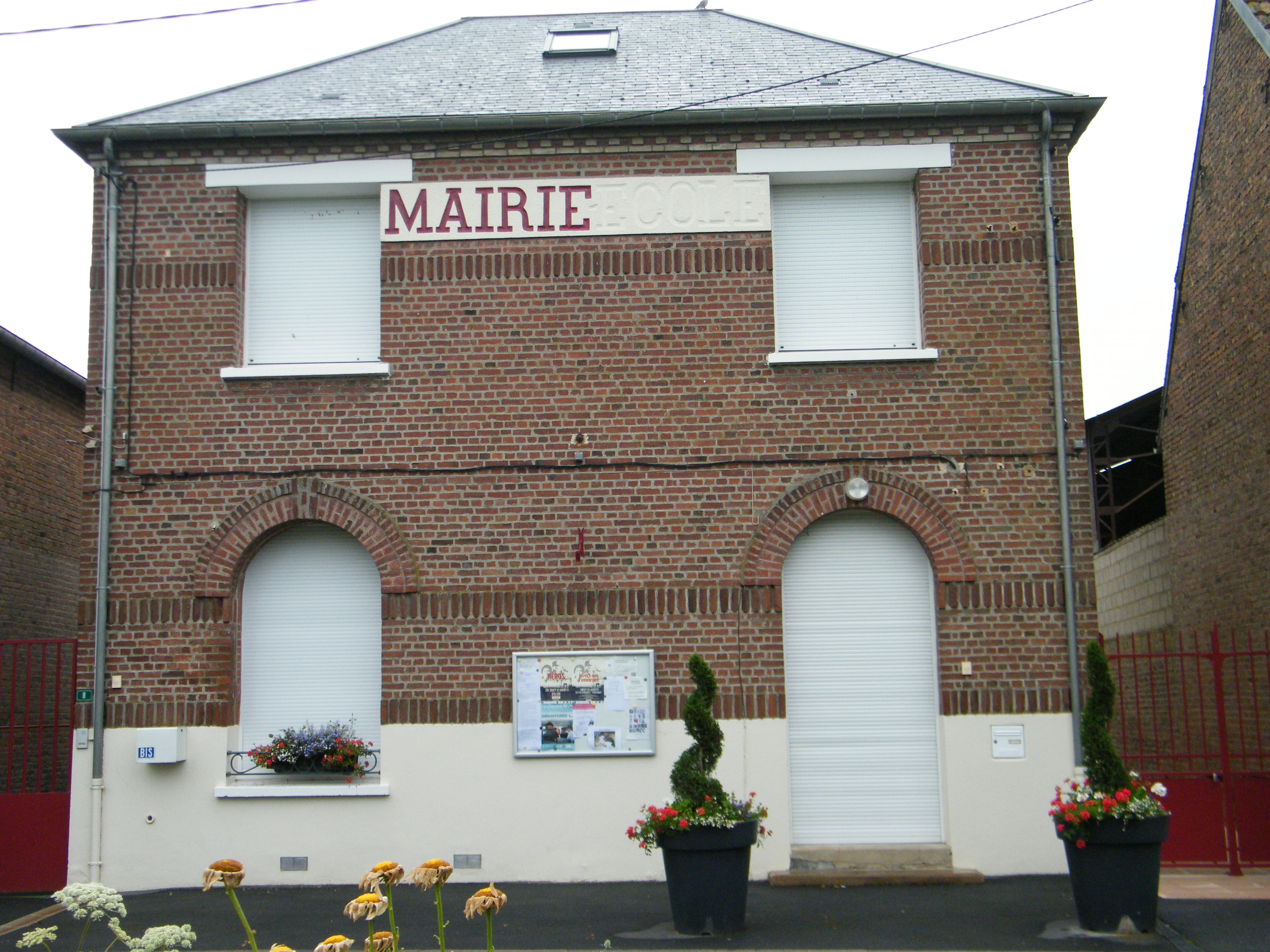
- The town hall in Vauvillers
- Location of Vauvillers
- Location within France Location within Hauts-de-France
- Coordinates: 49°50′58″N 2°42′18″E
- Country: France
- Region: Hauts-de-France
- Department: Somme
- Arrondissement: Péronne
- Canton: Ham
- Intercommunality: CC Terre de Picardie

Government
  - Mayor (2020–2026): Annick Maréchal
- Area^{1}: 6.22 km^{2} (2.40 sq mi)
- Elevation: 85 m (279 ft)
- Highest elevation: 93 m (305 ft)
- Lowest elevation: 84 m (276 ft)
- Population (2023): 233
  - Density: 37.5/km^{2} (97.0/sq mi)
- Time zone: UTC+01:00 (CET)
  - Summer (DST): UTC+02:00 (CEST)
- INSEE/Postal code: 80781 /80131
- ^{1} French Land Register data, which excludes lakes, ponds, glaciers > 1 km^{2} (0.386 sq mi or 247 acres) and river estuaries.

Vauvillers is a commune in the Somme department in Hauts-de-France in northern France.

== Geography ==
Vauvillers is situated 21 miles (34 km) west of Amiens, on the D239 road

== Population ==
Historical population
| Year | Pop. | ±% p.a. |
|---|---|---|
| 1968 | 179 | — |
| 1975 | 157 | −1.86% |
| 1982 | 162 | +0.45% |
| 1990 | 189 | +1.95% |
| 1999 | 262 | +3.70% |
| 2007 | 285 | +1.06% |
| 2012 | 271 | −1.00% |
| 2017 | 246 | −1.92% |
| 2023 | 233 | −0.90% |
Source: INSEE

== See also ==
- Communes of the Somme department
