= Herleville =

- Commune
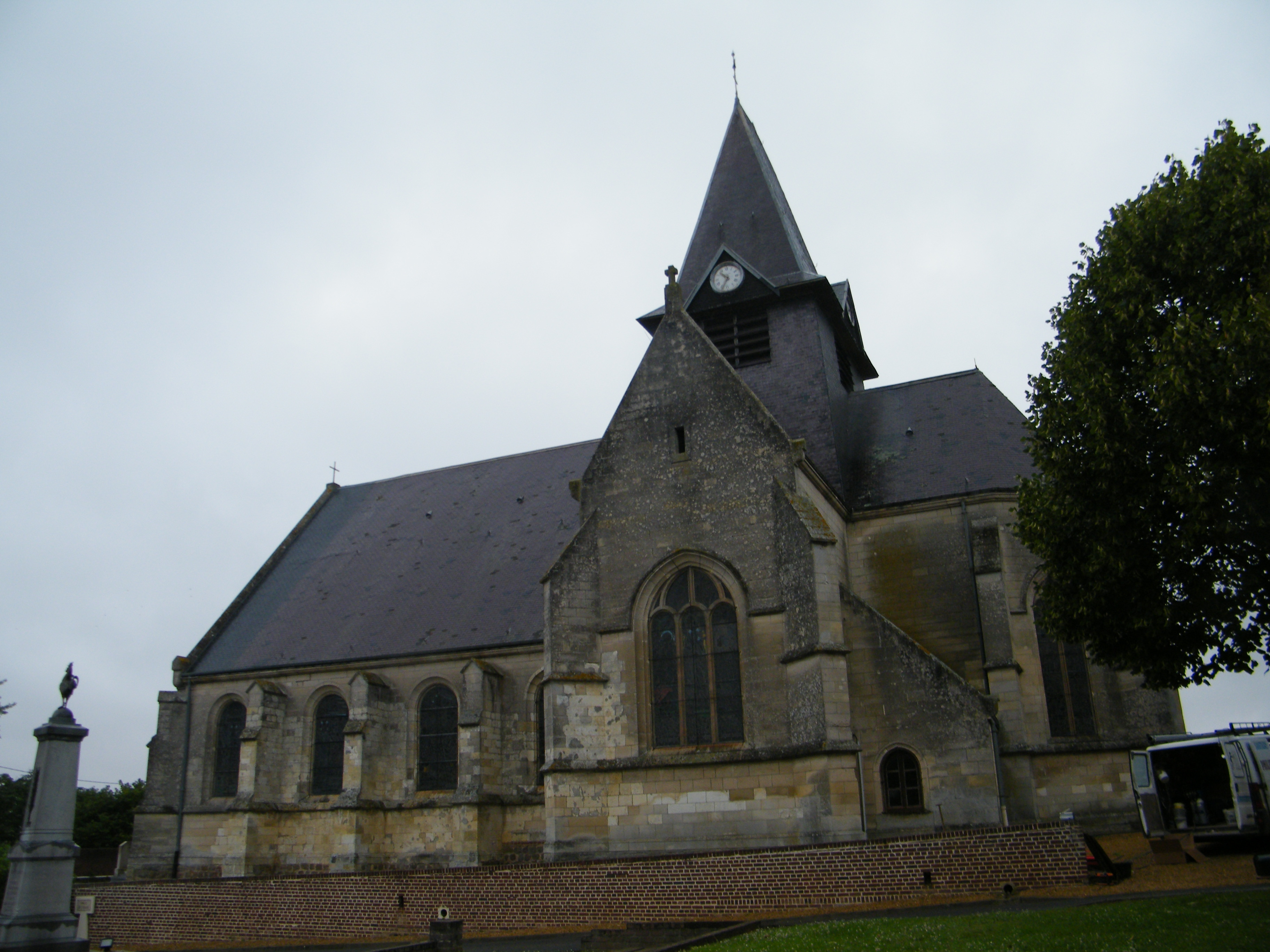
- The church in Herleville
- Location of Herleville
- Location within France Location within Hauts-de-France
- Coordinates: 49°51′46″N 2°45′09″E
- Country: France
- Region: Hauts-de-France
- Department: Somme
- Arrondissement: Péronne
- Canton: Ham
- Intercommunality: CC Terre de Picardie

Government
  - Mayor (2020–2026): Vincent Vanneufville
- Area^{1}: 6.05 km^{2} (2.34 sq mi)
- Elevation: 73 m (240 ft)
- Highest elevation: 91 m (299 ft)
- Lowest elevation: 48 m (157 ft)
- Population (2023): 192
  - Density: 31.7/km^{2} (82.2/sq mi)
- Time zone: UTC+01:00 (CET)
  - Summer (DST): UTC+02:00 (CEST)
- INSEE/Postal code: 80432 /80340
- ^{1} French Land Register data, which excludes lakes, ponds, glaciers > 1 km^{2} (0.386 sq mi or 247 acres) and river estuaries.

Herleville (French pronunciation: [ɛʁləvil]) is a commune in the Somme department in Hauts-de-France in northern France.

== Geography ==
Herleville is situated on the D143 road, some 22 miles (35 km) east of Amiens.

== Population ==
Historical population
Year	Pop.	±% p.a.
1968	142	—
1975	119	−2.49%
1982	109	−1.25%
1990	113	+0.45%
1999	99	−1.46%
2007	121	+2.54%
2012	183	+8.63%
2017	183	+0.00%
2023	192	+0.80%
Source: INSEE

== See also ==
- Communes of the Somme department
