= Soyécourt =

- Commune
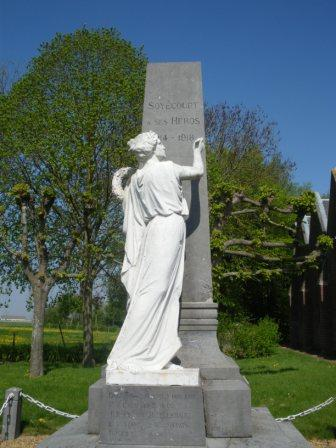
- The war memorial in Soyécourt

- Coat of arms
- Location of Soyécourt
- Location within France Location within Hauts-de-France
- Coordinates: 49°51′47″N 2°47′46″E
- Country: France
- Region: Hauts-de-France
- Department: Somme
- Arrondissement: Péronne
- Canton: Ham
- Intercommunality: CC Terre de Picardie

Government
  - Mayor (2020–2026): Luc Maille
- Area^{1}: 5.16 km^{2} (1.99 sq mi)
- Elevation: 92 m (302 ft)
- Highest elevation: 87 m (285 ft)
- Lowest elevation: 65 m (213 ft)
- Population (2023): 186
  - Density: 36.0/km^{2} (93.4/sq mi)
- Time zone: UTC+01:00 (CET)
  - Summer (DST): UTC+02:00 (CEST)
- INSEE/Postal code: 80741 /80200
- ^{1} French Land Register data, which excludes lakes, ponds, glaciers > 1 km^{2} (0.386 sq mi or 247 acres) and river estuaries.

Soyécourt is a commune in the Somme department in Hauts-de-France in northern France.

== Geography ==
The commune is situated 15 miles (24 km) east of Amiens, on the D79 road, less than a mile from the A29 autoroute.

== Population ==
Historical population
Year	Pop.	±% p.a.
1968	191	—
1975	150	−3.39%
1982	169	+1.72%
1990	185	+1.14%
1999	204	+1.09%
2007	190	−0.88%
2012	174	−1.74%
2017	182	+0.90%
2023	186	+0.36%
Source: INSEE

== Places of interest ==
- St.Martial's church: The church of Soyécourt was destroyed during the First World War. The 12th century font is all that remains of the old church in the replacement building.
- Wallieux wood: The wood of Wallieux is a World War I site and is part of the Circuit of Memory of the First World War. This wood remains pock-marked by shell holes and war tunnels.

== Notable people ==
- Camille de Soyécourt (1757–1849), daughter of Joachim Charles de Seigliere de Belleforiere, Marquis de Soyécourt, was a French Catholic nun who restored the Carmelite Order in France after the French Revolution.

== See also ==
- Communes of the Somme department
