= Proyart =

- Commune
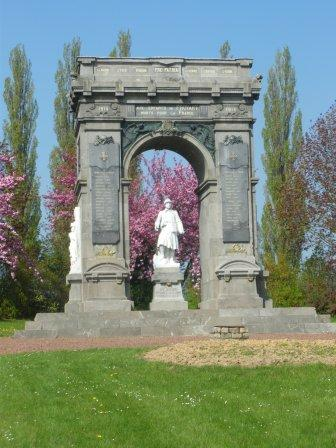
- The war memorial in Proyart
- Location of Proyart
- Location within France Location within Hauts-de-France
- Coordinates: 49°53′16″N 2°42′29″E
- Country: France
- Region: Hauts-de-France
- Department: Somme
- Arrondissement: Péronne
- Canton: Ham
- Intercommunality: CC Terre de Picardie

Government
  - Mayor (2020–2026): Jean-Claude Louvet
- Area^{1}: 9.86 km^{2} (3.81 sq mi)
- Elevation: 85 m (279 ft)
- Highest elevation: 93 m (305 ft)
- Lowest elevation: 32 m (105 ft)
- Population (2023): 761
  - Density: 77.2/km^{2} (200/sq mi)
- Time zone: UTC+01:00 (CET)
  - Summer (DST): UTC+02:00 (CEST)
- INSEE/Postal code: 80644 /80340
- ^{1} French Land Register data, which excludes lakes, ponds, glaciers > 1 km^{2} (0.386 sq mi or 247 acres) and river estuaries.

Proyart is a commune in the Somme department in Hauts-de-France in northern France.

== Geography ==
Proyart is situated on the D329 road, some 20 miles (32 km) east of Amiens.

== Population ==
Historical population
Year	Pop.	±% p.a.
1968	527	—
1975	513	−0.38%
1982	509	−0.11%
1990	514	+0.12%
1999	522	+0.17%
2007	607	+1.90%
2012	662	+1.75%
2017	695	+0.98%
2023	761	+1.52%
Source: INSEE

== Places of interest ==
- War memorial
- The château

== See also ==
- Communes of the Somme department
