= Fresnes-Mazancourt =

- Commune
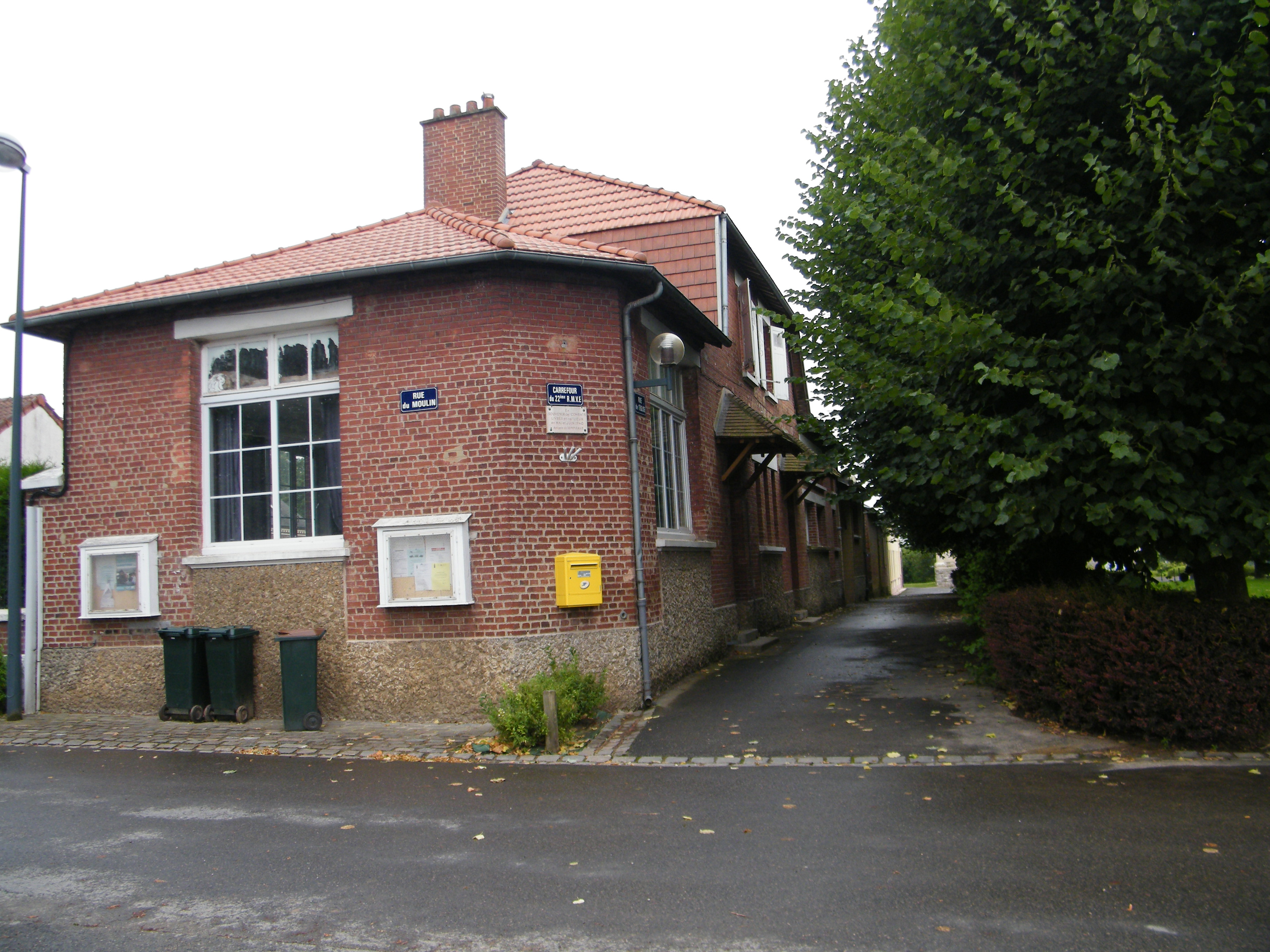
- The town hall in Fresnes-Mazancourt
- Location of Fresnes-Mazancourt
- Location within France Location within Hauts-de-France
- Coordinates: 49°51′08″N 2°51′58″E
- Country: France
- Region: Hauts-de-France
- Department: Somme
- Arrondissement: Péronne
- Canton: Ham
- Intercommunality: CC Terre de Picardie

Government
  - Mayor (2020–2026): Corinne Nevou
- Area^{1}: 5.7 km^{2} (2.2 sq mi)
- Elevation: 80 m (260 ft)
- Highest elevation: 87 m (285 ft)
- Lowest elevation: 60 m (200 ft)
- Population (2023): 158
  - Density: 28/km^{2} (72/sq mi)
- Time zone: UTC+01:00 (CET)
  - Summer (DST): UTC+02:00 (CEST)
- INSEE/Postal code: 80353 /80320
- ^{1} French Land Register data, which excludes lakes, ponds, glaciers > 1 km^{2} (0.386 sq mi or 247 acres) and river estuaries.

Fresnes-Mazancourt (French pronunciation: [fʁɛn mazɑ̃kuʁ]; Picard: Frène-Mazancourt) is a commune in the Somme department in Hauts-de-France in northern France.

== Geography ==
The commune is situated in the east of the département, 31 miles (50 km) east of Amiens at the junction of the D45 and N17, about a mile from the A1 and A29 autoroute junction.

== Population ==
Historical population
Year	Pop.	±% p.a.
1968	162	—
1975	138	−2.26%
1982	109	−3.31%
1990	111	+0.23%
1999	134	+2.11%
2007	104	−3.12%
2012	122	+3.24%
2017	139	+2.64%
2023	158	+2.16%
Source: INSEE

== See also ==
- Communes of the Somme department
