= Framerville-Rainecourt =

- Commune
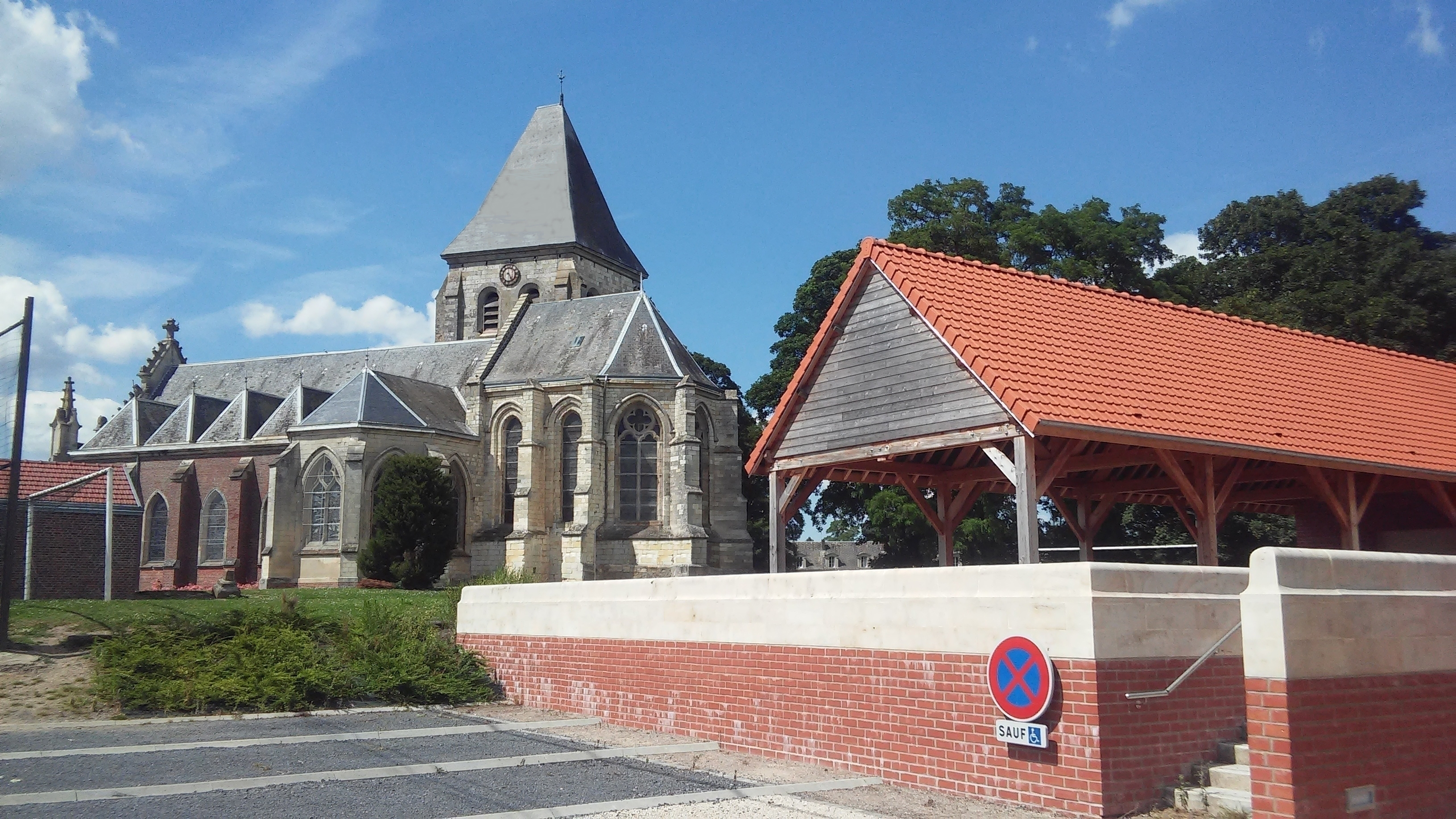
- The church in Framerville
- Location of Framerville-Rainecourt
- Location within France Location within Hauts-de-France
- Coordinates: 49°51′41″N 2°42′50″E
- Country: France
- Region: Hauts-de-France
- Department: Somme
- Arrondissement: Péronne
- Canton: Ham
- Intercommunality: CC Terre de Picardie

Government
  - Mayor (2020–2026): Jean-Philippe Avenel
- Area^{1}: 9.91 km^{2} (3.83 sq mi)
- Elevation: 100 m (330 ft)
- Highest elevation: 94 m (308 ft)
- Lowest elevation: 49 m (161 ft)
- Population (2023): 443
  - Density: 44.7/km^{2} (116/sq mi)
- Time zone: UTC+01:00 (CET)
  - Summer (DST): UTC+02:00 (CEST)
- INSEE/Postal code: 80342 /80131
- ^{1} French Land Register data, which excludes lakes, ponds, glaciers > 1 km^{2} (0.386 sq mi or 247 acres) and river estuaries.

Framerville-Rainecourt (French pronunciation: [fʁamɛʁvil ʁɛnkuʁ]) is a commune in the Somme department in Hauts-de-France in northern France.

== Geography ==
The commune is situated 21 miles (34 km) east of Amiens on the D329 and a few hundred yards from the A29 autoroute.

== Population ==
Historical population
Year	Pop.	±% p.a.
1968	341	—
1975	294	−2.10%
1982	278	−0.80%
1990	237	−1.97%
1999	296	+2.50%
2007	426	+4.66%
2012	471	+2.03%
2017	461	−0.43%
2023	443	−0.66%
Source: INSEE

== See also ==
- Communes of the Somme department
