= Fay, Somme =

Fay
- Commune
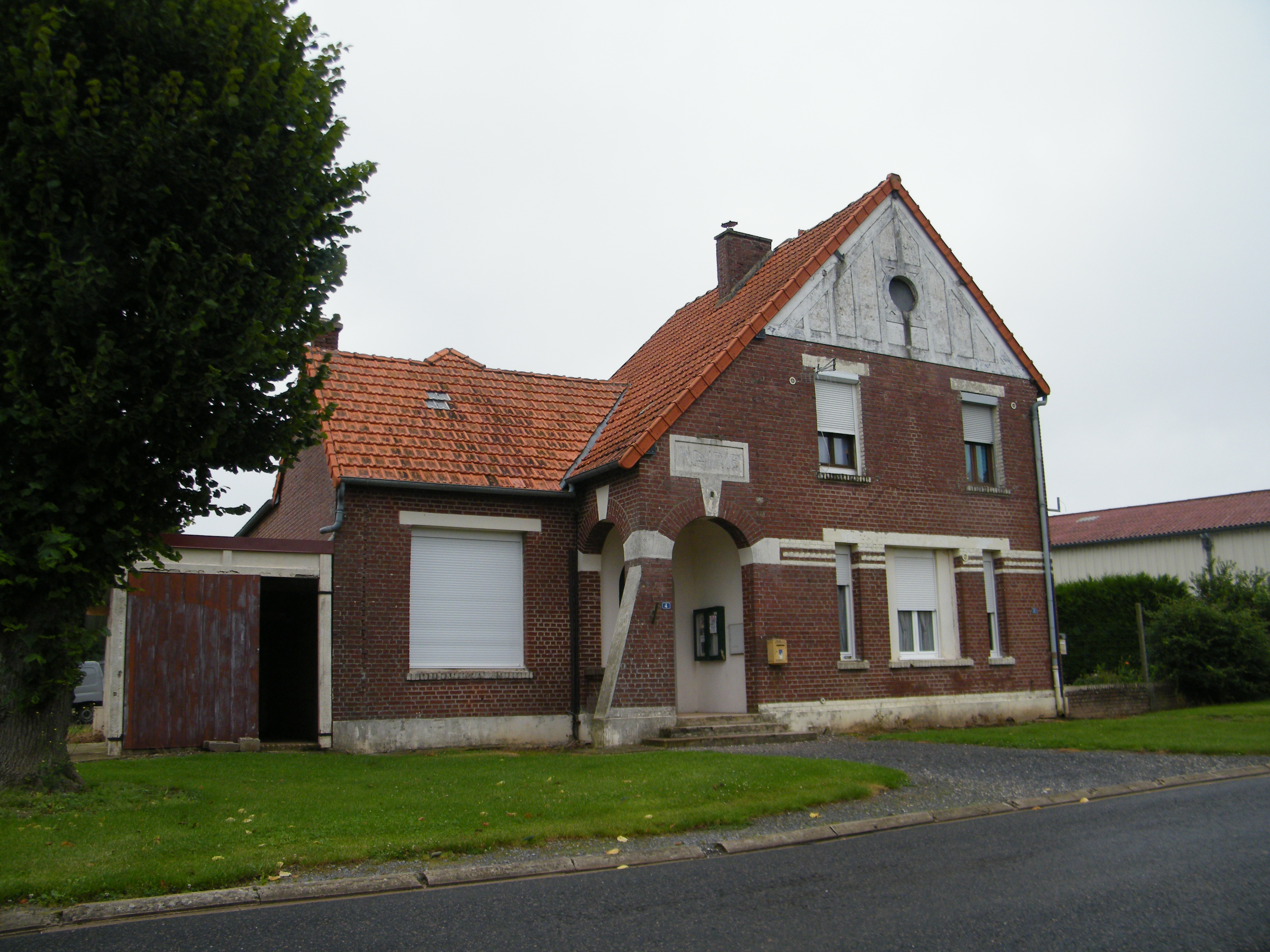
- The town hall in Fay
- Location of Fay
- Location within France Location within Hauts-de-France
- Coordinates: 49°53′11″N 2°48′34″E
- Country: France
- Region: Hauts-de-France
- Department: Somme
- Arrondissement: Péronne
- Canton: Ham
- Intercommunality: CC Terre de Picardie

Government
  - Mayor (2020–2026): Bruno Étévé
- Area^{1}: 3.9 km^{2} (1.5 sq mi)
- Elevation: 71 m (233 ft)
- Highest elevation: 82 m (269 ft)
- Lowest elevation: 52 m (171 ft)
- Population (2023): 91
  - Density: 23/km^{2} (60/sq mi)
- Time zone: UTC+01:00 (CET)
  - Summer (DST): UTC+02:00 (CEST)
- INSEE/Postal code: 80304 /80200
- ^{1} French Land Register data, which excludes lakes, ponds, glaciers > 1 km^{2} (0.386 sq mi or 247 acres) and river estuaries.

Fay (Picard: Fayin) is a commune in the Somme department in Hauts-de-France in northern France.

== Geography ==
Fay is situated on the D164 road, some 30 miles (48 km) east of Amiens and 1 mile (2 km) from the A1 autoroute.

== Population ==
Historical population
Year	Pop.	±% p.a.
1968	75	—
1975	64	−2.24%
1982	70	+1.29%
1990	74	+0.70%
1999	71	−0.46%
2007	107	+5.26%
2012	111	+0.74%
2017	103	−1.48%
2023	91	−2.04%
Source: INSEE

== See also ==
- Communes of the Somme department
