= Chuignes =

- Commune
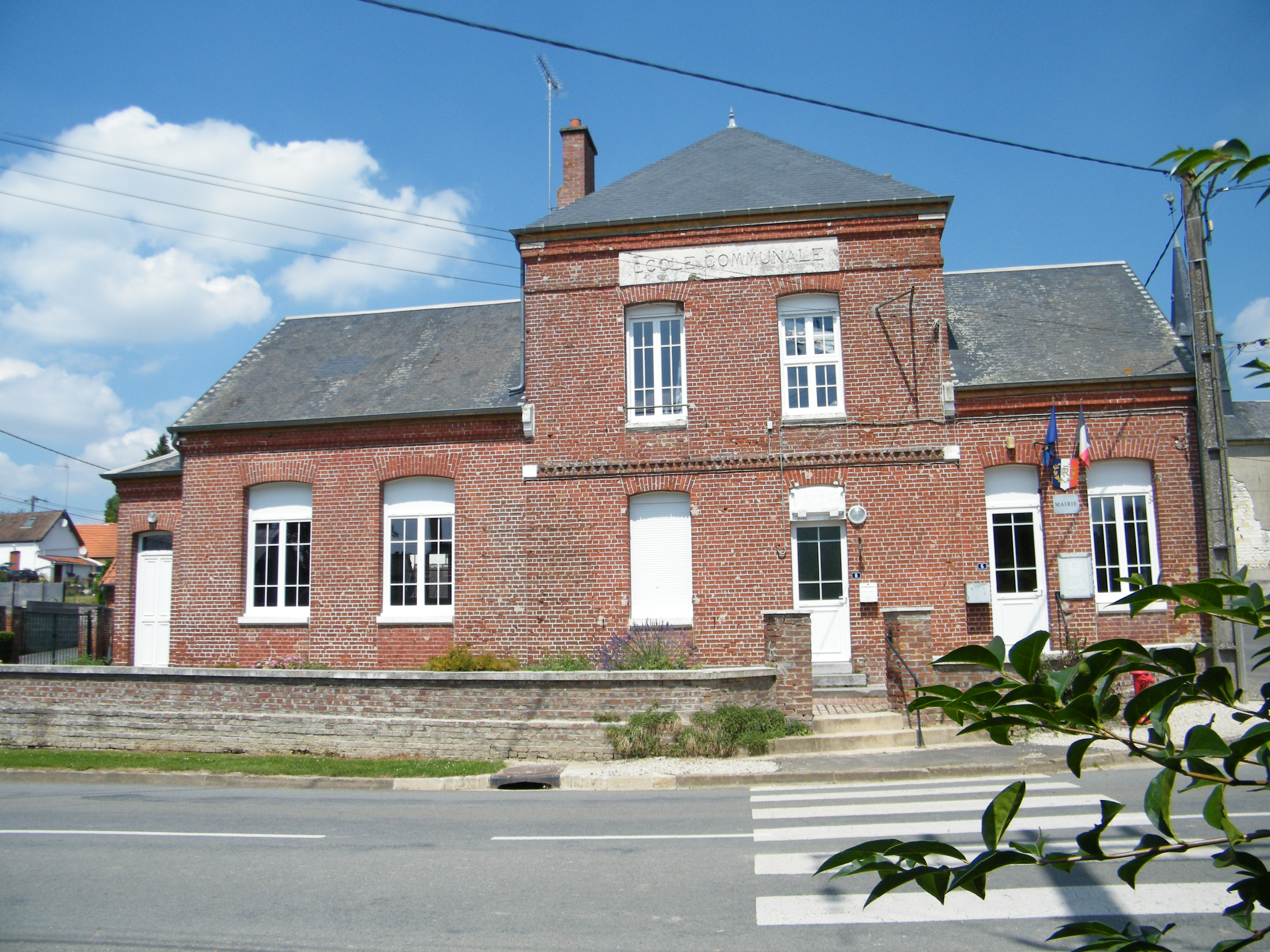
- The town hall and school in Chuignes
- Location of Chuignes
- Location within France Location within Hauts-de-France
- Coordinates: 49°54′03″N 2°45′14″E
- Country: France
- Region: Hauts-de-France
- Department: Somme
- Arrondissement: Péronne
- Canton: Ham
- Intercommunality: CC Terre de Picardie

Government
  - Mayor (2020–2026): Francis Gorlier
- Area^{1}: 4.56 km^{2} (1.76 sq mi)
- Elevation: 80 m (260 ft)
- Highest elevation: 87 m (285 ft)
- Lowest elevation: 41 m (135 ft)
- Population (2023): 152
  - Density: 33.3/km^{2} (86.3/sq mi)
- Time zone: UTC+01:00 (CET)
  - Summer (DST): UTC+02:00 (CEST)
- INSEE/Postal code: 80194 /80340
- ^{1} French Land Register data, which excludes lakes, ponds, glaciers > 1 km^{2} (0.386 sq mi or 247 acres) and river estuaries.

Chuignes (French pronunciation: [ʃɥiɲ]; Picard: Chuingne) is a commune in the Somme department in Hauts-de-France in northern France.

== Geography ==
Chuignes is situated on the D143 and D71 crossroads, near the banks of the river Somme, some 20 miles (32 km) east of Amiens.

== Population ==
Historical population
Year	Pop.	±% p.a.
1968	197	—
1975	168	−2.25%
1982	148	−1.79%
1990	136	−1.05%
1999	127	−0.76%
2007	117	−1.02%
2012	129	+1.97%
2017	134	+0.76%
2023	152	+2.12%
Source: INSEE

== See also ==
- Communes of the Somme department
