= Fontaine-lès-Cappy =

- Commune
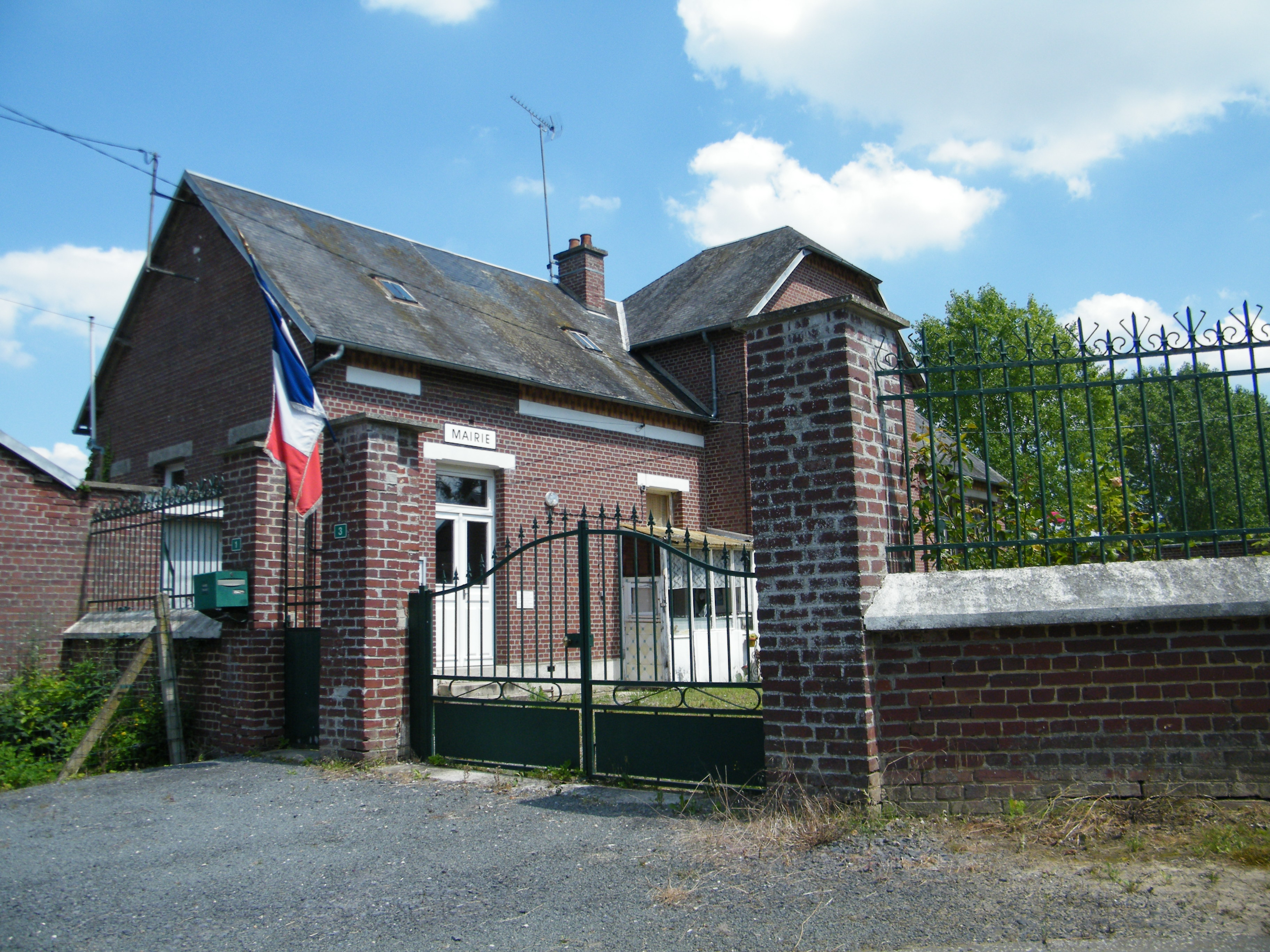
- The town hall in Fontaine-lès-Cappy
- Location of Fontaine-lès-Cappy
- Location within France Location within Hauts-de-France
- Coordinates: 49°53′57″N 2°46′53″E
- Country: France
- Region: Hauts-de-France
- Department: Somme
- Arrondissement: Péronne
- Canton: Ham
- Intercommunality: CC Terre de Picardie

Government
  - Mayor (2020–2026): Joseph Normand
- Area^{1}: 3.47 km^{2} (1.34 sq mi)
- Elevation: 41 m (135 ft)
- Highest elevation: 91 m (299 ft)
- Lowest elevation: 47 m (154 ft)
- Population (2023): 54
  - Density: 16/km^{2} (40/sq mi)
- Time zone: UTC+01:00 (CET)
  - Summer (DST): UTC+02:00 (CEST)
- INSEE/Postal code: 80325 /80340
- ^{1} French Land Register data, which excludes lakes, ponds, glaciers > 1 km^{2} (0.386 sq mi or 247 acres) and river estuaries.

Fontaine-lès-Cappy (French pronunciation: [fɔ̃tɛn lɛ kapi], literally Fontaine near Cappy; Picard: Fontainne-lès-Capin) is a commune in the Somme department in Hauts-de-France in northern France.

== Geography ==
The commune is situated on the D71 road, some 25 miles (40 km) east of Amiens.

== Population ==
Historical population
Year	Pop.	±% p.a.
1968	97	—
1975	76	−3.43%
1982	82	+1.09%
1990	69	−2.13%
1999	53	−2.89%
2007	42	−2.87%
2012	51	+3.96%
2017	51	+0.00%
2023	54	+0.96%
Source: INSEE

== See also ==
- Communes of the Somme department
