= Belloy-en-Santerre =

- Commune
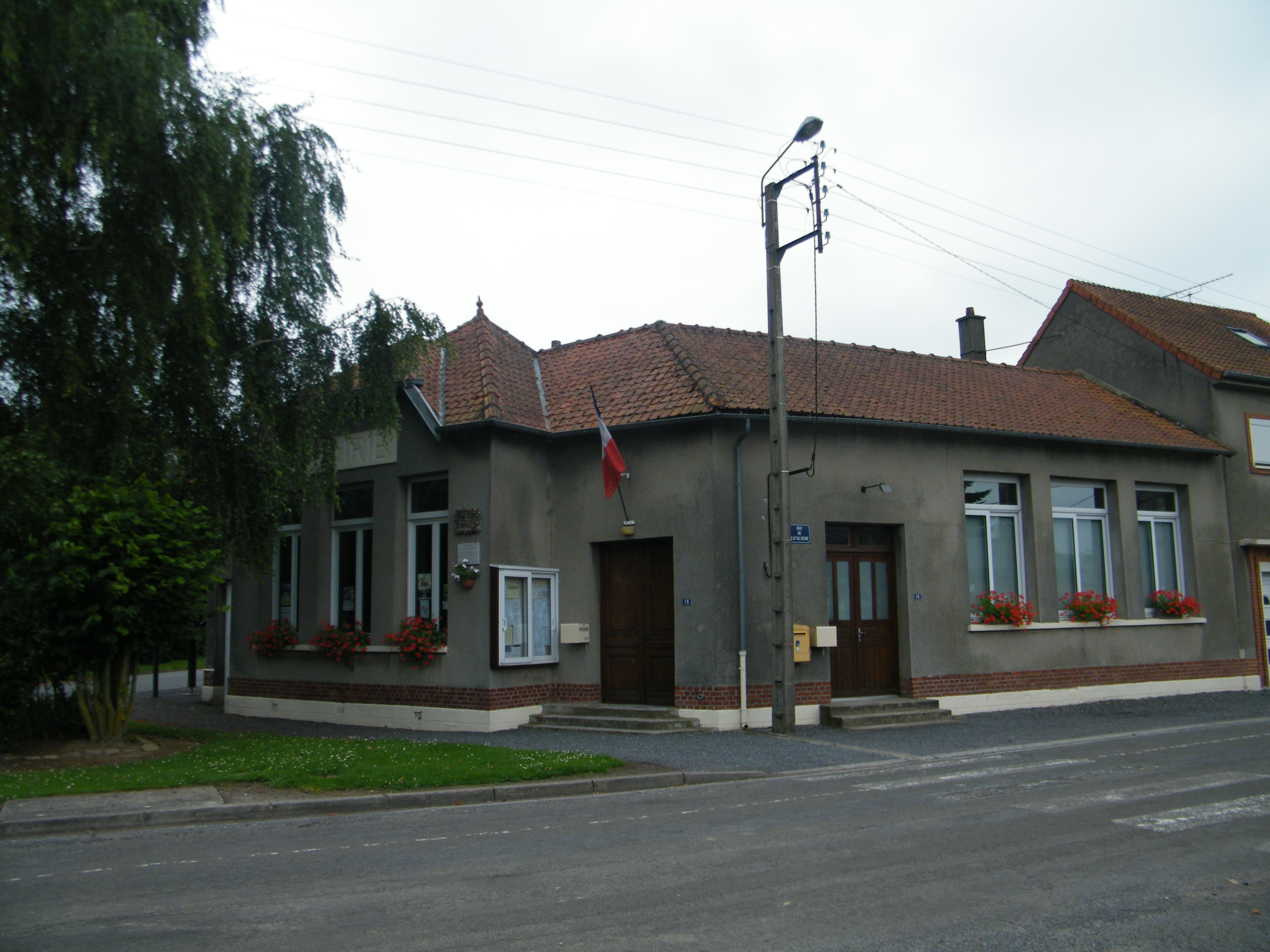
- The town hall in Belloy-en-Santerre
- Location of Belloy-en-Santerre
- Location within France Location within Hauts-de-France
- Coordinates: 49°53′20″N 2°51′22″E
- Country: France
- Region: Hauts-de-France
- Department: Somme
- Arrondissement: Péronne
- Canton: Ham
- Intercommunality: CC Terre de Picardie

Government
  - Mayor (2020–2026): Laurent Potier
- Area^{1}: 5.49 km^{2} (2.12 sq mi)
- Elevation: 76 m (249 ft)
- Highest elevation: 86 m (282 ft)
- Lowest elevation: 57 m (187 ft)
- Population (2023): 149
  - Density: 27.1/km^{2} (70.3/sq mi)
- Time zone: UTC+01:00 (CET)
  - Summer (DST): UTC+02:00 (CEST)
- INSEE/Postal code: 80080 /80200
- ^{1} French Land Register data, which excludes lakes, ponds, glaciers > 1 km^{2} (0.386 sq mi or 247 acres) and river estuaries.

Belloy-en-Santerre (French pronunciation: [bɛlwa ɑ̃ sɑ̃tɛʁ], literally Belloy in Santerre) is a commune in the Somme department in Hauts-de-France in northern France.

== Geography ==
The commune is situated on the D79 road, about 1 mile (2 km) from the junction of the A1 autoroute and the N29, some 30 miles (48 km) east of Amiens.

== History ==
An aerial photograph taken in 1967 shows the outline of a large, rectangular, south-facing Gallo-Roman villa on the site of present-day Belloy.

== Population ==
Historical population
| Year | Pop. | ±% p.a. |
|---|---|---|
| 1968 | 159 | — |
| 1975 | 172 | +1.13% |
| 1982 | 169 | −0.25% |
| 1990 | 162 | −0.53% |
| 1999 | 167 | +0.34% |
| 2007 | 179 | +0.87% |
| 2012 | 163 | −1.86% |
| 2017 | 149 | −1.78% |
| 2023 | 149 | +0.00% |
Source: INSEE

== Personalities ==
Alan Seeger, American poet, who had joined the French Foreign Legion, died here during the Battle of the Somme in 1916.

== See also ==
- Communes of the Somme department
