= Dompierre-Becquincourt =

- Commune
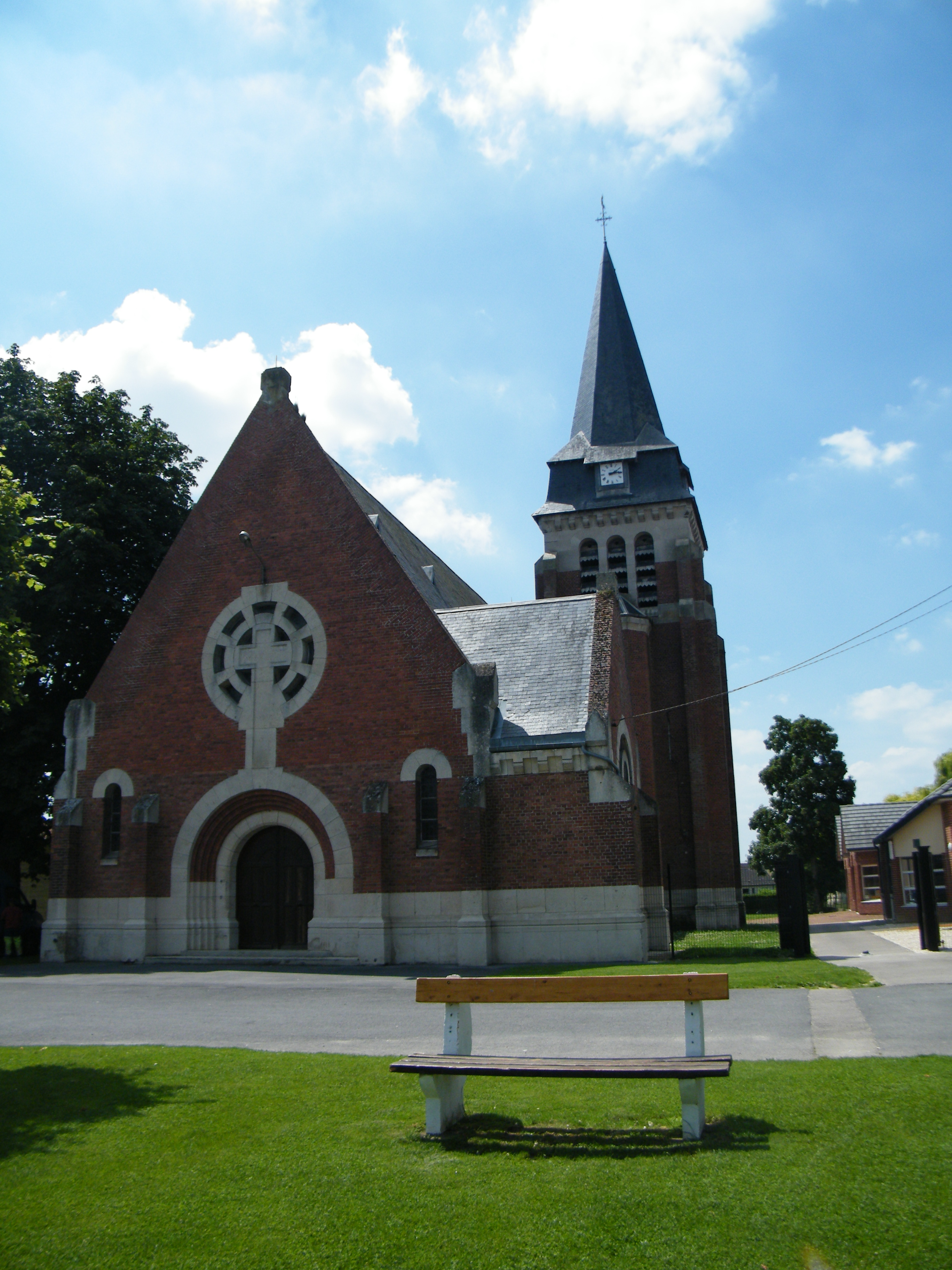
- The church in Dompierre-Becquincourt
- Location of Dompierre-Becquincourt
- Location within France Location within Hauts-de-France
- Coordinates: 49°54′29″N 2°48′21″E
- Country: France
- Region: Hauts-de-France
- Department: Somme
- Arrondissement: Péronne
- Canton: Ham
- Intercommunality: CC Terre de Picardie

Government
  - Mayor (2020–2026): Jean-Luc Maillard
- Area^{1}: 11.05 km^{2} (4.27 sq mi)
- Elevation: 100 m (330 ft)
- Highest elevation: 92 m (302 ft)
- Lowest elevation: 54 m (177 ft)
- Population (2023): 709
  - Density: 64.2/km^{2} (166/sq mi)
- Time zone: UTC+01:00 (CET)
  - Summer (DST): UTC+02:00 (CEST)
- INSEE/Postal code: 80247 /80980
- ^{1} French Land Register data, which excludes lakes, ponds, glaciers > 1 km^{2} (0.386 sq mi or 247 acres) and river estuaries.

Dompierre-Becquincourt (French pronunciation: [dɔ̃pjɛʁ bɛkɛ̃kuʁ]) is a commune in the Somme department in Hauts-de-France in northern France.

== Geography ==
The commune is situated on the D71 road, some 30 miles (48 km) east of Amiens.

== Population ==
Historical population
Year	Pop.	±% p.a.
1968	703	—
1975	635	−1.44%
1982	646	+0.25%
1990	664	+0.34%
1999	642	−0.37%
2007	630	−0.24%
2012	671	+1.27%
2017	706	+1.02%
2023	709	+0.07%
Source: INSEE

== Gallery ==
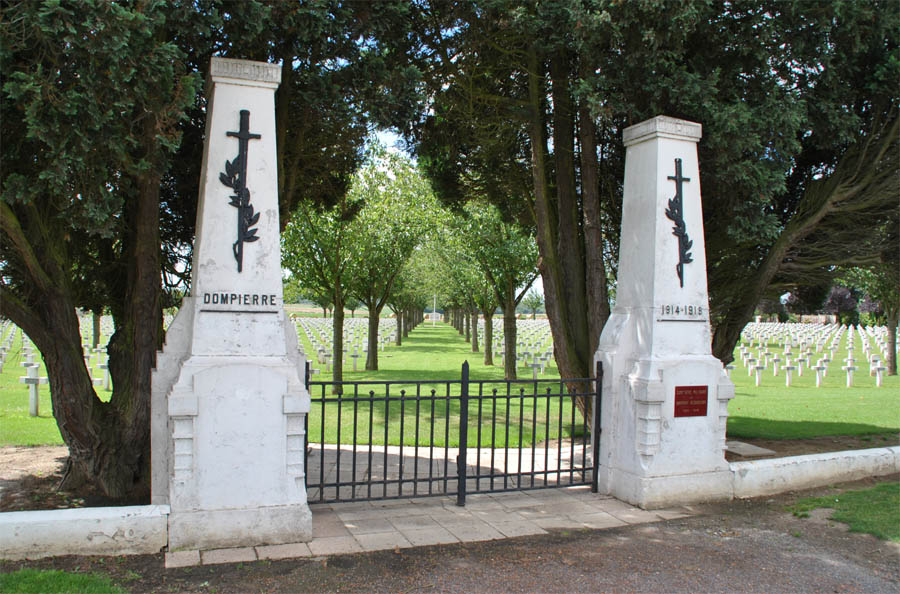
French World War I cemetery

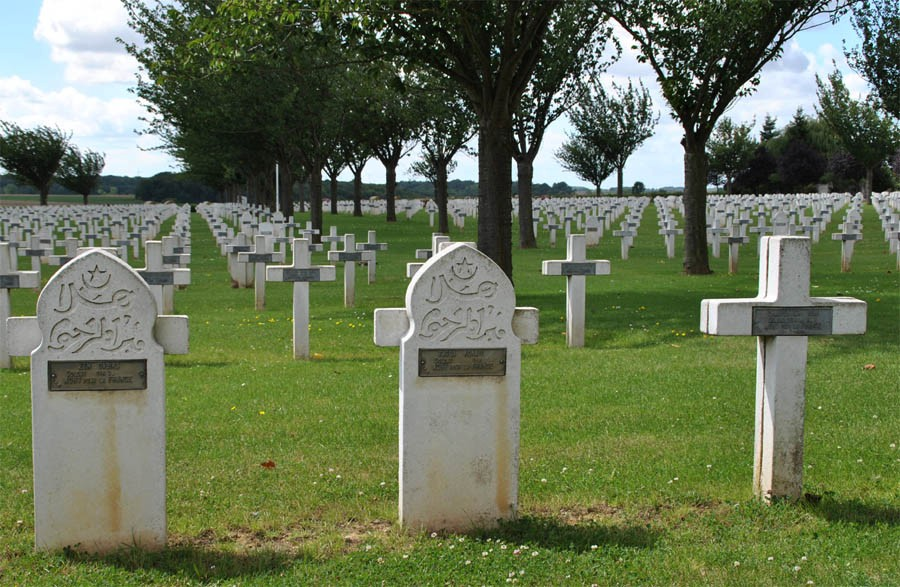
French World War I cemetery

== See also ==
- Froissy Dompierre Light Railway
- Communes of the Somme department
