= Foucaucourt-en-Santerre =

- Commune
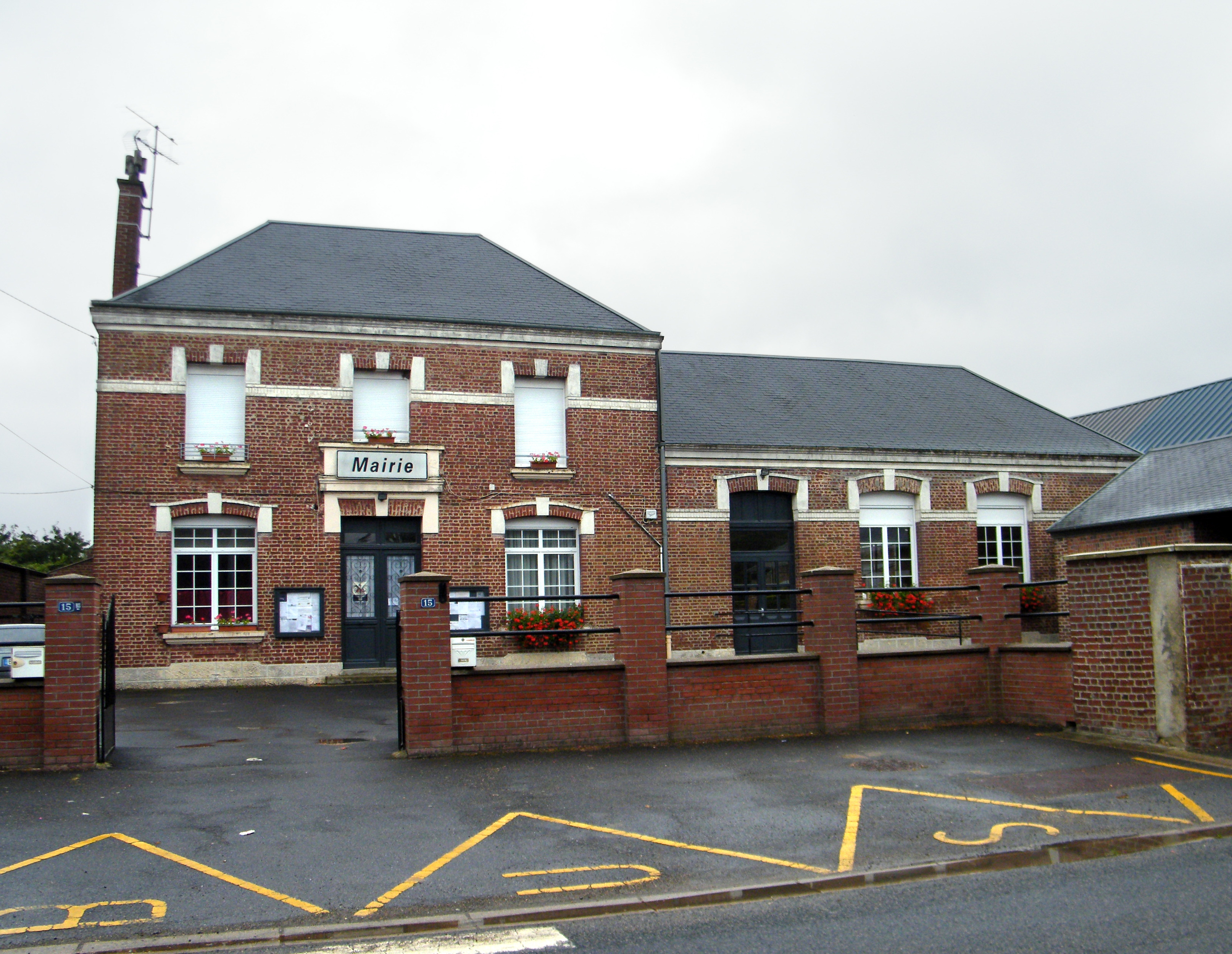
- The town hall in Foucaucourt-en-Santerre
- Location of Foucaucourt-en-Santerre
- Location within France Location within Hauts-de-France
- Coordinates: 49°52′28″N 2°46′26″E
- Country: France
- Region: Hauts-de-France
- Department: Somme
- Arrondissement: Péronne
- Canton: Ham
- Intercommunality: CC Terre de Picardie

Government
  - Mayor (2024–2026): Fabien Rubin
- Area^{1}: 6.91 km^{2} (2.67 sq mi)
- Elevation: 82 m (269 ft)
- Highest elevation: 87 m (285 ft)
- Lowest elevation: 50 m (160 ft)
- Population (2023): 235
  - Density: 34.0/km^{2} (88.1/sq mi)
- Time zone: UTC+01:00 (CET)
  - Summer (DST): UTC+02:00 (CEST)
- INSEE/Postal code: 80335 /80340
- ^{1} French Land Register data, which excludes lakes, ponds, glaciers > 1 km^{2} (0.386 sq mi or 247 acres) and river estuaries.

Foucaucourt-en-Santerre (French pronunciation: [fukokuʁ ɑ̃ sɑ̃tɛʁ]; Picard: Fouquécourt-in-Santérre) is a commune in the Somme department in Hauts-de-France in northern France.

== Geography ==
The commune is situated on the N29 road, some 24 miles (39 km) east of Amiens.

== Population ==
Historical population
Year	Pop.	±% p.a.
1968	277	—
1975	261	−0.85%
1982	234	−1.55%
1990	252	+0.93%
1999	223	−1.35%
2007	260	+1.94%
2012	284	+1.78%
2017	268	−1.15%
2023	235	−2.17%
Source: INSEE

== World War I ==
During World War I the village hosted a temporary aerodrome to the west of the village opposite the cemetery. It was first held by the Germans, and fell into allied hands by the end of the war. The German Jagdstaffel 34 was stationed here from April to July 1918, and RAF 208 Squadron moved in on 22 September 1918.

== Places of interest ==
- The war memorial
- The Roman road, the ‘Chaussée Brunehaut’, which passes by the village.

== See also ==
- Communes of the Somme department
