= Puzeaux =

- Commune
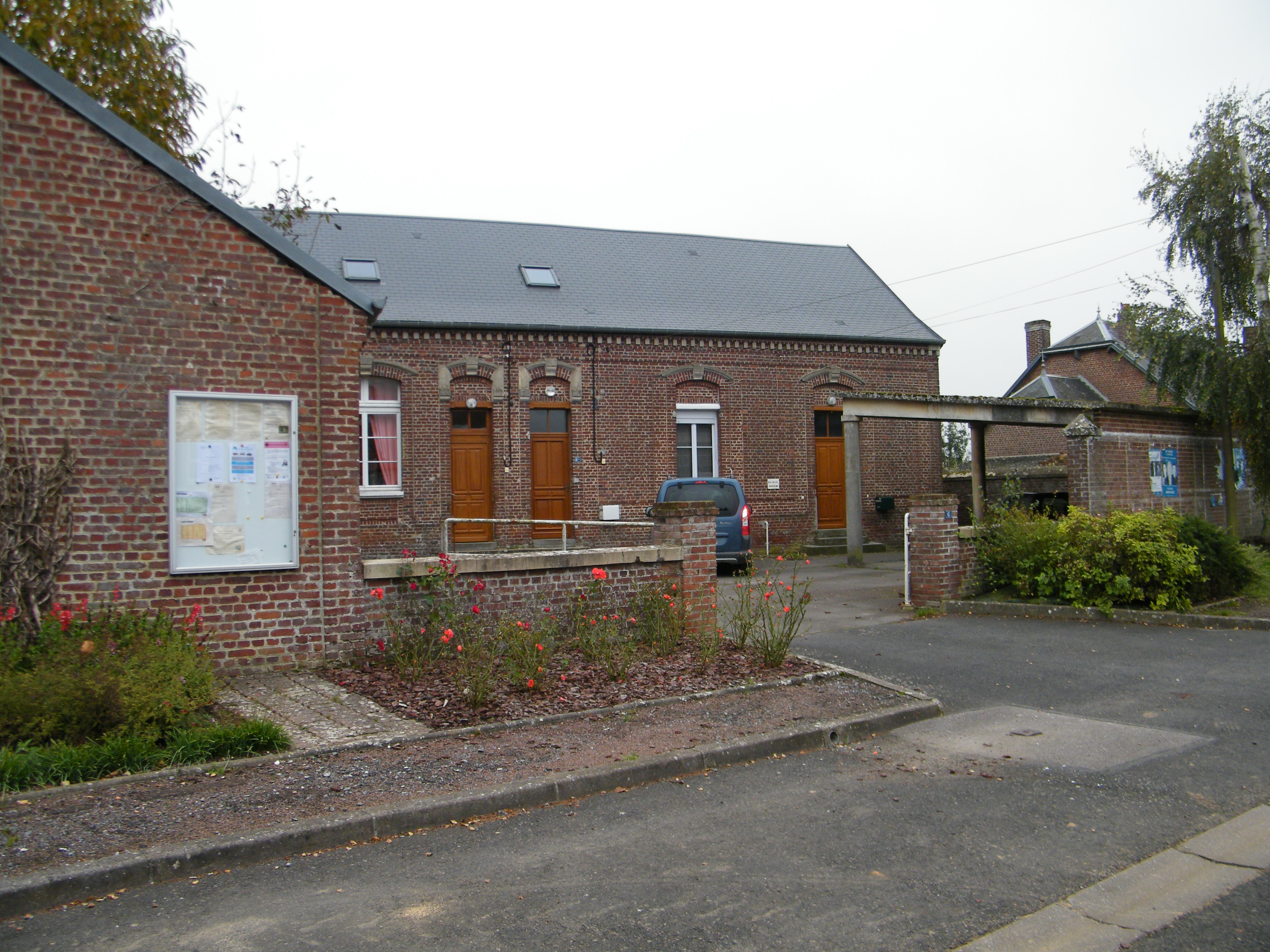
- The town hall in Puzeaux
- Location of Puzeaux
- Location within France Location within Hauts-de-France
- Coordinates: 49°47′56″N 2°49′21″E
- Country: France
- Region: Hauts-de-France
- Department: Somme
- Arrondissement: Péronne
- Canton: Ham
- Intercommunality: CC Terre de Picardie

Government
  - Mayor (2020–2026): Jean-Louis Ramecki
- Area^{1}: 3.75 km^{2} (1.45 sq mi)
- Elevation: 87 m (285 ft)
- Highest elevation: 89 m (292 ft)
- Lowest elevation: 79 m (259 ft)
- Population (2023): 278
  - Density: 74.1/km^{2} (192/sq mi)
- Time zone: UTC+01:00 (CET)
  - Summer (DST): UTC+02:00 (CEST)
- INSEE/Postal code: 80647 /80320
- ^{1} French Land Register data, which excludes lakes, ponds, glaciers > 1 km^{2} (0.386 sq mi or 247 acres) and river estuaries.

Puzeaux (French pronunciation: [pyzo]) is a commune in the Somme department in Hauts-de-France in northern France.

== Geography ==
Puzeaux is situated on the D337 road, some 20 miles (32 km) southeast of Amiens.

== Population ==
Historical population
Year	Pop.	±% p.a.
1968	213	—
1975	215	+0.13%
1982	206	−0.61%
1990	225	+1.11%
1999	210	−0.76%
2007	241	+1.74%
2012	261	+1.61%
2017	298	+2.69%
2023	278	−1.15%
Source: INSEE

== See also ==
- Communes of the Somme department
