= Berny-en-Santerre =

- Commune
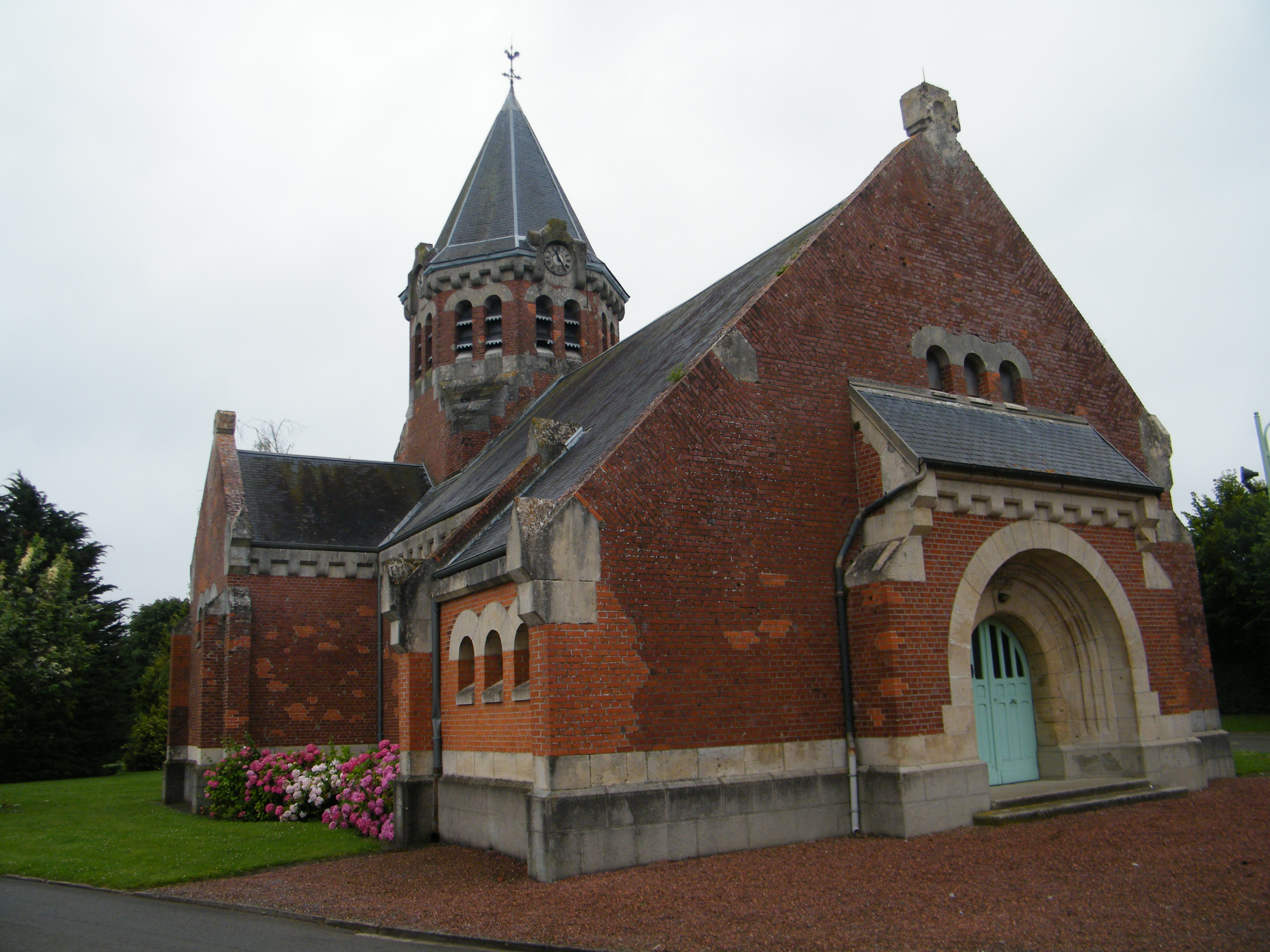
- The church in Berny-en-Santerre
- Location of Berny-en-Santerre
- Location within France Location within Hauts-de-France
- Coordinates: 49°51′56″N 2°51′02″E
- Country: France
- Region: Hauts-de-France
- Department: Somme
- Arrondissement: Péronne
- Canton: Ham
- Intercommunality: CC Terre de Picardie

Government
  - Mayor (2020–2026): Francis Leroy
- Area^{1}: 4.43 km^{2} (1.71 sq mi)
- Elevation: 140 m (460 ft)
- Highest elevation: 87 m (285 ft)
- Lowest elevation: 62 m (203 ft)
- Population (2023): 155
  - Density: 35.0/km^{2} (90.6/sq mi)
- Time zone: UTC+01:00 (CET)
  - Summer (DST): UTC+02:00 (CEST)
- INSEE/Postal code: 80090 /80200
- ^{1} French Land Register data, which excludes lakes, ponds, glaciers > 1 km^{2} (0.386 sq mi or 247 acres) and river estuaries.

Berny-en-Santerre (French pronunciation: [bɛʁni ɑ̃ sɑ̃tɛʁ], literally Berny in Santerre; Picard: Bérny-in-Santérre) is a commune in the Somme department in Hauts-de-France in northern France.

== Geography ==
The commune is situated at the junction of the D146 and D150 roads, one mile from the junction of the A1 and A29 autoroutes, some 30 miles (48 km) east of Amiens.

== Population ==
Historical population
Year	Pop.	±% p.a.
1968	174	—
1975	169	−0.42%
1982	146	−2.07%
1990	149	+0.25%
1999	153	+0.29%
2007	146	−0.58%
2012	152	+0.81%
2017	154	+0.26%
2023	155	+0.11%
Source: INSEE

== Personalities ==
- Galiot Mandat de Grancey

== See also ==
- Communes of the Somme department
