= Ablaincourt-Pressoir =

Commune in Hauts-de-France, France

- Commune
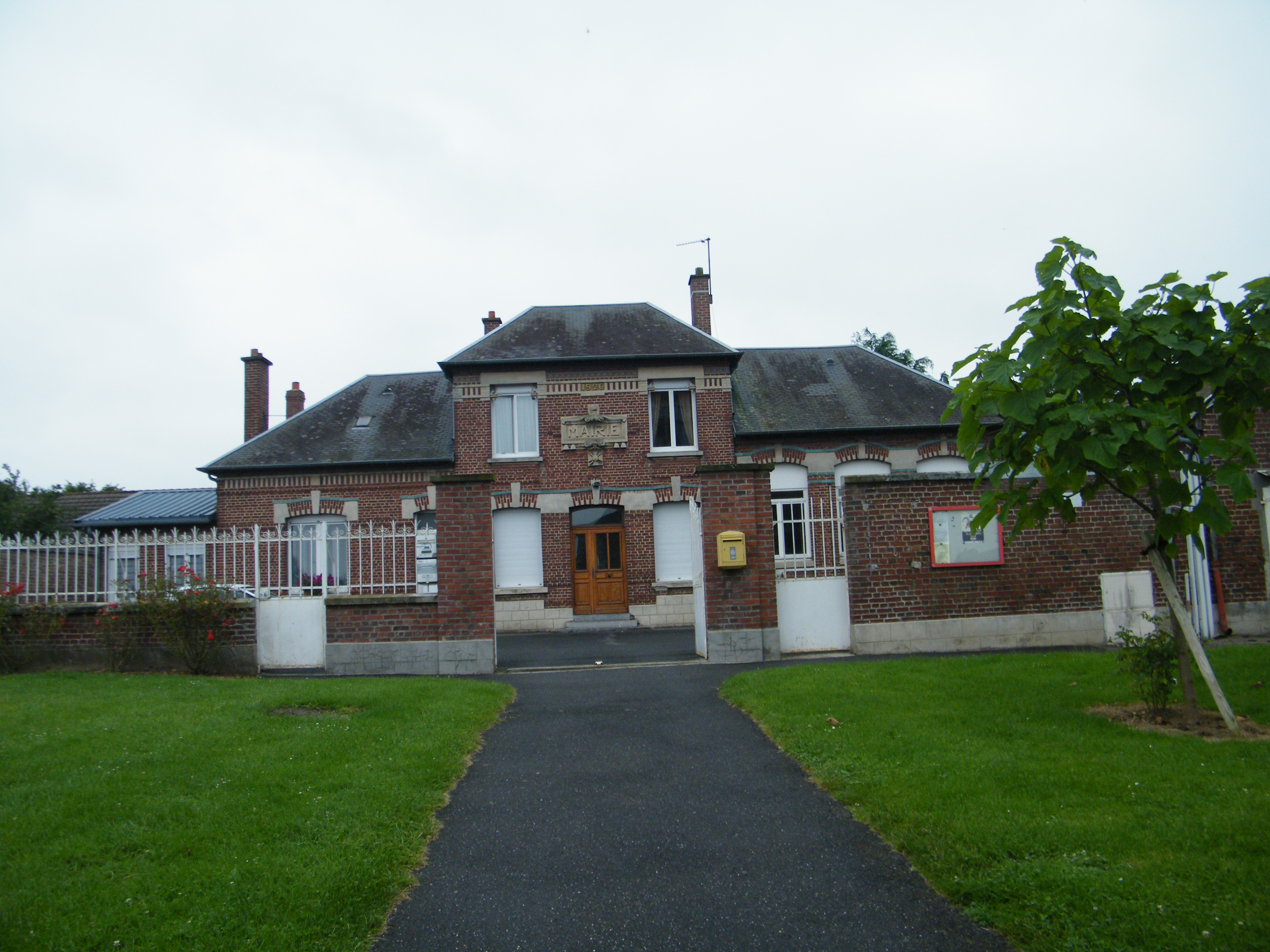
- The town hall of Ablaincourt
- Location of Ablaincourt-Pressoir
- Location within France Location within Hauts-de-France
- Coordinates: 49°50′26″N 2°49′23″E
- Country: France
- Region: Hauts-de-France
- Department: Somme
- Arrondissement: Péronne
- Canton: Ham
- Intercommunality: Terre de Picardie

Government
  - Mayor (2020–2026): Dany Domont
- Area^{1}: 9.46 km^{2} (3.65 sq mi)
- Elevation: 83 m (272 ft)
- Highest elevation: 88 m (289 ft)
- Lowest elevation: 67 m (220 ft)
- Population (2023): 263
  - Density: 27.8/km^{2} (72.0/sq mi)
- Demonym(s): Ablaincourtois, Ablaincourtoises
- Time zone: UTC+01:00 (CET)
  - Summer (DST): UTC+02:00 (CEST)
- INSEE/Postal code: 80002 /80320
- ^{1} French Land Register data, which excludes lakes, ponds, glaciers > 1 km^{2} (0.386 sq mi or 247 acres) and river estuaries.

Ablaincourt-Pressoir (Picard: Ablaincourt-Pressor) is a commune in the Somme department in Hauts-de-France in northern France. The commune was created in 1966 by the merger of the former communes Ablaincourt and Pressoir.

== Geography ==
Ablaincourt-Pressoir is found in the Santerre sub-region, where early French kings made their base, at Noyon.
The town is in a strategic position close to the intersections of the A1 Paris-Lille autoroute and the A29 autoroute between Amiens and Saint-Quentin. Two departmental roads meet nearby (the D150 and the D164). The town also has an international TGV rail station, the Gare TGV Haute-Picardie, nicknamed "The sugar-beet station" named after the predominant crop of the area.

== Etymology; Ancient forms of the names ==
- Ablaincourt

Abatix Curtis, Habelini Curtis (1046), Ablani Curtis, Ableni Curia (1106), Abbecourt (1144), Abiaucourt (1215), Ablaincort (1230), Ablincourt (1733) and finally, Ablaincourt, which signifies an abbey.

- Pressoir

Pressurs or Drêsur (1180).

== History ==
- Ablaincourt

In 1215, Jean I de Nesle built a castle here. Remains of the motte can still be seen, which marks out the position of the keep.

In 1648, possession of the fiefdom of Ablaincourt passed from the Blattepière family to the Mathieu family.

During World War I Ablaincourt et Pressoir were at the centre of the Battle of the Somme. Both communes were totally ruined by the fighting.

== Demographics ==
Data before 1966 in the table below refer to the old commune Ablaincourt, before the merger with Pressoir. The population of Pressoir was 144 in 1851, 106 in 1896 and 64 in 1962.

Historical population

Year	Pop.	±% p.a.
1793	388	—
1800	413	+0.90%
1806	436	+0.91%
1821	466	+0.44%
1831	452	−0.30%
1836	444	−0.36%
1841	464	+0.89%
1846	433	−1.37%
1851	445	+0.55%
1856	419	−1.20%
1861	393	−1.27%
1866	368	−1.31%
1872	367	−0.05%
1876	353	−0.97%
1881	365	+0.67%
1886	334	−1.76%
1891	327	−0.42%
1896	312	−0.93%
1901	295	−1.11%

Year	Pop.	±% p.a.
1906	281	−0.97%
1911	259	−1.62%
1921	76	−11.54%
1926	159	+15.91%
1931	180	+2.51%
1936	200	+2.13%
1946	158	−2.33%
1954	177	+1.43%
1962	191	+0.96%
1968	224	+2.69%
1975	194	−2.03%
1982	185	−0.68%
1990	206	+1.35%
1999	227	+1.08%
2007	256	+1.51%
2012	275	+1.44%
2017	266	−0.66%
2023	263	−0.19%

Source: EHESS (1793-1999) and INSEE

== People ==
- Eloi Driencourt, born in the hamlet of Bovent, Ablaincourt, doctor of the Sorbonne and for a while, advisor to Louis XV's queen, Maria Leszczyńska (1703–1768).
- Ludovic Hulin was elected in March 1995 and became the youngest mayor of Ablaincourt-Pressoir, at the age of 28.
- Reinhard Johannes Sorge, a German Roman Catholic poet and dramatist, died at a First Aid post located at the ruins of Ablaincourt-Pressoir on 20 July 1916. Sorge had been wounded by a hand grenade during the Battle of the Somme.

== See also ==
- Communes of the Somme department
