= Lihons =

- Commune
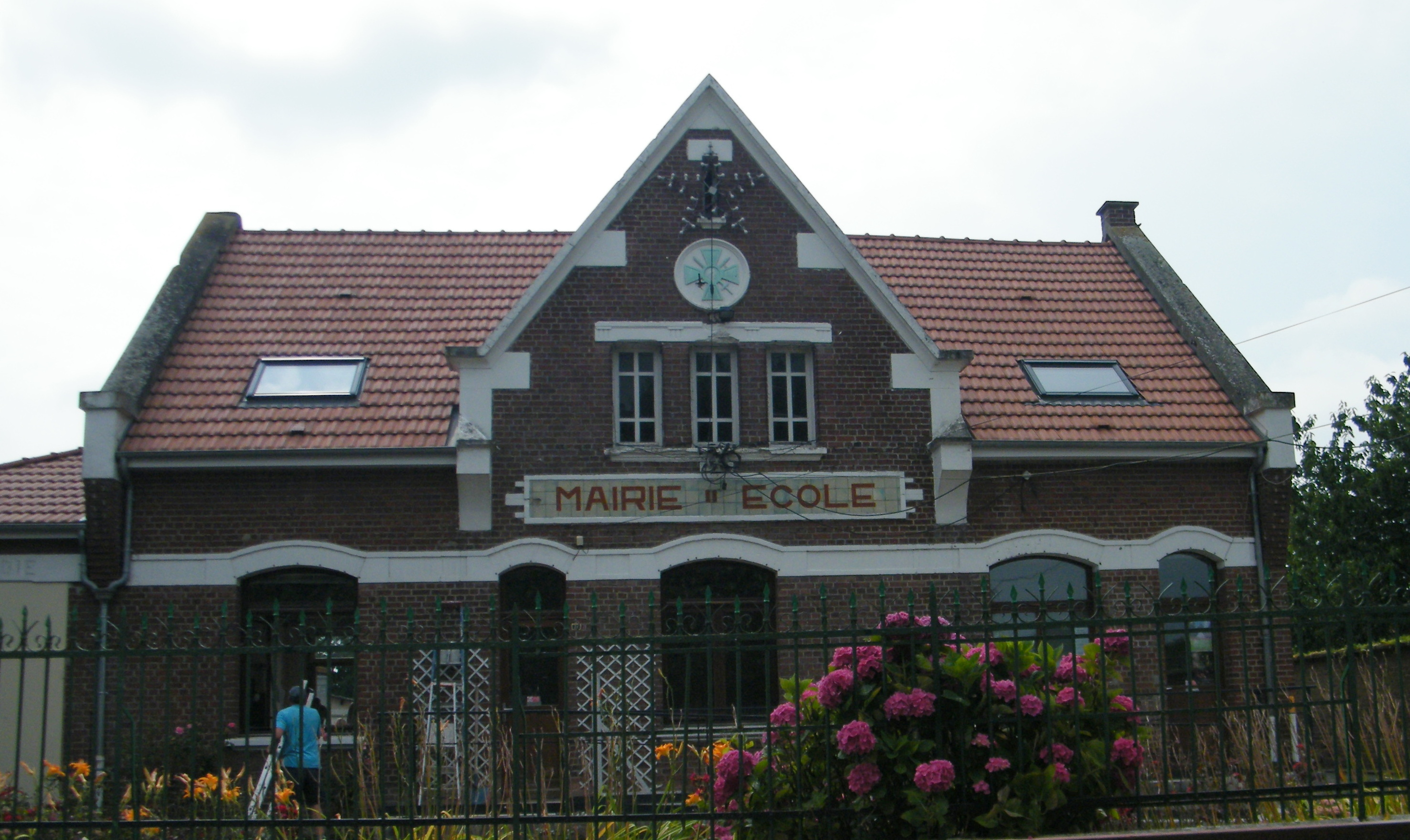
- The town hall and school in Lihons

- Coat of arms
- Location of Lihons
- Location within France Location within Hauts-de-France
- Coordinates: 49°49′30″N 2°46′01″E
- Country: France
- Region: Hauts-de-France
- Department: Somme
- Arrondissement: Péronne
- Canton: Ham
- Intercommunality: Terre de Picardie

Government
  - Mayor (2020–2026): Robert Billoré
- Area^{1}: 12.42 km^{2} (4.80 sq mi)
- Elevation: 94 m (308 ft)
- Highest elevation: 112 m (367 ft)
- Lowest elevation: 84 m (276 ft)
- Population (2023): 463
  - Density: 37.3/km^{2} (96.6/sq mi)
- Time zone: UTC+01:00 (CET)
  - Summer (DST): UTC+02:00 (CEST)
- INSEE/Postal code: 80481 /80320
- ^{1} French Land Register data, which excludes lakes, ponds, glaciers > 1 km^{2} (0.386 sq mi or 247 acres) and river estuaries.

Lihons (French pronunciation: [li.ɔ̃s]) is a commune in the Somme department in Hauts-de-France in northern France.

== Geography ==
Lihons is situated 20 miles (32 km) east of Amiens, on the D337 road

== Population ==
Historical population
Year	Pop.	±% p.a.
1968	384	—
1975	366	−0.68%
1982	321	−1.86%
1990	366	+1.65%
1999	377	+0.33%
2007	383	+0.20%
2012	389	+0.31%
2017	442	+2.59%
2023	463	+0.78%
Source: INSEE

== Places of interest ==
The tomb of Prince Murat.

Louis Marie Joachim Napoléon Michel Prince Murat was a descendant (a great-great grandson) of Napoleon’s brother-in-law, Joachim Murat, the first recipient of the title. He volunteered during World War I and joined the 5th infantry regiment of cuirassiers. He died on the western front in Lihons on 21 August 1916, aged 20 years. The monument was built by his family after the war and later transferred to the commune for maintenance (in 1961).

== See also ==
- Communes of the Somme department
