= Fred Joaillier =

French jewellery and watch brand

- Company type: Limited company
- Industry: Specialist retail sale of watches and jewellery in dedicated shops
- Founded: 1936; 90 years ago
- Founder: Fred Samuel
- Headquarters: Paris, France
- Key people: Vincent Reynes, CEO
- Number of employees: 346 in 2020
- Parent: LVMH
- Website: https://www.fred.com/

Fred Joaillier, more commonly known as Fred, is a French jewellery and watch brand founded in 1936 by Fred Samuel in Paris and operated by the company "Fred Paris".

The company has more than fifty of its own shops worldwide and various retail outlets in some thirty countries.

The company has been owned by the LVMH Group since 1995.

== History ==
=== Foundation and beginnings (1925–1944) ===
The son of Alsatians who emigrated to Argentina fleeing the German annexation that followed the 1870 war, Fred Samuel was born in Buenos Aires in 1908. He arrived in France at the age of 16 and trained in the jewellery industry with the Worms company as a trader in precious stones and pearls. The Worms brothers, founders of the company, were contacted by Mikimoto Kōkichi to market cultured pearls in France. They decided to second Fred Samuel to their customs operations in 1925.

After his national service at the age of 28, he set up his own business in 1936, opening a shop in his name in the eighth arrondissement of Paris, at number 6 Rue Royale. He chose to have printed in capital letters on his first business card: “Fred Samuel, the modern, jeweller, creator”; in French: Le Moderne-Joaillier-Créateur.

He was one of the first importers into France of the cultured pearl, a Japanese innovation that upset the French jewellery industry which had previously been devoted to fine pearls. The name of a particular shade of pearl, a light pinkish cream, dates from this period: the "Fred colour". His growing fame and creative daring for the time earned him recognition from Hollywood stars such as Mary Pickford, Douglas Fairbanks, Barbara Hutton and Marlene Dietrich.

As a citizen of Argentina, Samuel was ineligible to volunteer for the French army. Instead, in September 1939, he joined one of the Marching Regiments of Foreign Volunteers (French: Régiments de marche de volontaires étrangers, RMVE) set up by the French Foreign Legion, for foreign nationals or the stateless who wished to assist in France's defence in World War II. As a member of the 22nd Regiment of the RMVE, he saw heavy action during the Villers-Carbonnel offensive of the German Case Red campaign. At Marchélepot, one of the villages being defended in an attempt to secure the route to Paris, his regiment finally succumbed, after withstanding 48-hours of heavy aerial and artillery bombardment, followed by hand-to-hand combat once their ammunition ran out. Samuel was taken prisoner and sent to the citadel of Cambrai. However, on 6 June 1940, he managed to escape from the Germans and their zone interdite. Returning to Paris by September 1940, he resumed his shop on the Rue Royale in October 1940.

In December 1941, the shop was placed under the control of the Commissariat-General for Jewish Affairs, which affixed a yellow star to the shop front and forced the removal of the name Samuel from the sign. He then entrusted his shop to a friend, a "war nurse". In March 1942, he went to the zone libre, the southern "free" zone, before joining the French Forces of the Interior (FFI) in 1943. There, on 16 August 1944, he witnessed the arrival of the first of the Seventh United States Army's commandos of Operation Dragoon on the Marsanne plateau. He returned to Paris in September 1944 where he again took over his shop. In his autobiography, Memoirs of a jeweller (Mémoires d'un joaillier), Samuel explains why he kept only the first name Fred on his shop window: "[P]erhaps as a challenge, perhaps so as not to forget those monstrous hours, perhaps also to maintain the benefit of a healthy anonymity".

=== Development and diversification (1960–1990) ===
From the 1960s onwards, the company experienced sustained growth when Fred Samuel's sons, Henri and Jean, joined the business. Together they opened various boutiques in France, Monaco and the United States. They also decided to broaden the House's product range by opening the "6 Royale" in the 8th arrondissement of Paris in 1975, a boutique dedicated to the sale of leather goods and luxury accessories.

At that time and for many years, the company distributed watches including brands such as Piaget, Rolex, Baume & Mercier and Audemars Piguet.

In December 1962, Fred opened its first shop at Orly airport when the terminal opened.

The company built its reputation by collaborating with renowned artists: Jean Cocteau and Bernard Buffet for the creation of their own jewellery in 1962 and in 1971, and then with the organisation of an exhibition of Braque jewellery in 1972. For the opening of the Beverly Hills boutique in 1977, engraved plates by Picasso depicting "Ovid's Metamorphoses" were exhibited. Over the years, other artists have worked with the company, such as Miroslav Brozek, Arman and even Jean-Paul Goude.

The company also relied on precious stones to develop. In 1977, it acquired a 105.54-carat yellow diamond which it named the "Soleil d'Or", officially ranked 52nd among the world's largest cut diamonds. This diamond was unveiled on the 24th of November 1977 in the boutique at 6 Rue Royale in Paris during an exhibition entitled "Some of the World's Most Beautiful Diamonds", as part of De Beers' private collection of exceptional stones.

In 1981, it acquired the "Blue Moon", a 275-carat sapphire.

In 1987, at the occasion of the opening of a Fred space in the heart of Galeries Lafayette, the House presented the public with a collection of 50 diamonds of differing sizes and colours. In 1988, Fred acquired 42 coloured diamonds and created a first setting called "Arc-en-ciel". At that time, Fred Samuel was the first jeweller to make coloured diamonds his speciality.

The company inaugurated a boutique in Monaco in 1976, in the presence of Grace Kelly, and Fred became jeweller and supplier to the royal family.

During this period, the company signed orders for various dynasties around the world, such as the royal family of Nepal in the 1950s as well as Middle Eastern princes between 1970 and 1990.

Throughout these years, the company's reputation attracted French celebrities such as Maurice Chevalier, Sacha Guitry, as well as Catherine Deneuve, Régine, Alain Delon, Yves Montand and Johnny Hallyday.

=== From 1990 to the present day ===
In the 1990s, Fred became one of the world's top ten jewellers, with 12 shops from Paris to Beverly Hills, from New York and Houston, to Monte Carlo, Cannes and Geneva. It was also at this time that the House expanded into the Asian markets and opened its first boutique in Tokyo in 1994.

The company is associated with cinema by the signing of the diamond and ruby necklace worn by Julia Roberts in the 1990 film Pretty Woman, as well as the jewellery worn by Caterina Murino in Casino Royal in 2006.

In 1995, Fred Joaillier was acquired by the LVMH group and Dominique Watine-Arnault became the company's first female director.

In 2011, after having been the face of the brand in 2009 with Melvil Poupaud for a campaign, Kate Moss launched a jewellery collection inspired by her tattoos with the jeweller.

In 2015, Fred moved its main flagship to 14 Rue de la Paix in Paris after 15 years at number 7 Place Vendôme.

In June 2017, the company opened its first boutique in China in Shanghai.

In 2017, at the Viva Technology conference, the company unveiled "Atelier Fred", a digital tool that allows the "Force 10" bracelet to be customised by choosing colours, materials and precious stones. This innovation won three awards: the "Customer Experience Gold Medal" in the 2017 Marketing Excellence Award, the "Best Use of Technology" in the Grand Prix Stratégies and the "Connected Retailer Award 2017".

In 2018 the management was entrusted to Charles Leung, assisted by Valérie Samuel, vice-president and artistic director since 2017, granddaughter of the designer.

In 2018, the company's Tokyo shop moved to the Ginza District.

In 2022, the Maison launched the FRED Hero Cut, a 32-facet diamond cut that evokes both a sail and a shield, accompanied by the Force 10 Hero Cut bracelet.

In 2024, the jewelry house Fred unveiled its "Monsieur Fred Ideal Light" High Jewelry collection. This collection features transformable pieces that represent a synthesis of the brand's family heritage and contemporary aesthetic. The designs incorporate both precious gems and fine stones, notably spinels and garnets, which reference the Argentinian landscapes significant to founder Fred Samuel's early life. During the same calendar year, the company underwent an executive transition when Vincent Reynes assumed the position of Chief Executive Officer, replacing his predecessor Charles Leung in the leadership structure of Fred Jewelry. It was also announced that BTS' Jin would be Fred's first global ambassador.

== Main collections ==
- 1966: Birth of the first "Force 10" bracelet inspired by the world of sailing and its cables, launch of the collection in 1978 and marketing of an interchangeable bracelet in 2007.
- 1988: Launch of the "Force 10" eyewear collection.
- 2000: "Success" collection.
- 2011: “Pain de Sucre” collection and marketing of an interchangeable ring in 2013.
- 2012 - 2015: “Riviera” collections including: Baie des Anges, Belles Rives, Une Ile d’Or.
- 2016: “8°0” collection, launched for the 80th anniversary of the House, which becomes “Chance Infinie” in 2020.
- 2019: "Ombre Féline" collection from the 1960 archives, worn by Princess Grace of Monaco and relaunched for the reopening of the Fred boutique in Monaco.
- 2020: "Force 10 #GoBeyond" collection in support of the Special Olympics association.
- 2021: Reissue of the "Pretty Woman" collection, named after the appearance of the necklace in the film of the same name in 1990.

== Historical collections ==
=== Timepieces ===
- 1986: "1936" collection launched for the company's 50th anniversary.
- 1987: "Tigresse" collection.
- 1997: "Cut" collection.

=== Jewellery/High-Jewellery ===
- 1989: "Les Fredy's" collection, "Mini-Fredy's" in 1995 and collaboration with Jean-Paul Goude in 2009.
- 1996: "Mouvementé" collection.
- 2005: "Diamond Tag" collection from the 1970 archives.
- 2011: "Kate Moss for Fred" collection.
- 2022 : "Monsieur Fred Inner Light" collection.
- 2024 : "Monsieur Fred Ideal Light" collection.

=== Stones and designs ===
- 1977: "Soleil d’or", a yellow diamond of 105.54-carats.
- 1982: "Pretty Woman Necklace".
- 1984: "Sac Papillon", covered in black and white mother-of-pearl, set with brilliants and decorated with an engraved emerald.
- 1989: Coloured diamond brooch of which one is a heart cut diamond.
- 1991: "Broche Oiseau" brooch in diamonds and multi-coloured sapphires.

== Locations ==
In addition to Paris, where Fred Joaillier has several showrooms, notably on Rue de la Paix, the company also has some fifty boutiques: in France (Cannes, Lyon and Nice), in Monaco, in England (London), in China (Beijing, Shanghai, Hangzhou, Qingdao, Chengdu), in Japan (Tokyo, Kyoto, Osaka, Fukuoka), in South Korea (Seoul, Daegu, Busan), as well as in Hong Kong, Macao, Taiwan and Australia.

Fred is represented in several retail outlets in France as well as in Andorra, Australia, Bahrain, Belgium, China, Republic of the Congo-(Brazzaville), Ghana, Great Britain, Greece, Guadeloupe, French Guiana, Hong Kong, Italy, Ivory Coast, Japan, Luxembourg, Madagascar, Mauritius, Morocco, Portugal, Reunion Island, Russia, South Korea, Spain, Switzerland, Tunisia and the United States of America.
