= Marching Regiments of Foreign Volunteers =

Marching Regiments of Foreign Volunteers Régiments de marche de volontaires étrangers RMVE
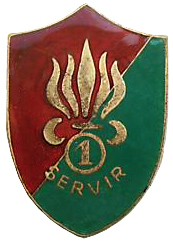
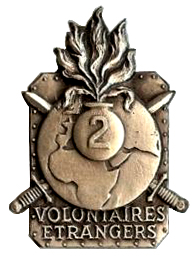
- Regimental Insignias of the 1^{er} RMVE & 2^{e} RMVE, 3^{e} RMVE which became the insignias of the 21^{e}, 22^{e}, 23^{e} RMVE
- Active: 1939 - 1940
- Country: France
- Allegiance: Foreign Legion
- Branch: French Army
- Type: Marching Regiment
- Motto(s): Servir; 1^{e} RMVE (To Serve); Volontaires Étranger; 2^{e} RMVE (Foreign Volunteers)
- Colors: Red and Green
- Anniversaries: Camerone (April 30)
- Engagements: World War II

Insignia
- Abbreviation: R.M.V.E

The Marching Regiments of Foreign Volunteers (French: Régiments de marche de volontaires étrangers, RMVE) were temporary formations of the Foreign Legion organized from Foreign volunteers during World War II. These regiments were formed on 16 September 1939:

On September 16, 1939, the war minister decided to form special corps of foreign volunteers part of the Foreign Legion. They were part of the Marching Regiments of Foreign Volunteers.

They were created at the corps of the Foreign Legion at Le Barcarès in October 1939 and May 1940. They recruited in principal from the Foreign Workers Companies (French: compagnie de travailleurs étrangers), essentially Spaniards from the Retirada, who represented 1/3 (one third) of formations, while the foreign Jews who enlisted voluntarily constituted 40% (forty percent) of formations. These regiments were not well equipped and other units referred to them by derision as "twine regiments" (French: Régiments de ficelles). The 21^{e}, 22^{e} and 23^{e} RMVE did not have an active central corps, nor did they have Legion reserve back-ups, not even "cadres" from Sidi bel-Abbès, only the exception of a couple of Legion Officers. To differentiate themselves, the traditional colors were inverted and were "Red & Green". Without Legion traditions, they fought and upheld nevertheless the same conviction. While not being well equipped, these three regiments as well as the 12th Foreign Infantry Regiment 12^{e} REI deserved the designation of "twine regiments", since they were the works of miracles at the gates of Paris, in Picardy, in the Ardennes and in Lorraine.

They achieved a mixed success, but like many units during the Fall of France were overwhelmed by the German blitzkrieg. Their regimental honors live on in the 2nd Foreign Infantry Regiment 2^{e} REI.

== 21st Marching Regiment of Foreign Volunteers - 21^{e} RMVE ==
- September 29, 1939: creation of the 1st Marching Regiment of Foreign Volunteers (1^{er} RMVE at Barcarès).
- February 25, 1940 : designated as 21st Marching Regiment of Foreign Volunteers 21^{e} RMVE
- July 1940 : dissolution

The 1st Marching Regiment of Foreign Volunteers 1^{er}RMVE was created at Barcarès in the Pyrénées-Orientales, in order to receive the foreign volunteers for the course of the war. The organization of the Marching Regiment included regimental units and three infantry battalions. On February 25, 1940, the 1^{er} RMVE was designated as 21st Marching Regiment of Foreign Volunteers (21^{e} RMVE). Strong with 2800 men, the regiment left Barcarès on April 30, in reinforcement of the Maginot Line. On May 25, the regiment was called for immediately, into the region of Verdun. Incorporated into the 35th Infantry Division, the regiment combat engaged during the night from June 8 to June 9. Despite exemplary resistances, the regiment had to unfold on Aire, in Argonne. Following a new combat engagement, while being heavily surrounded and tested with great force, the 21^{e} RMVE was retrieved from the front on June 14, only to be reorganized. With the armistice being signed, the regiment would no longer pursue combat. Put to the test harshly twice, having lost half of formations, the 21^{e} RMVE was dissolved in July 1940.

The insignia was created in 1939, by colonel Debuissy, first regimental commander of the 1^{er} RMVE, then the 21^{er} RMVE (October 1939 - June 1940). The 21^{e} RMVE has worn the insignia with the number « 1 » featured in the bomb of the grenade.

== 22nd Marching Regiment of Foreign Volunteers - 22^{e} RMVE ==
- October 24, 1939 : creation of the 2nd Marching Regiment of Foreign Volunteers 2^{e} RMVE. This Marching Regiment integrated the 19th Infantry Division (French: 19^{e} Division d'Infanterie)
- February 25, 1940 : designated as the 22nd Marching Regiment of Foreign Volunteers 22^{e} RMVE
- July 1940 : dissolution.

The 2nd Marching Regiment of Foreign Volunteers 2^{e} RMVE was created on October 24, 1939 at Barcarès in the Pyrénées-Orientales. The organization of the regiment consisted of three regimental formations and three infantry battalions. Ranks were filled with volunteers from forty seven nationalities. On February 25, 1940, the 2^{e} RMVE was designated as 22nd Marching Regiment of Foreign Volunteers (22^{e} RMVE). At the beginning of May, the regiment was in Alsace and on May 19, the regiment made way towards Somme south of Péronne, Somme. From May 22 to May 26, the regiment held his sector, regaining the apprehension of villages several times over again, in Fresnes-Mazancourt, Misery, Somme and Marchélepot, and also defended the route towards Paris, south of Péronne. Losses were heavy. These formations, composed of Spanish Republicans and Jews from Central Europe in majority, combat engaged with such a determination, that on June 5,6,7, while being completely surrounded at Villers-Carbonnel, near Péronne, and heavily bombarded by artillery and aviation, the regiment resisted during 48 hours to all the attacks. During the unfolding, the battalions succumbed one after the other, due to the depletion of ammunition, and while the men refused to surrender, they engaged this time in close corps-a-corps combat near de Marchelepot.

The insignia was created in 1940, by colonel Villiers-Moriamé, first regimental commander of the 2^{e} RMVE, then the 22^{e} RMVE (October 1939 - May 1940).

== 23rd Marching Regiment of Foreign Volunteers- 23^{e} RMVE ==
- May 1940 : creation of the 23rd Marching Regiment of Foreign Volunteers 23^{e} RMVE
- July 1 : dissolution

== History of the garrisons, campaigns and battles ==
Similarly to the previous world war, numerous foreign volunteers requested to serve in the ranks of the French Army.

To this effect, were created in October 1939, at camp Le Barcarès, in the Pyrénées-Orientales, the 21st and 22nd Marching Regiments of Foreign Volunteers. Their ranks were filled with the representation of 47 nationalities.

These two regiments were first deployed in Alsace in May 1940 then were directed in the Ardennes at the beginning of hostilities.

The 21st Marching Regiment of Foreign Volunteers 21^{e} RMVE was integrated into the 35th Infantry Division (French: 35^{e} Division d'Infanterie) and deployed south of the Ardennes. The regiment held his sector (all along the Marne–Rhine Canal (French: Canal de la Marne au Rhin)) for three consecutive weeks. During the unfolding of the regiment, the latter delivered combat against the German troops around the village of Sainte-Menehould.

The regiment illustrated capability in the sector of Buzancy, Ardennes - Le Mort-Homme on June 9 and 10 1940 then at the Grange au Bois.

The 22nd Marching Regiment of Foreign Volunteers 21^{e} RMVE combat engaged in the region of Péronne, Somme and notably on May 24, 1940 during the apprehension of Villers-Carbonnel which they had to finally abandon following the successive repeated assaults of German tanks.

The last of the regiments of foreign volunteers, the 23rd Marching Regiment of Foreign Volunteers - 23^{e} RMVE, formed in May 1940, was combat engaged south of Soissons on June 7, 1940 then on June 15 and 16 at Pont-sur-Yonne.

== Regimental Commanders ==
21^{e} RMVE

- Lieutenant-colonel Paul Debuissy.
- Lieutenant-colonel Albert Martyn.

22^{e} RMVE

- Lieutenant-colonel Villiers-Moriamé.
- Chef de bataillon (Commandant - Major) Hermann.

23^{e} RMVE

- Lieutenant-colonel Aumoitte.
- Lieutenant-colonel Maillet, Commandant of depot 21
- Commandant Herivaux, Rivesaltes
- Médecin-général Le Dentu, Director of the Health Service of the Camps (Rivesaltes, 24/7/1940)

== Fanions ==
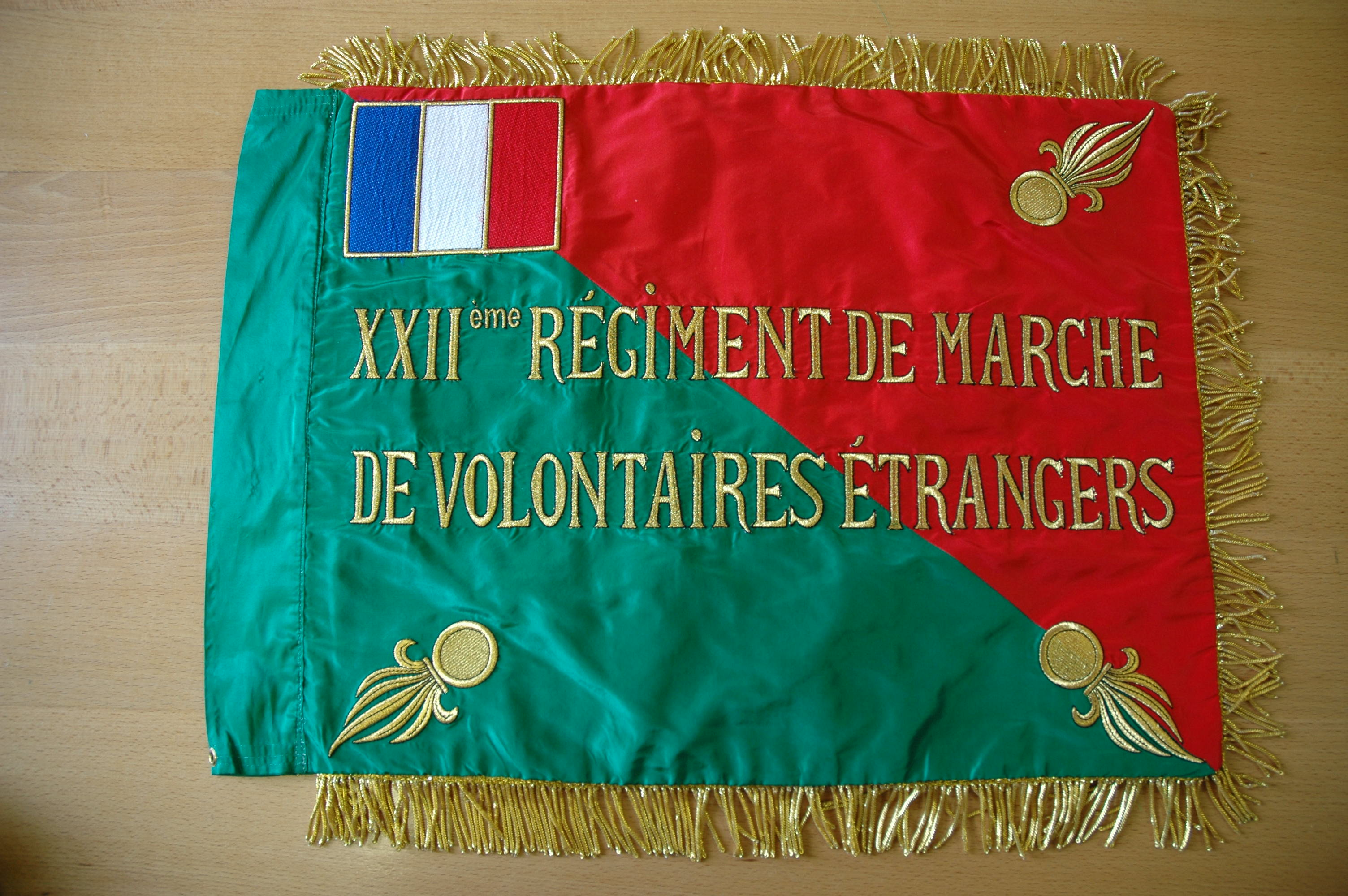
Fanion XXII^{e} RMVE

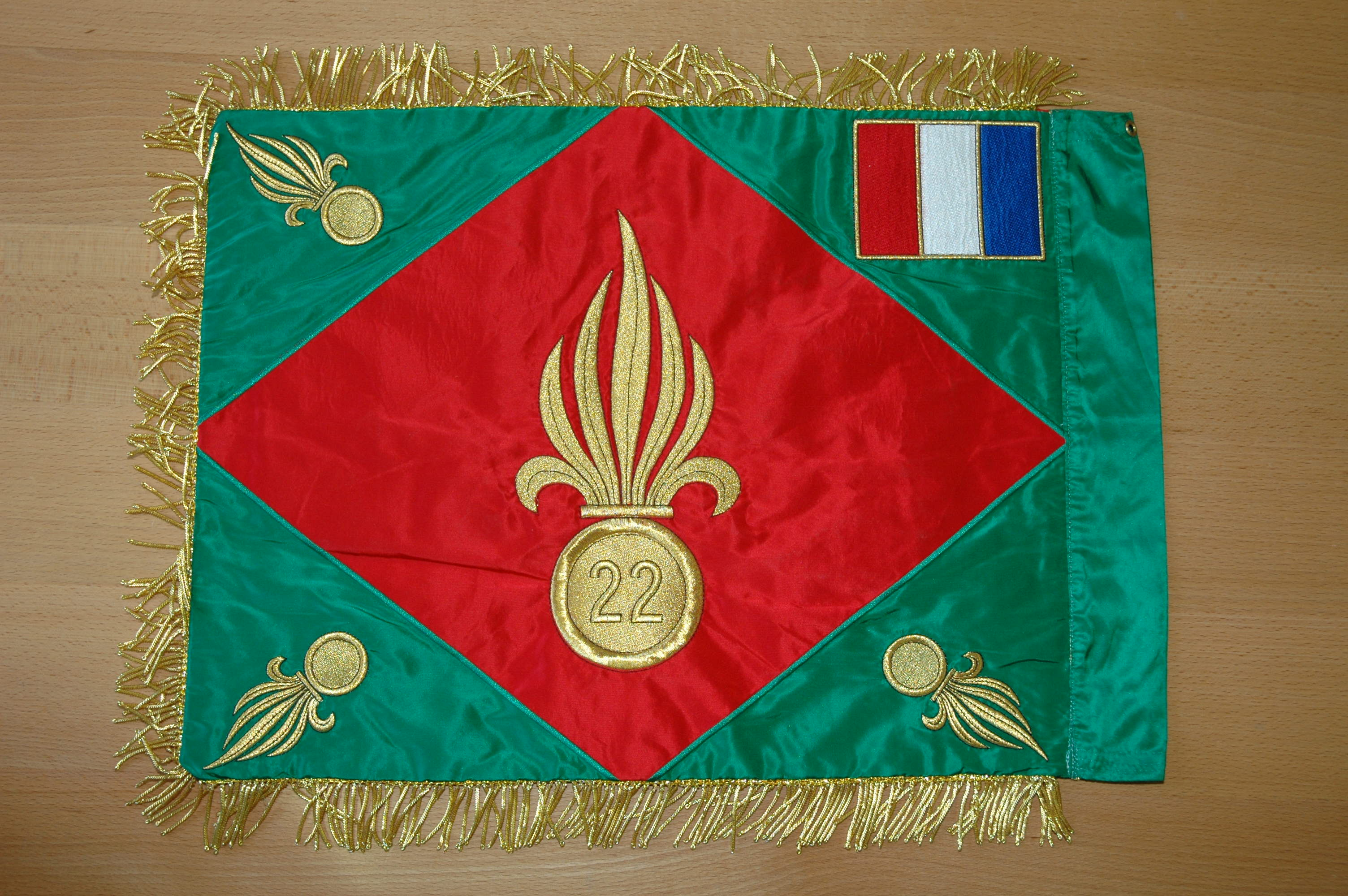
Fanion 22^{e} RMVE (verso)

== See also ==
- Marching Regiment of the Foreign Legion
