= 1st Spahi Regiment =

- 1^{e} Régiment de Spahis
- Regimental insignia of the 1st Spahi Regiment
- Active: 1914 – present: Régiment de marche de chasseurs indigènes à cheval R.M.C.I.C; Régiment de Marche de Spahis Marocains R.M.S.M; 21^{e} Régiment de Spahis Marocains 21^{e} R.S.M; 1^{er} Régiment de Spahis Marocains 1^{er} R.S.M; 1^{er} Régiment de Marche de Spahis Marocains 1^{er} R.M.S.M
- Country: France
- Branch: French Army
- Type: Cavalry, Light Infantry, Armor (current)
- Role: Armored Reconnaissance
- Part of: 6th Light Armoured Brigade
- Garrison/HQ: Valence, Drôme, France
- Mottos: "Faire Face"(Fr) "Facing Forward" (Eng)
- Mascot: A Ram
- Equipment: 48 AMX 10 RC, 90 VAB and 110 Trucks
- Engagements: World War I World War II; French Indochina War; Gulf War; War on terror (2001 - present)
- Battle honours: La Marne 1914; Pogradec 1917; Skumbi 1917; Bofnia 1918; Uskub 1918; Danube 1918; Levant 1920-1927; Erythrée 1941; El Alamein 1942; Tunisie 1943; Paris 1944; Strasbourg 1944; AFN 1952-1962; Koweit 1990-1991

The 1st Spahi Regiment (French: 1^{er} Régiment de Spahis) is an armored regiment of the modern French Army, previously called the 1st Moroccan Spahi Regiment (French: 1^{er} Régiment de Spahis Marocains). It was established in 1914 as a mounted cavalry unit recruited primarily from indigenous Moroccan horsemen. The regiment saw service in the First World War, and in the Second World War as part of the Forces Françaises Libres, as well as post-war service in the French-Indochina War and elsewhere. The modern regiment continues the traditions of all former Spahi regiments in the French Army of Africa.

== History ==
=== World War I ===
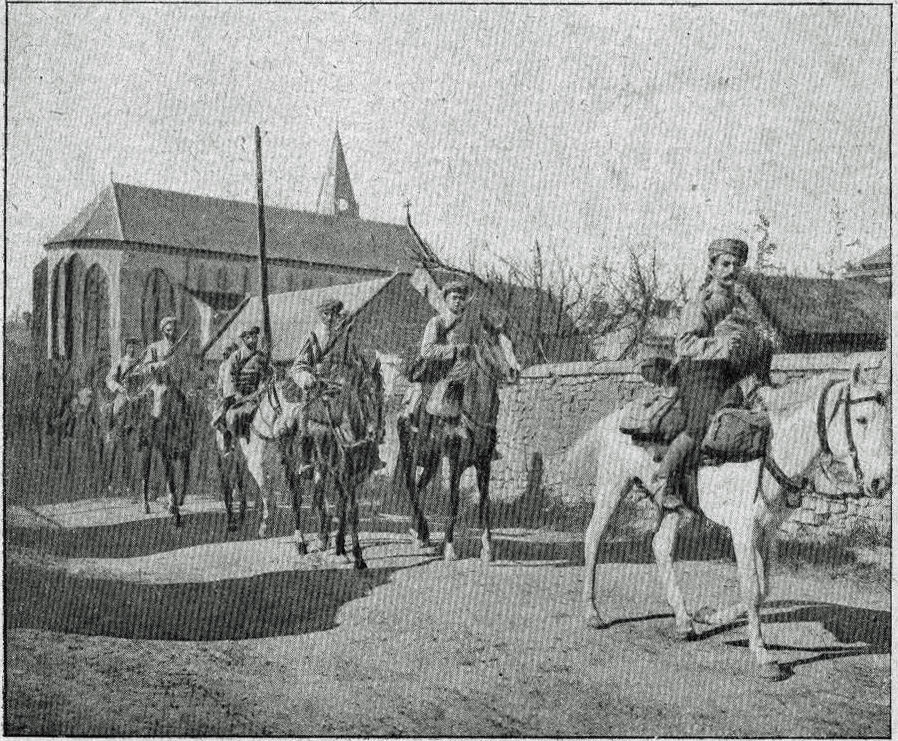
The 1st Moroccan Spahi Regiment, 1^{e} RSM in 1915.

The Moroccan Spahis of the French Army were created in 1914 by Général Hubert Lyautey. The initial title of the regiment was that of the Régiment de Marche de Chasseurs Indigènes à Cheval (R.M.C.I.C). The French Army had already raised four regiments of indigenous cavalry in both Algeria and Tunisia during the 19th century, and extended the designation of "spahis" to the Moroccan mounted units recruited after 1908.

The first Marching Moroccan Spahi Regiment (Régiment de Marche de Spahis Marocains, R.M.S.M) participated in the First Battle of the Marne. Subsequently, sent to the Orient Front, the regiment served with distinction at Pogradec, Skumbi, Bofnia, Uskub and on the Danube. The regiment was accordingly awarded 5 citations and a fourragere with the colors of the Médaille militaire.

=== Inter-war period ===
The regiment was redesignated as the 21st Moroccan Spahi Regiment (21^{e} Régiment de Spahis Marocains, 21^{e} R.S.M.) in 1921 and served in the campaigns in the Levant from 1920 to 1927. The regiment was awarded 3 additional citations plus a fourragere in the colors of the Croix de guerre des théâtres d'opérations extérieures. In 1929, the regiment was renamed as the 1st Moroccan Spahi Regiment (1^{er} Régiment de Spahis Marocains, 1^{er} R.S.M.).

=== World War II ===
On July 1, 1940, Captain Paul Jourdier, who commanded the 1st Squadron of the 1st Moroccan Spahi Regiment, decided to defect from the Vichy-led Army of the Levant and join the British forces in Palestine. While on maneuvers in southern Lebanon, Jourdier succeeded in detaching a small contingent comprising half of his squadron. The 1st RSM at this stage in the war was still a mounted cavalry unit, consisting of mostly North African Muslim troopers under French officers.

Reinforced by detached units that had separately crossed the border between Lebanon and Palestine, plus volunteers from London, the squadron undertook mounted operations in Eretria. The squadron conducted horse-mounted cavalry charges at Umbrega, still under the leadership of Captain Paul Jourdier. The defection of a regular cavalry unit of the Vichy forces was widely publicized by the British and Free French forces, making use of photographs showing charging spahis.

The regiment was subsequently dismounted and participated in the Syria–Lebanon Campaign on trucks, as part of the 1st Free French Brigade.

Other squadrons were created, forming first one then two army corps reconnaissance groups (GRCA), commanded by Jourdier and Robert de Kersauson.

Reinforced by a company of the 501e Régiment de chars de combat of the Free French Forces, the 2nd Group constituted the Free French Flying Column which participated in the Battle of El Alamein. It subsequently participated in the advance to Tunisia, initially as part of the British Eighth Army, then in 1943 in the FFF commanded by Général Philippe Leclerc de Hauteclocque.

On September 25, 1942, the two Groups were merged to form the 1st Moroccan Spahi Marching Regiment (French: 1^{er} Régiment de Marche de Spahis Marocains, 1^{er} R.M.S.M), under the command of Jean Rémy.

As a reconnaissance regiment of the 2nd Armored Division, the 1st RMSM participated in the Western Europe campaign of 1944-45, suffering heavy losses in both France and Germany.

The original (i.e. non-regiment de march) 1^{e} RSM saw mounted combat in Syria before being motorized in Morocco during 1943. The unit then took part in the battle of Royan, France in 1945. It was subsequently merged with the 8th Dragoon Regiment.

==== Decorations ====
The 1st Marching Moroccan Spahi Regiment (1^{er} RMSM) was awarded the distinction of Compagnon de la Libération by decree of August 7, 1945 and cited twice at the orders of the armed forces.

==== Regimental colors ====
Regimental colours

The Regimental Colors of the 1^{e} RMSM include in golden letters, the following inscriptions in the folds:

- Erytrhée 1941
- El-Alamein 1942
- Tunisie 1943
- Paris 1944
- Strasbourg 1944

Between 1944 and 1945, as part of the 2nd Armoured Division, the 1^{e} RMSM suffered the loss of 184 men out of whom 12.5% were Moroccan.

=== Post-war: 1945-62 ===
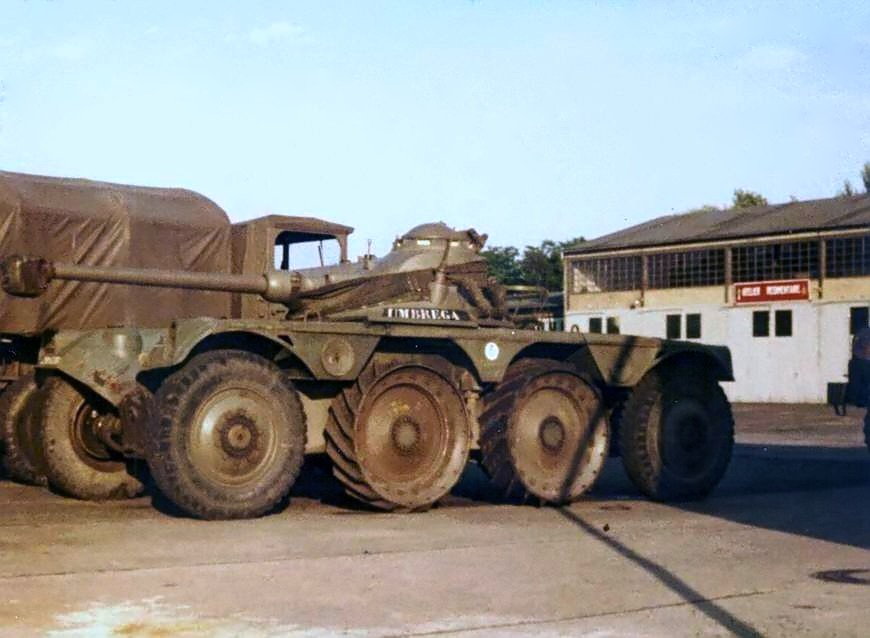
A reconnaissance armoured tank of the 1st Spahi Regiment in 1978.

One squadron of the 1st RSM served in the First Indochina War, between 1945 and October 1946.

During the post-war era the regiment underwent several changes in title, as well as being transferred between a number of different garrisons. In 1947, the regiment was designated as the 1st Regiment of Moroccan Spahis (French: 1^{er} Régiment de Spahis Marocains, 1^{er} RSM), a title it retained during its remaining service in Morocco.

In 1956 the 1st RSM was transferred to Algeria. The regiment was then re-designated as the 1st Regiment of Spahis (French: 1^{er} Régiment de Spahis, 1^{e} RS). In October 1958 its title was again changed to the 21st Regiment of Spahis (French: 21^{e} Régiment de Spahis, 21^{e} RS) - in order to avoid confusion with the 1st Regiment of Algerian Spahis (French: 1^{er} Régiment de Spahis Algériens, 1^{e} RSA).

=== The 1960s and Afterwards ===
The 1st Spahi Regiment continued in the French Army after the end of the Algerian War in 1962, although most of the other units of the former Armee d'Afrique were disbanded. Reportedly during a cabinet meeting, one of General Charles de Gaulle's ministers urged that the 1st RSM be retained in service because of its distinguished role in the Free French Forces during World War II. De Gaulle responded favourably, commenting: " On ne dissout pas un Compagnon de la Libération. " ("One does not dissolve a Companion of the Liberation").

In 1961, the regiment was transferred to Speyer in West Germany, as part of the French Forces in Germany. Its role was that of a reconnaissance regiment of the 2nd Army Corps.

In 1965, following the dissolution of the 1st Regiment of Algerian Spahis, the regiment was given its present-day title of the 1st Spahi Regiment (French: 1^{er} Régiment de Spahis, 1^{er} RS).

In 1984 the regiment was transferred from Germany and the FFA, to be incorporated in the 6th Light Armoured Division and garrisoned in Valence.

The regiment participated in Opération Daguet during 1991, as part of the French contingent in the Gulf War.

In 2009, the regiment left the 6th Light Armoured Brigade and joined the 1st Mechanized Brigade. On August 1, 2015, the regiment was reintegrated in the 6th Light Armoured Brigade.

The regiment's armored vehicle core consists of 48 AMX 10 RC, 90 VAB and 110 trucks. The regiment trains new recruits at headquarters; including armored vehicle crewmen and various mechanical trades as well as musicians and non-commissioned officers.

The most decorated unit of the modern Cavalry and Armoured Arm of the French Army, the regiment carries 14 battle honors on its colors.

== Organization ==
- Escadron de Commandement et de Logistique (ECL) – Command and Logistics Squadron
- Escadron d'administration et de soutien (EAS) - Administration & Support Squadron
- 1^{er} Escadron – 1st Squadron (4 combat troops)
- 2^{e} Escadron - 2nd Squadron (4 combat troops)
- 3^{e} Escadron - 3rd Squadron (3 combat troops)
- 4^{e} Escadron - 4th Squadron
- 5^{e} Escadron - (reserve)
- Escadron d'instruction - Instruction Squadron

== Traditions ==
=== Uniform and insignia ===
As mounted cavalry the North African personnel of the regiment wore high turbans, red jackets, wide blue-grey trousers and a white burnous (cloak). A dark blue over-cloak with hood was worn over the burnous, to distinguish the Moroccan spahis from their red-cloaked Algerian and Tunisian counterparts. After mechanization, features such as the double burnous/cloak and red sash of the historical Spahi uniform were retained and are still worn by the modern regiment on parade. A red forage cap of a model worn since the 1940s, is another present-day distinguishing feature.

The regimental insignia is a combination of the Cross of Lorraine with the Sharifian Pentagram from the Flag of Morocco.

=== Regimental colors ===
Regimental colors

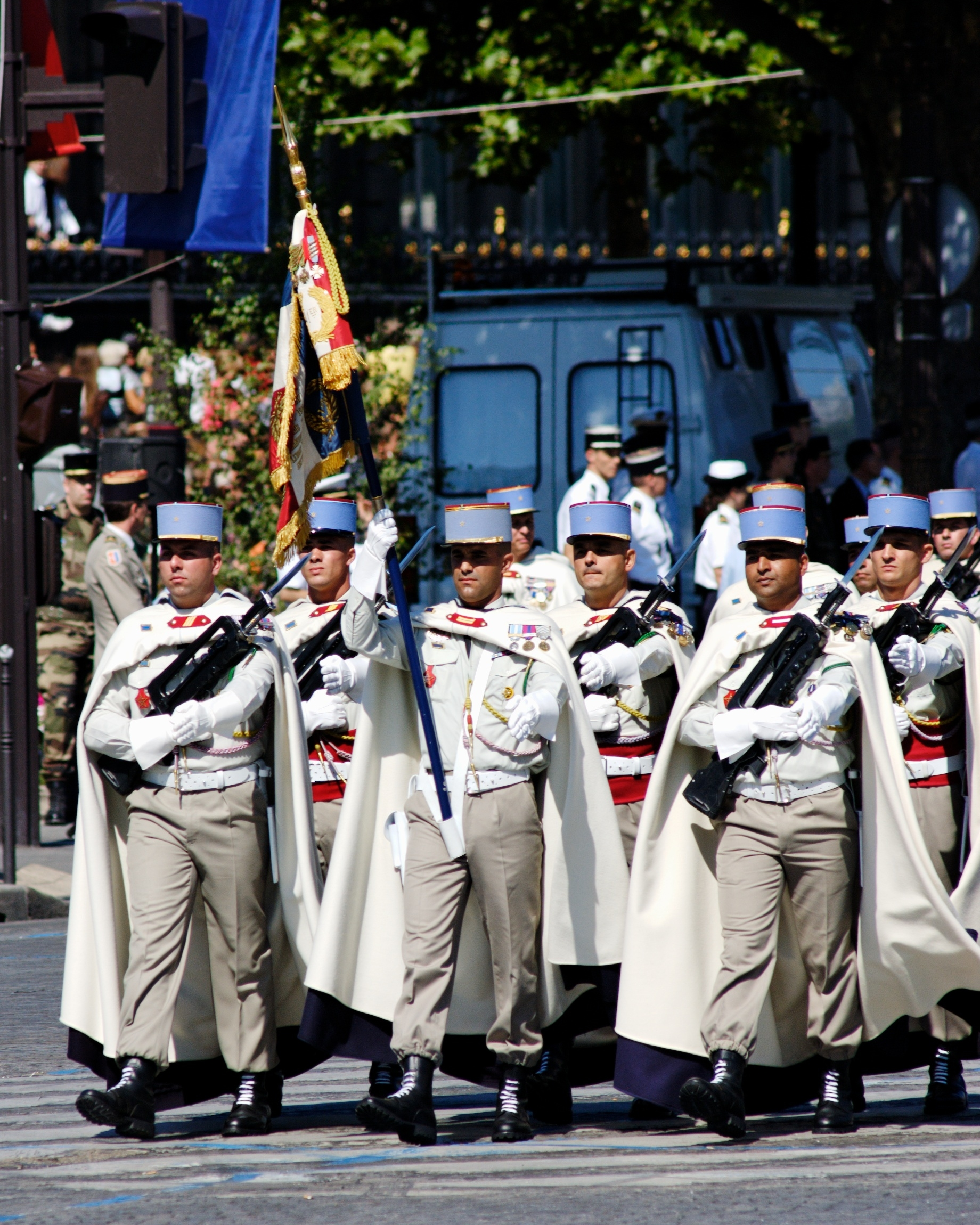
The 1st Spahis in the Bastille Day military parade of 2008.

=== Regimental song ===
Nous étions au fond de l’Afrique
Gardiens jaloux de nos couleurs
Quand, sous un soleil magnifique
Retentissait ce cri vainqueur :
En avant ! En avant ! En avant

C’est nous les Africains
Qui revenons de loin
Venant de nos pays
Pour sauver la Patrie
Nous avons tout quitté
Parents, gourbis, foyers,
Et nous gardons au cœur
Une invincible ardeur
Car nous voulons porter haut et fier,
Le beau drapeau de notre France entière,
Et si quelqu’un venait à y toucher,
Nous serions là pour mourir à ses pieds.
Battez tambours, à nos amours
Pour le Pays, pour la Patrie,
Mourir au loin, c’est nous les Africains.

Pour le salut de notre Empire
Nous combattons tous les vautours
La faim, la mort nous font sourire
Quand nous luttons pour nos amours.
En avant ! En avant ! En avant !

De tous les horizons de France
Groupés sur le sol africain
Nous venons pour la délivrance
Qui, par nous se fera demain
En avant ! En avant ! En avant !

Et lorsque finira la guerre
Nous reviendrons à nos gourbis
Le cœur joyeux et l’âme fière
D’avoir libéré le Pays
En criant, en chantant, en avant !

=== Decorations ===
The Regimental Colors of the 1st Spahi Regiment is decorated with:

- Croix de la Libération
  (historically linked to the 1^{er} R.M.S.M)
- Croix de guerre 1914-1918 with:
  - 5 palms
    (historically linked to the 1^{er} R.M.S.M)
- Croix de guerre 1939-1945 with:
  - 2 palms
    (historically linked to the 1^{er} R.M.S.M)
- Croix de guerre des théâtres d'opérations extérieures with :
  - 4 palms
    (historically linked to the 1^{er} R.M.S.M)
- Croix de la Valeur militaire with :
  - 1 bronze star (awarded May 8, 2014)
- Mérite Militaire Chérifien - Military Sharifian Medal
  (historically linked to the 1^{er} R.S.M)
- Médaille de la bravoure Serbe - Medal of Serbian Bravery
  (historically linked to the 1^{er} R.S.M)
- Ordre Serbe de Kara-Georges de 4^{e} rang, avec glaives - Serbian Order of Kara-Georges 4th order
  (historically linked to the 1^{er} R.S.M)
- Croix de Guerre Serbe avec une citation à l'ordre de l'Armée Ordre Roumain de Saint Michel - Serbian Croix de Guerre with citation at the orders Romanian Order Army of Saint-Michael
  (historically linked to the 1^{er} R.S.M)
- American U.S. Presidential Unit Citation
- Fourragere with:
  - colors of the Médaille militaire, with olives of the Croix de guerre 1914-1918 and Croix de guerre 1939-1945
  - colors of the Croix de guerre des théâtres d'opérations extérieures
  - colors of the Croix de la Libération since June 18, 1996
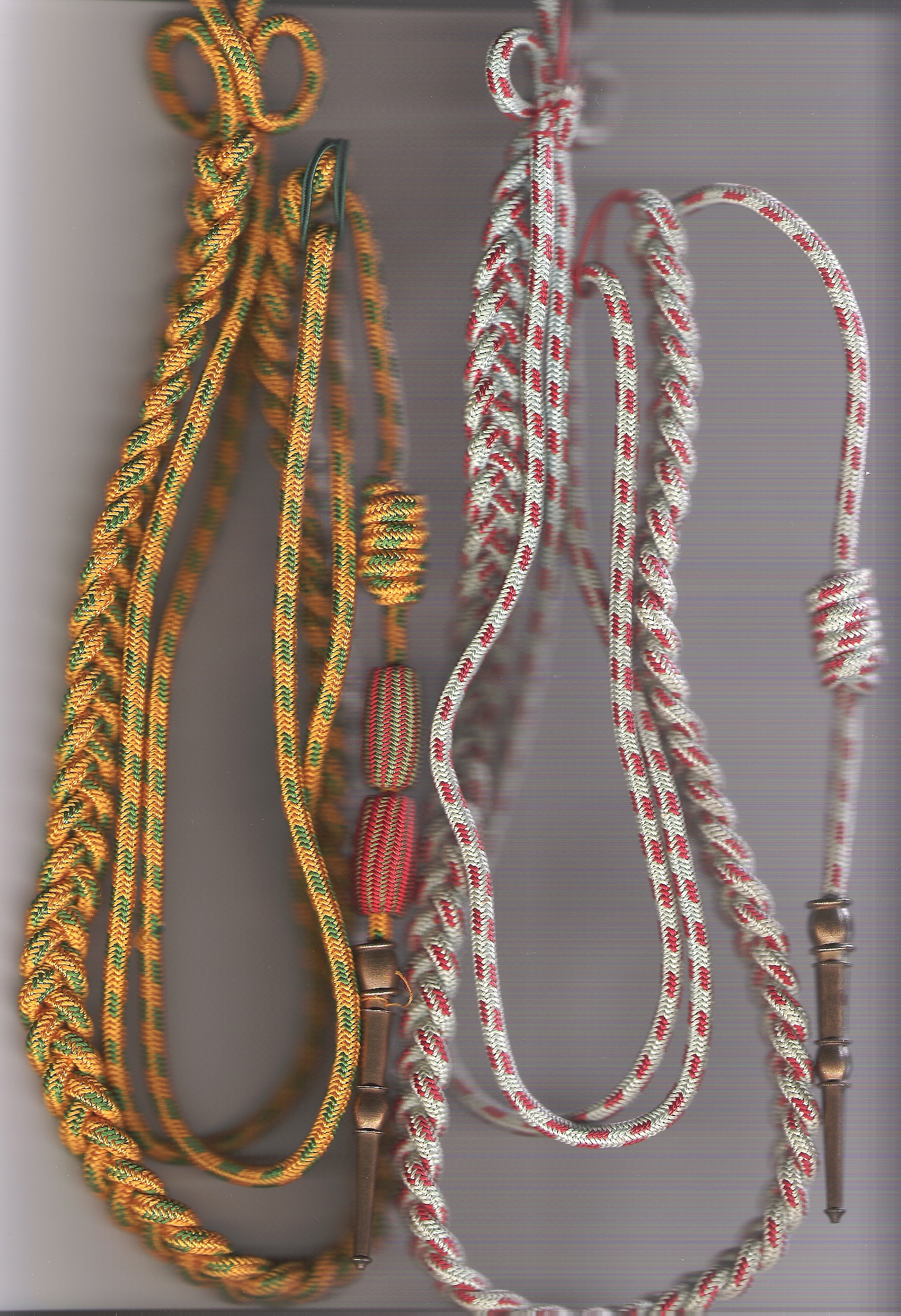
Fourragere with colors of the Médaille militaire, with olives of the Croix de guerre 1914-1918, Croix de guerre 1939-1945 and Fourragere with colors of the Croix de guerre des théâtres d'opérations extérieures

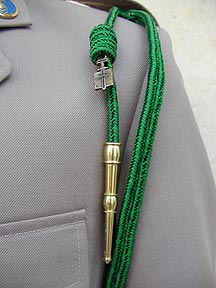
Fourragere with colors of the Croix de la Libération since June 18, 1996

U.S. Presidential Unit Citation

=== Battle honours ===
- La Marne 1914
- Pogradec 1917
- Skumbi 1917
- Bofnia 1918
- Uskub 1918
- Danube 1918
- Levant 1920-1927
- Erythrée 1941
- El Alamein 1942
- Tunisie 1943
- Paris 1944
- Strasbourg 1944
- AFN 1952-1962
- Koweit 1990-1991

== Regimental Commanders ==
- 1914-1918 : colonel Gustave Albert Dupertuis
- 1918-1919 : colonel Guespereau
- 1919-1928 : colonel Massiet
- 1928-1932 : colonel Holtz
- 1932-1934 : colonel Langlois
- 1934-1939 : colonel Bastien
- 1939-1940 : colonel Trémeau

1^{er} RSM from 1940 to 1945

- 1940-1941 : lieutenant-colonel de Chaléon
- 1940-1941 : colonel Martin
- 1943-1945 : colonel Michon

1^{er} RMSM from 1940 to 1945

- 1940-1942 : Chef d'escadrons Jourdier (Compagnon de la Libération)
- 1942-1942 : Chef d'escadron de Kersauson
- 1942-1945 : colonel Rémy (Compagnon de la Libération)
- 1945–present
- 1945-1948 : lieutenant-colonel Deville (Compagnon de la Libération)
- 1948-1952 : colonel de Lannoy
- 1952-1954 : colonel Fauchon-Villeplée
- 1954-1956 : lieutenant-colonel Le Vacher
- 1956-1958 : lieutenant-colonel Bonnot
- 1958-1960 : lieutenant-colonel Berthet
- 1960-1961 : lieutenant-colonel Nodet
- 1961-1963 : lieutenant-colonel Calvel
- 1963-1965 : lieutenant-colonel Saint-Olive
- 1965-1967 : lieutenant-colonel Guillot
- 1967-1968 : lieutenant-colonel Dumont Saint-Priest
- 1968-1969 : lieutenant-colonel Arnaud
- 1969-1971 : lieutenant-colonel de La Pomarède
- 1971-1973 : colonel Woisard
- 1973-1975 : lieutenant-colonel Perrin
- 1975-1977 : colonel Combourieu
- 1977-1979 : colonel de Bressy de Guast
- 1979-1981 : colonel Mommessin
- 1981-1983 : colonel Simon
- 1983-1985 : lieutenant-colonel Grenaudier
- 1985-1987 : colonel Garreau
- 1987-1989 : colonel Fourniol
- 1989-1991 : colonel Barro
- 1991-1993 : colonel de Courtivron
- 1993-1995 : colonel Beaulieu
- 1995-1997 : colonel Ract-Madoux
- 1997-1999 : colonel Moné
- 1999-2001 : colonel Boulnois
- 2001-2003 : colonel Mercier
- 2003-2005 : colonel Duhesme
- 2005-2007 : colonel Faure
- 2007-2009 : colonel de Sériège
- 2009-2011 : colonel de La Grand'Rive
- 2011-2013 : colonel Giraud
- 2013-2015 : colonel Pinon
- 2015-2017 : colonel Do Tran
- 2017-2019 : colonel Héon
- 2019-2021 : colonel Daviet
- 2021-2023 : colonel Marçais
- 2023-2025 : colonel Maurin
- 2025- : colonel Laudet

== 1st Spahi Regiment - Gallery ==
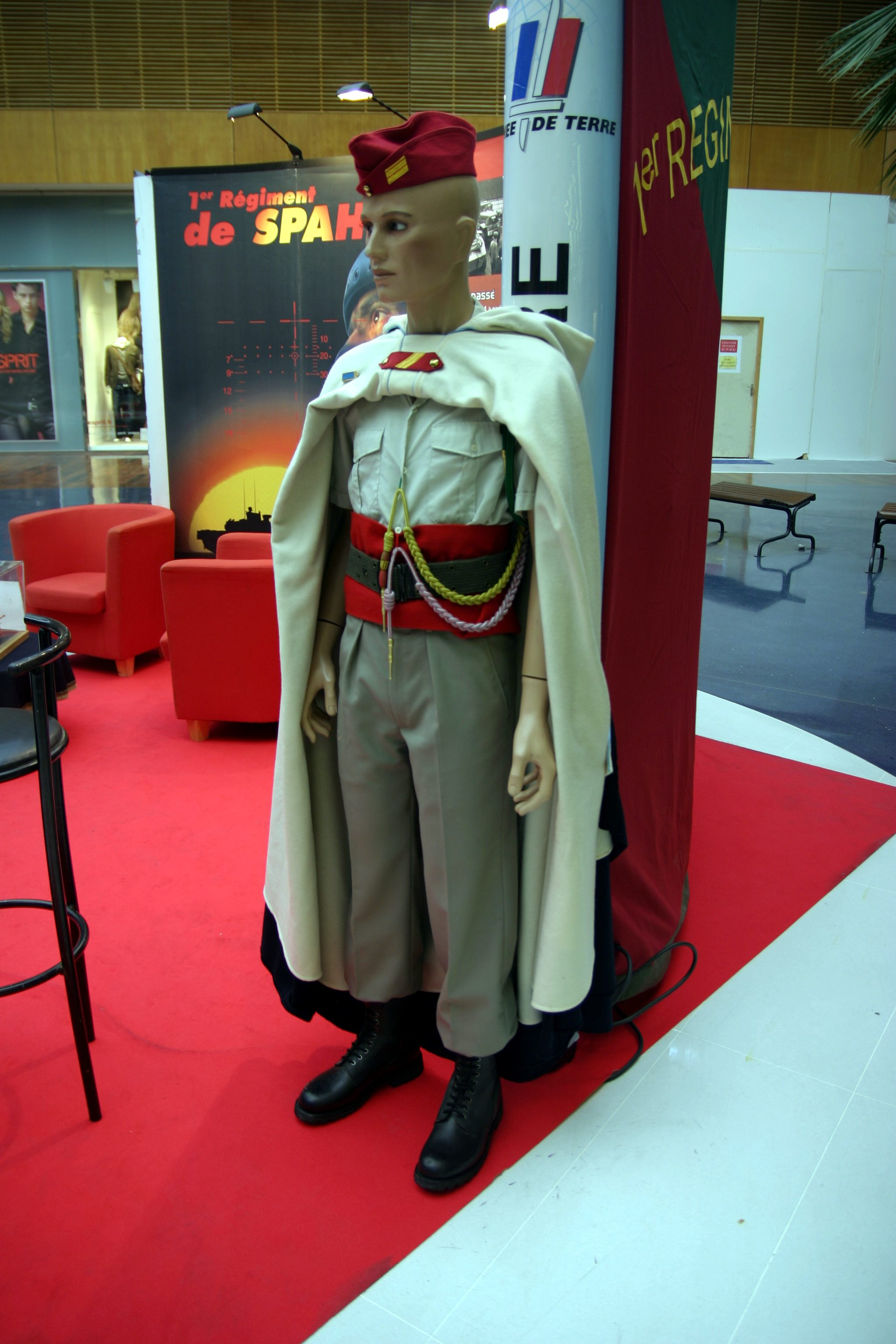
Traditional Uniform of the 1st Spahi Regiment.

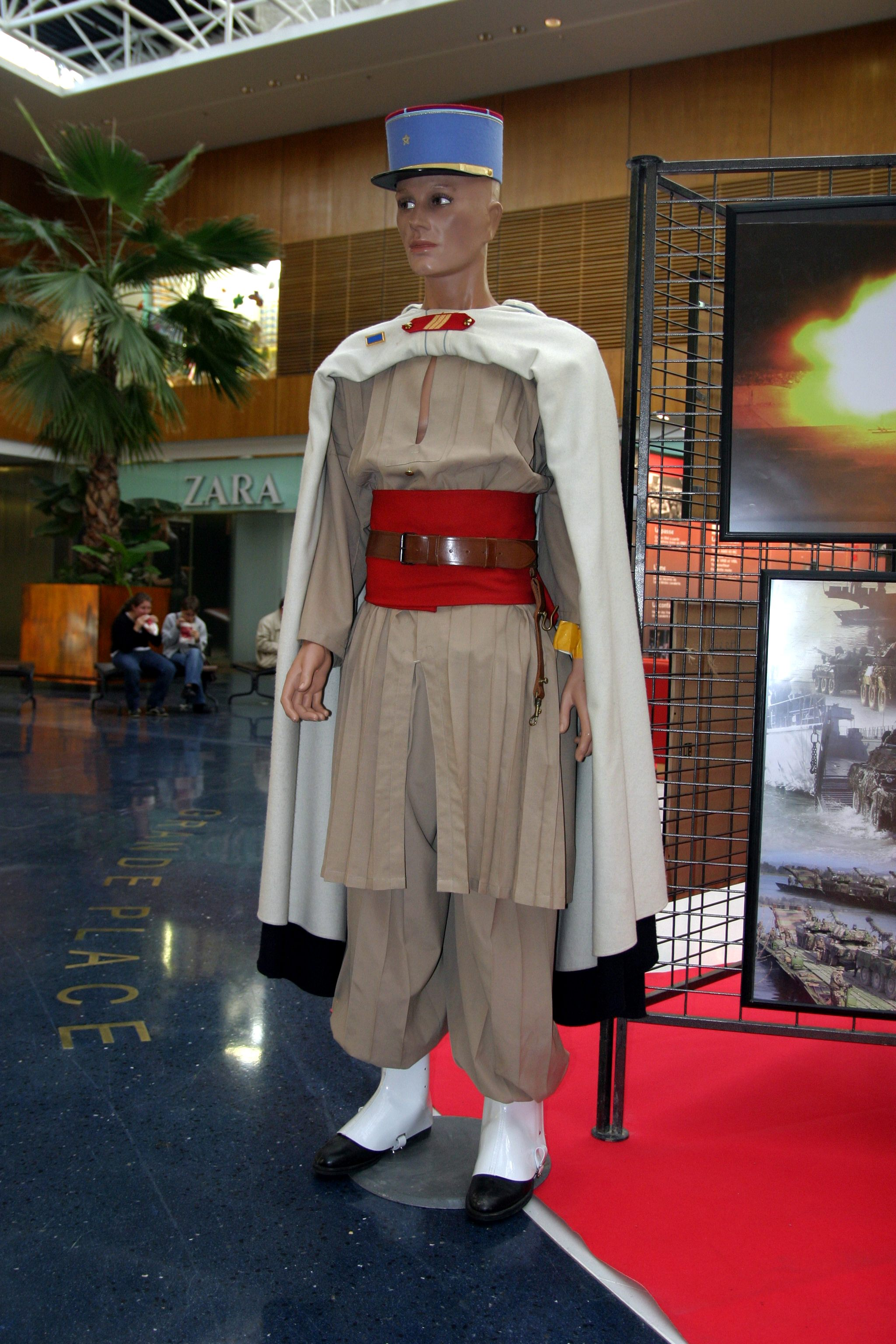
Traditional Uniform of Spahis.

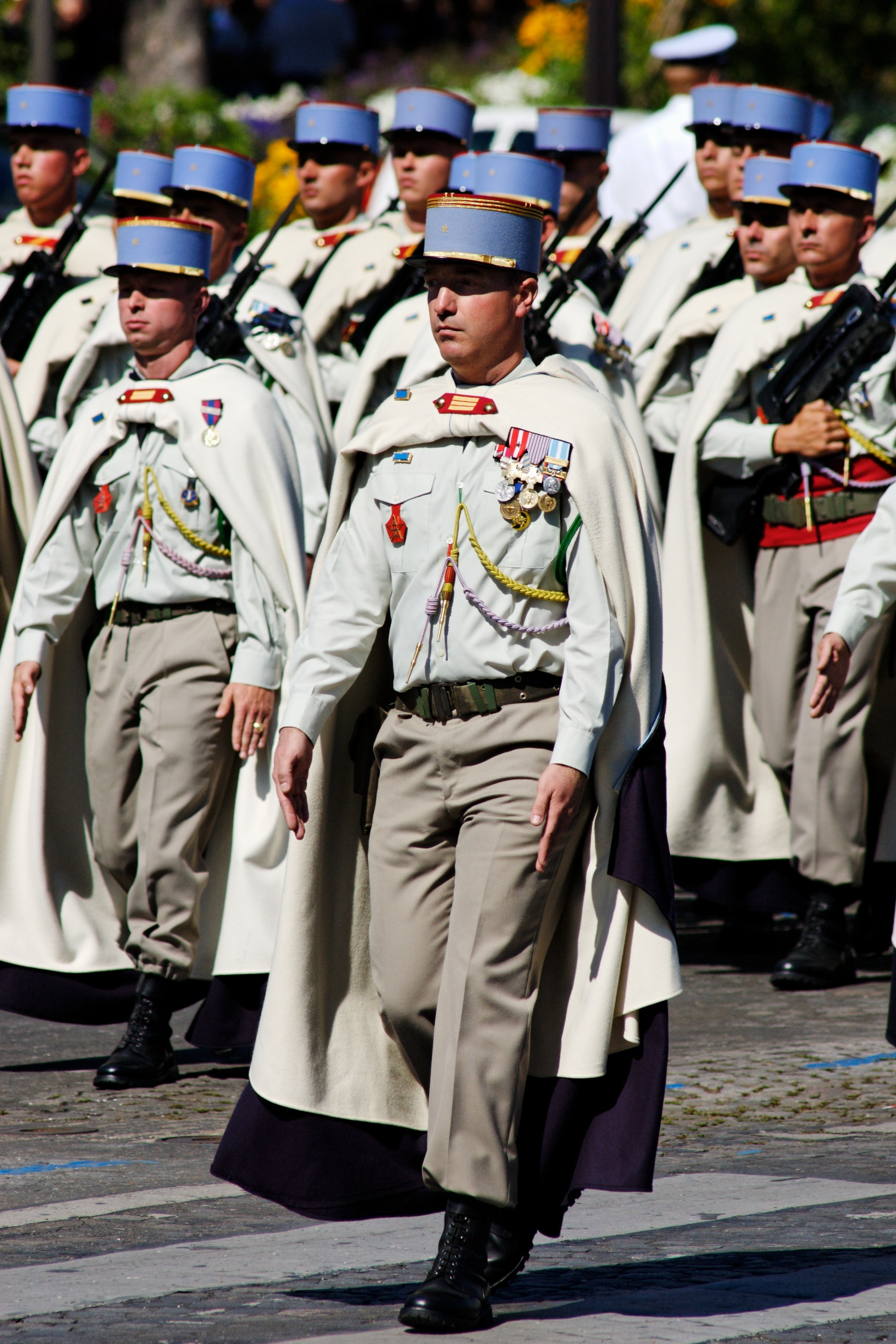
1st Spahi Regiment during a parade in 2008.

== See also ==
- Jean de Lattre de Tassigny
