= 22nd Marching Regiment of Foreign Volunteers =

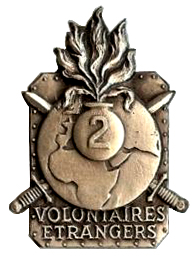
- Regimental Insignia of the 22^{e} RMVE
- Active: 1939–1940
- Country: France
- Allegiance: French Foreign Legion
- Branch: (France) French Army
- Type: Marching Regiment
- Mottos: Volontaires Étranger (Foreign Volunteers)
- Engagements: World War II: Battle of France

The 22nd Marching Regiment of Foreign Volunteers (French: 22^{e} Régiment de marche de volontaires étranger, 22^{e} RMVE) was a regiment of the French Foreign Legion formed from expatriates living in France at the outbreak of World War II. While established as a different unit, its veterans are recognized as part of the Foreign Legion. The 22nd RMVE resisted the German invasion of France in 1940, seeing major action along the Somme during the month of June.

== History ==
On September 16, 1939, the government of Édouard Daladier established Foreign Workers Companies (French: compagnie de travailleurs étrangers) which were not part of the French Foreign Legion. These formations were called Régiments de marche de volontaires étrangers. The 22nd RMVE was composed largely of Spanish Republicans who had fled to France after Francisco Franco's victory in the Spanish Civil War. The unit trained at Bacarès before being deployed to Alsace on May 6, 1940. On May 10, the 22nd RMVE was attached to the 19th Infantry Division, under the command of General Toussaint. On May 19 the 22nd RMVE departed its positions near Altkirch and traveled by rail to Boran-sur-Oise, arriving May 21.

During the regiment's deployment along the Weygand Line, Gen. Toussaint grew increasingly dissatisfied with the unit's commander, Lieutenant Colonel Pierre Villiers-Moriame, a reserve officer who he believed to be incompetent. On May 25 the 22nd RMVE was ordered to retake the village of Villers-Carbonnel but failed to dislodge the German troops from the town. Following this failure Gen. Toussaint demanded that the 22nd RMVE be replaced by a French regiment, or that all of its senior officers be replaced. The commander of the 1st Army Corps, Major General Sciard, had no units with which to replace the regiment, and responded by sacking the units commanders - along with Toussaint himself. Command of the 22nd RMVE was given to Major Paul Hermann, a regular army officer formerly of the 41st Infantry Regiment. Command of the 19th Division was given to Gen. Fernand Lenclud, formerly of the 11th Infantry Division.

On June 5-6, the regiment defended the villages of Fresnes-Mazancourt, Misery, and Marchélepot. In Fresnes, the 6th Company under Lieutenant Rigal held out through 25 hours of continuous combat, the men surrendering only after they had exhausted their ammunition. Major Hermann was captured and taken prisoner. Captain Guy Pascier de Franclieu, commander of the regiment's 3rd Battalion, held out for another 3 hours, again ordering a surrender only when ammunition was exhausted. Capt. de Franclieu was wounded during this action. Gen. Lenclud and his staff officers praised the regiment for "very fine conduct and steadiness under fire." During this battle, the 22nd RMVE suffered a casualty rate of nearly 70%, including 5 officers killed and 21 wounded.

== See also ==
- 2nd Foreign Infantry Regiment
- Marching Regiments of Foreign Volunteers
