= 21e Régiment de marche de volontaires étrangers =

Unit of the French Foreign Legion

21st Marching Regiment of Foreign Volunteers
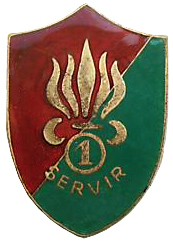
- Regimental Insignia of the 21^{e} RMVE
- Active: 1939 to 1940
- Country: France
- Allegiance: French Foreign Legion
- Branch: (France) French Army
- Type: Marching Regiment
- Motto: Servir (To Serve)
- Engagements: Battle of France

The 21st Marching Regiment of Foreign Volunteers (French: 21^{e} Régiment de marche de volontaires étranger, 21^{e} RMVE) was a formation of the French Foreign Legion from 1939 to June 26, 1940.

== History ==
In order to serve France, foreign volunteers formed the regiment in 1939.

== See also ==
- 2nd Foreign Infantry Regiment
- Marching Regiments of Foreign Volunteers
