= 23rd Marching Regiment of Foreign Volunteers =

- Active: 1940
- Country: France
- Branch: French Army
- Type: Marching Regiment
- Engagements: World War II: Battle of France

The 23rd Marching Regiment of Foreign Volunteers (French: 23^{e} Régiment de marche de volontaires étranger, 23^{e} RMVE) was a regiment of the Foreign Legion which existed briefly during World War II.

== History ==
The regiment was formed in May 1940.

== See also ==
- 2nd Foreign Infantry Regiment
- Marching Regiments of Foreign Volunteers
