= Fanion =

French military flag

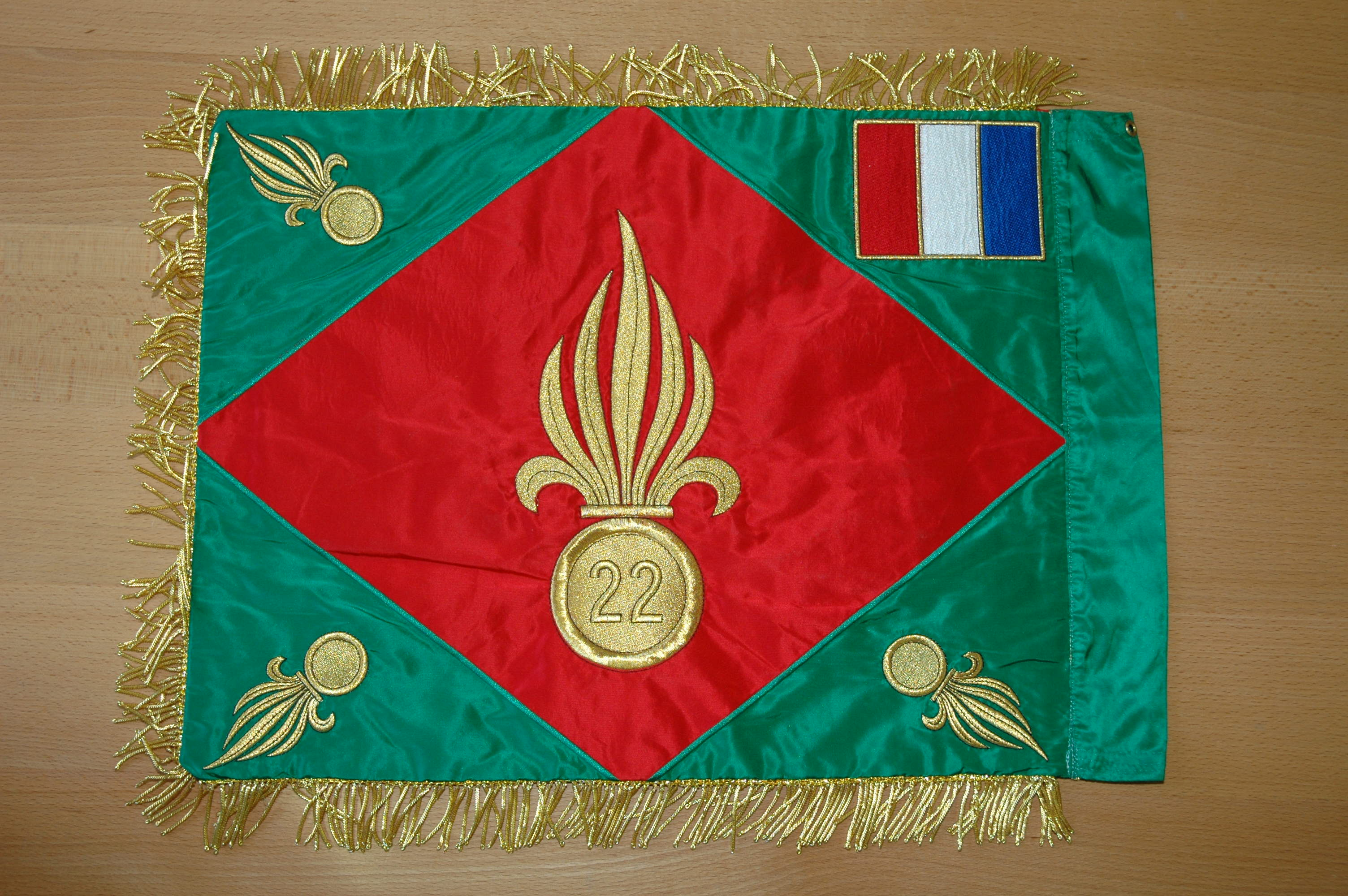
Fanion of the French 22nd Marching Regiment of Foreign Volunteers

A fanion is a small flag used by the French military, equivalent to an American guidon or British company colour. The name derives from the Italian word gonfanone, or gonfanon. They were often attached to a small staff which was placed in the muzzle of a rifle.

The regulation sizes were 50 cm × 40 cm for a battalion fanion, 40 × 30 for a company fanion, and 34 × 27 for a platoon fanion (the latter can also be a triangular pennant 30 × 40).

== See also ==
- Colours, standards and guidons
