= Marchélepot-Misery =

- Commune
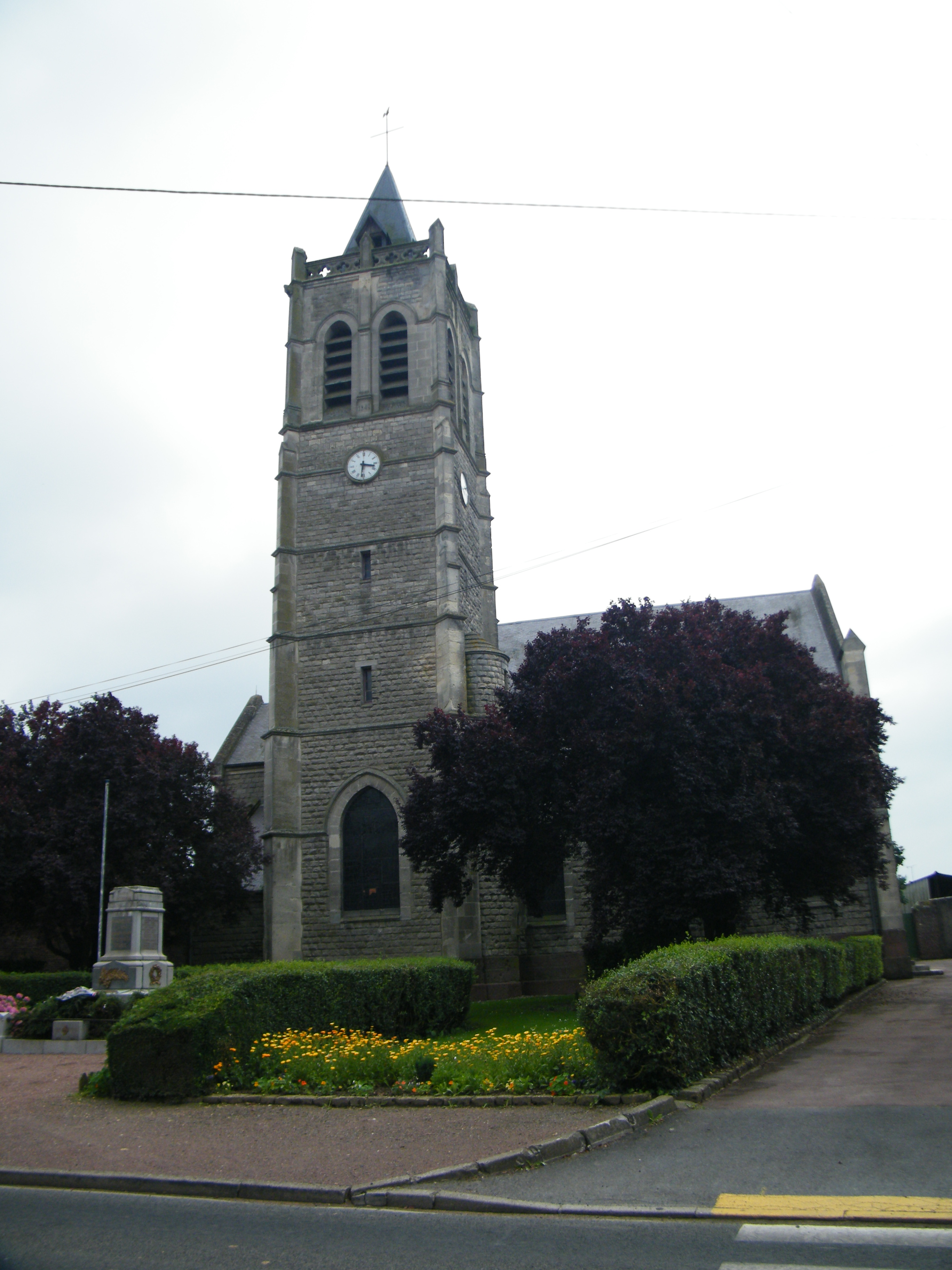
- The church in Marchélepot
- Location of Marchélepot-Misery
- Location within France Location within Hauts-de-France
- Coordinates: 49°50′07″N 2°52′01″E
- Country: France
- Region: Hauts-de-France
- Department: Somme
- Arrondissement: Péronne
- Canton: Ham
- Intercommunality: CC Terre de Picardie

Government
  - Mayor (2020–2026): Didier Potel
- Area^{1}: 8.55 km^{2} (3.30 sq mi)
- Highest elevation: 104 m (341 ft)
- Lowest elevation: 55 m (180 ft)
- Population (2023): 575
  - Density: 67.3/km^{2} (174/sq mi)
- Time zone: UTC+01:00 (CET)
  - Summer (DST): UTC+02:00 (CEST)
- INSEE/Postal code: 80509 /80200
- ^{1} French Land Register data, which excludes lakes, ponds, glaciers > 1 km^{2} (0.386 sq mi or 247 acres) and river estuaries.

Marchélepot-Misery (French pronunciation: [maʁʃelpo mizʁi]) is a commune in the Somme department in Hauts-de-France in northern France. It was established on 1 January 2019 by merger of the former communes of Marchélepot (the seat) and Misery.

== See also ==
- Communes of the Somme department
