= Jean Rémy =

French colonel

Jean Stanislas Rémy, commonly known as Jean Rémy, (Paris, October 3, 1899 – Toulouse, August 15, 1955) was a French colonel, a member of the Free French, and a Companion of the Liberation.

== Biography ==
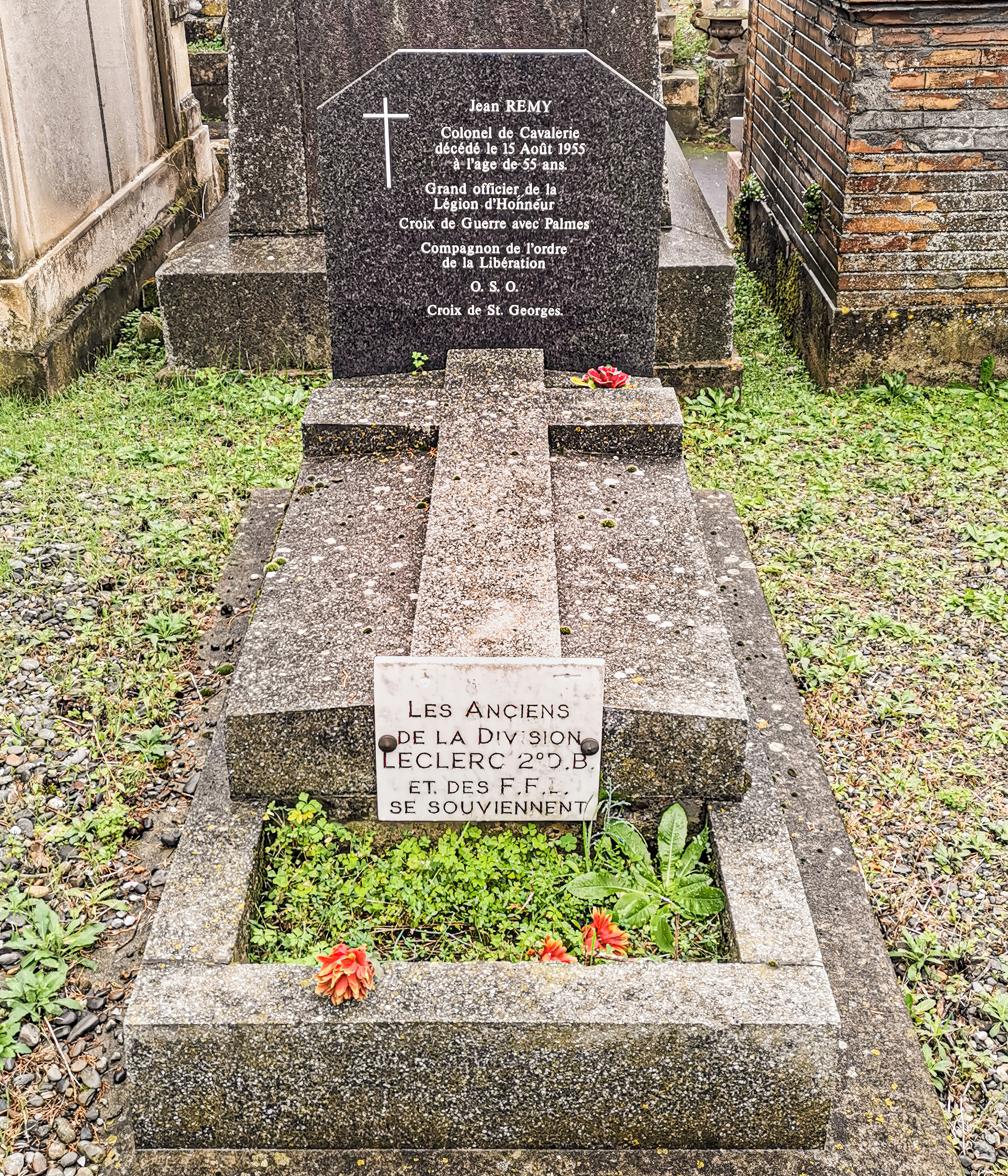
Tombe of Jean Rémy

Rémy joined the Russian Army during World War I at the age of 17. He subsequently joined the French Army in 1919. He remained in the Army of the Orient as a non-commissioned officer until 1924 when he was sent to the Saumur Officer School.

In 1925 he became a second lieutenant and was sent to Tunisia, then part of France. He served a few years in France and then went to the Levant where he took part in peace-keeping operations.

Rémy was promoted to captain in 1937 and stayed in Syria until 1941. On 18 June 1940, General Charles de Gaulle made his Appeal of 18 June and "invites the officers and the French soldiers who are located in British territory or who would come there to put themselves in contact with [him]". In July 1941, Rémy joined de Gaulle and the Free French. He became Chef d'Etat-major (Chairman of the Joint Chiefs of Staff) for Syria.

On September 25, 1942, he organized and took command of the 1er Régiment de Marche de Spahis Marocains (RMSM), not to be confused with the 1er Régiment de Spahis Marocains (RSM, First Regiment of Moroccan Spahis), who were loyal to Marshal Philippe Pétain. The 1st RMSM fought in the French Free actions in Northern Africa, notably at El Alamein and near Médenine in Tunisia. Rémy's forces were organized for reconnaissance as British "Flying Columns". This Flying Column was constituted of 314 men and was equipped with – notably - 24 armored cars and 14 tanks.

Rémy then organised the integration of the 1st RMSM into General Leclerc's 2nd Armored Division (2e DB). He was promoted to colonel and joined the 1st RMSM London during April–May 1944. As part of the 2e DB, he fought in the Battle of Normandy and then marched on Paris. He was wounded in Normandy and once more at Fort Mont-Valérien. On August 25, 1944 the 1st RMSM liberated Versailles.

His wartime service continued until the war ended for the 1st RMSM at Adolf Hitler's Berghof in Berchtesgaden.

In 1944, he was made a Companion of the Liberation and on August 7, 1945, the 1st RMSM was also awarded the same title.

After World War II, Rémy was sent to Oran where he fulfilled various tasks for the French Army. In 1951-1952 he was commandant for Algerian armored forces and cavalry. In 1952, he returned to France, in Toulouse with the same responsibilities for the local military region.

He died at Larrey Hospital in Toulouse, of complications caused by his war injuries. A street in Toulouse has been named in his honor.

== Decorations ==
- Grand Officier of the Légion d'Honneur
- Companion of the Liberation
- Croix de guerre 1939-1945 (9 mentions)
- Distinguished Service Order
