= Misery, Somme =

Misery
- Part of Marchélepot-Misery
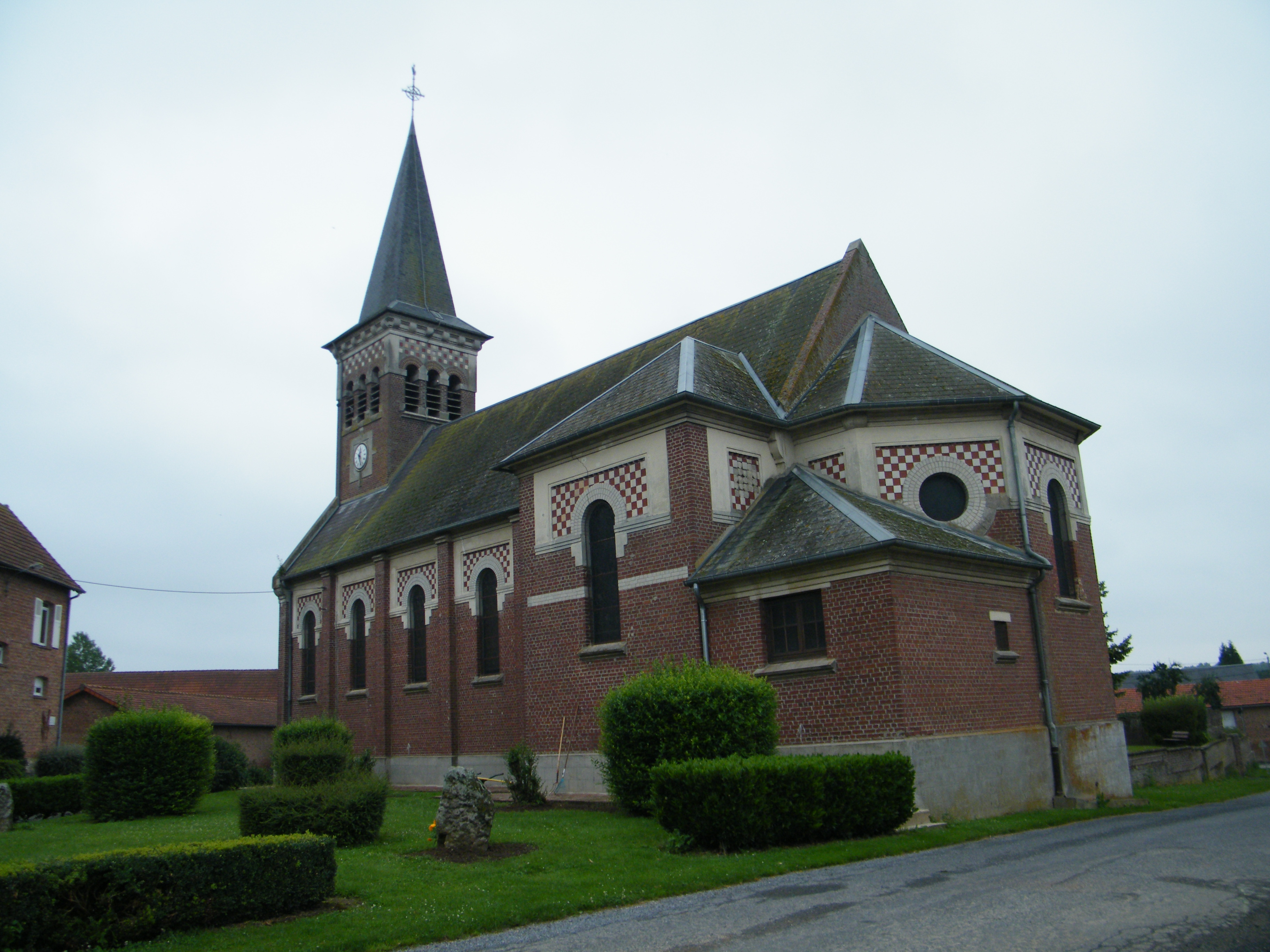
- The church in Misery
- Location of Misery
- Location within France Location within Hauts-de-France
- Coordinates: 49°50′58″N 2°53′14″E
- Country: France
- Region: Hauts-de-France
- Department: Somme
- Arrondissement: Péronne
- Canton: Ham
- Commune: Marchélepot-Misery
- Area^{1}: 3.28 km^{2} (1.27 sq mi)
- Elevation: 71 m (233 ft)
- Highest elevation: 102 m (335 ft)
- Lowest elevation: 55 m (180 ft)
- Population (2022): 128
  - Density: 39.0/km^{2} (101/sq mi)
- Time zone: UTC+01:00 (CET)
  - Summer (DST): UTC+02:00 (CEST)
- Postal code: 80320
- ^{1} French Land Register data, which excludes lakes, ponds, glaciers > 1 km^{2} (0.386 sq mi or 247 acres) and river estuaries.

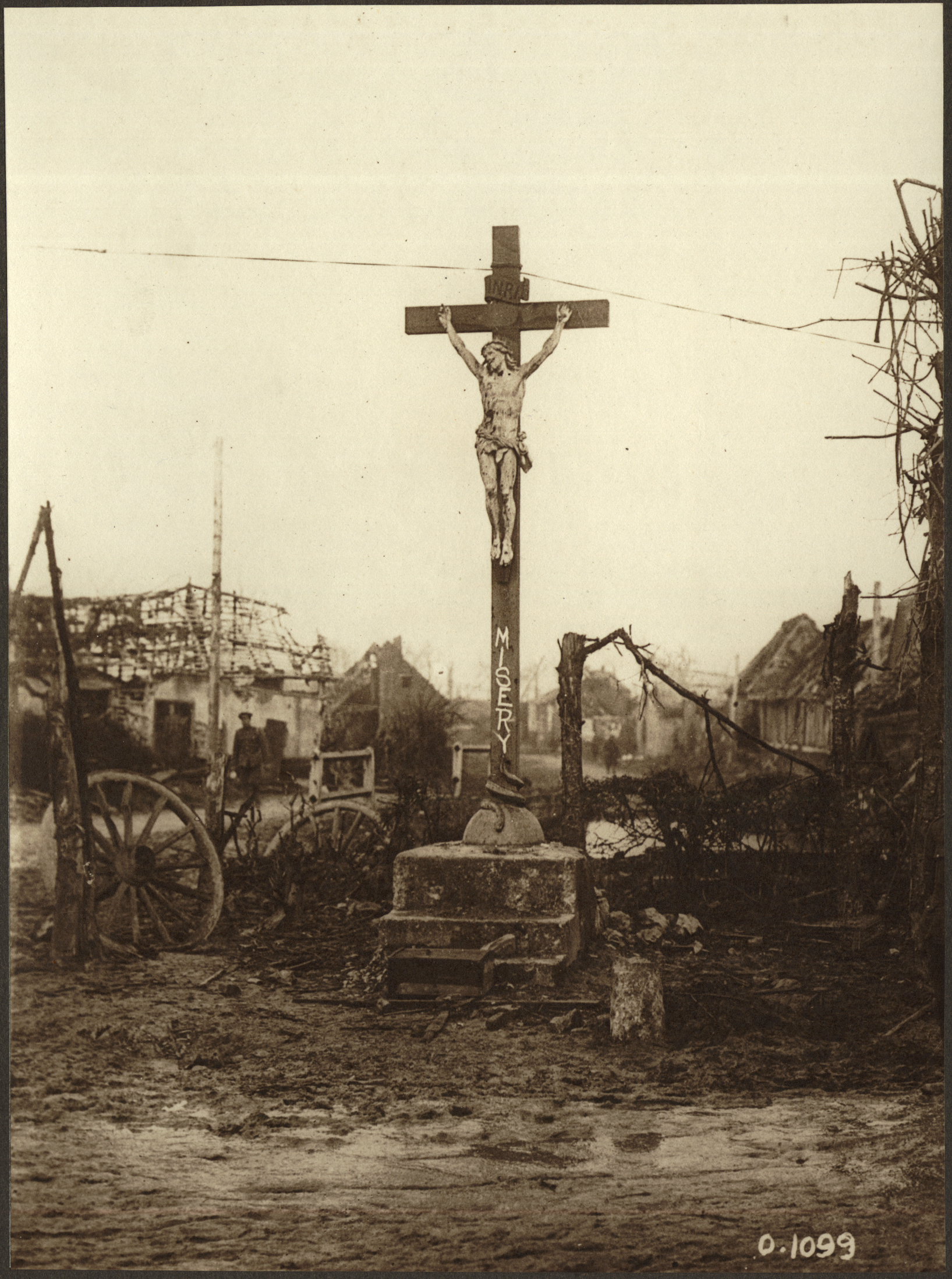
A crucifix left standing in the town of Misery during the First World War, March, 1917

Misery (French pronunciation: [mizʁi]) is a former commune in the Somme department in Hauts-de-France in northern France. On 1 January 2019, it was merged into the new commune Marchélepot-Misery.

== Geography ==
Misery is situated on the D35e road, some 30 miles (48 km) east of Amiens.

== Population ==
Historical population
| Year | Pop. | ±% p.a. |
|---|---|---|
| 1962 | 141 | — |
| 1968 | 104 | −4.95% |
| 1975 | 86 | −2.68% |
| 1982 | 94 | +1.28% |
| 1990 | 124 | +3.52% |
| 1999 | 103 | −2.04% |
| 2006 | 126 | +2.92% |
Source: EHESS

== See also ==
- Communes of the Somme department
