= Marchélepot =

Commune in Somme, France

- Part of Marchélepot-Misery
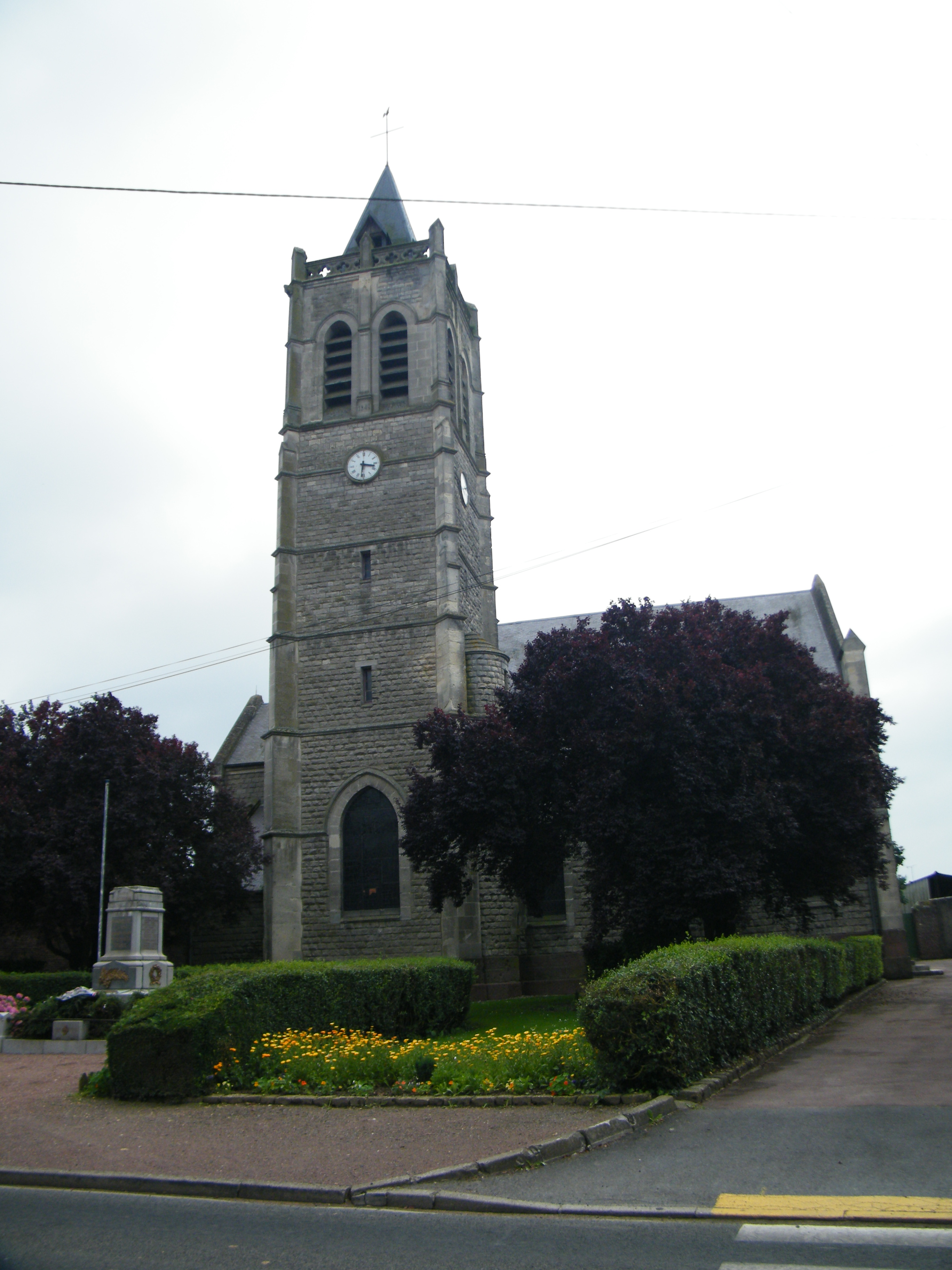
- The church in Marchèlepot
- Location of Marchélepot
- Location within France Location within Hauts-de-France
- Coordinates: 49°50′07″N 2°52′01″E
- Country: France
- Region: Hauts-de-France
- Department: Somme
- Arrondissement: Péronne
- Canton: Ham
- Commune: Marchélepot-Misery
- Area^{1}: 5.27 km^{2} (2.03 sq mi)
- Elevation: 84 m (276 ft)
- Highest elevation: 104 m (341 ft)
- Lowest elevation: 67 m (220 ft)
- Population (2023): 448
  - Density: 85.0/km^{2} (220/sq mi)
- Time zone: UTC+01:00 (CET)
  - Summer (DST): UTC+02:00 (CEST)
- Postal code: 80200
- ^{1} French Land Register data, which excludes lakes, ponds, glaciers > 1 km^{2} (0.386 sq mi or 247 acres) and river estuaries.

Marchélepot (French pronunciation: [maʁʃelpo]) is a former commune in the Somme department in Hauts-de-France in northern France. On 1 January 2019, it was merged into the new commune Marchélepot-Misery.

== Geography ==
The commune is situated on the N17 road, some 30 miles (48 km) east of Amiens.

== See also ==
- Communes of the Somme department
