= Marching regiment =

French temporary regiment

A regiment de marche (roughly 'marching regiment' in English) is a French temporary (provisional not permanent), regiment created for a specific campaign or other military purpose.

Clayton describes a "bataillon de marche" as comprising the 'fit trained personnel' of all the battalions from a two to three battalion regiment. This creation of a provisional unit may be undertaken because of manpower shortages on mobilisation if new drafts of conscripts and volunteers had not yet arrived. As a terminology, this is similar to the "(Service) Battalion" designation in use in the British Army in 1914-15 onwards. Such battalions were for war service only, having a temporary nature, like that of the fr:Bataillon de marche concept of the French Army.

Marching battalions may also be created from:

- units which have become disorganized, by drafting soldiers from depots, garrisons or discharged from hospitals; or from contingents of new recruits not yet formed into regular units or from reservists;
- foreign contingents and Troupes coloniales.

Other designations used are marching battalions (French: Bataillons de Marche) or Marching Squadrons (French: Escadrons de Marche), or marching brigades comprising several regiments.

== History ==
The concept of marching units was used throughout the 19th and 20th centuries in the French Army and its associated military systems.

Under the First French Empire, the designation of Provisional Regiment was used to identify a regiment created by levies from different regular units, or from garrison troops. In the 20th century however only the term regiment de marche continued to be used.

== Early Unites de marche of the French Army ==
The first marching regiments appeared during the Napoleonic Wars. The Spanish War (French: guerre d'Espagne) saw heavy casualties amongst the regular French units involved and in 1808 Napoleon I authorised the creation of marching regiments to replace these losses.

Napoleon I designated "provisional regiments" for specific assignments as well as "marching regiments" intended for deployment outside France. These ad hoc units might also be used to bring metropolitan garrisons up to strength.

It was in 1812, during the Russian Campaign (French: campagne de Russie), that the concept of marching regiments became general.

As examples:

- On 29 February 1812, a provisionary regiment (later redesigned as a marching regiment) of hussarss (French: Hussards) was formed in Toulouse and at Foix from the 1st, 2nd, 3rd, 4th and 10th Hussar Regiments;
- On 8 May 1812 the 1st Marching Regiment of Paris was created. It was deployed towards Erfurt (French: Erfurt) and subsequently Berlin (French: Berlin) where the regiment was dissolved on 16 June;
- On 28 May 1812, a Cavalry Marching Regiment of 1000 men was raised, recruited from the depots of the French Army in Spain. Brought together in Bayonne (French: Bayonne) the new units was deployed in Russia;
- On 2 September 1812, Napoleon ordered a column to be created consisting of the "Infantry Marching Regiment of the 3rd Corps", the Cavalry Marching Regiment', the 5th Marching Cavalry, and the 6th Marching Cavalry. It participated in the Battle of Borodino (French: bataille de la Moskova).

During the retreat from Moscow, marching regiments were constituted to bring back scattered detachments from fragmented corps to their respective units of origin.

=== Spanish expedition and siege of Algiers ===
During the Spanish Expedition (French: expédition d'Espagne) in April 1823, a number of depot units were sent to Spain under the designation of Provisionary Regiments

Later, during the expedition of 1830 and the siege of Algiers (French: prise d'Alger), Marching Regiments were created and embarked. Général Étienne Alexandre Bardin (French: Étienne Alexandre Bardin) explained in his Dictionary of the French Army that these marching regiments were used because the under strength light infantry units could only provide two formed battalions of veteran chasseurs.

During this period, opinions differed in respect of the effectiveness of employing marching regiments. The administrator Pierre Agathange Audier recommended the practice in his "Study course of military administration" published in 1824. However, Général Étienne Alexandre Bardin expressed the contrary view that "If in the course of a major war and during distant operations we are forced to resort to this method of reinforcing the army, the practice is administratively deplorable".

=== Overseas and foreign campaigns of the Second French Empire ===
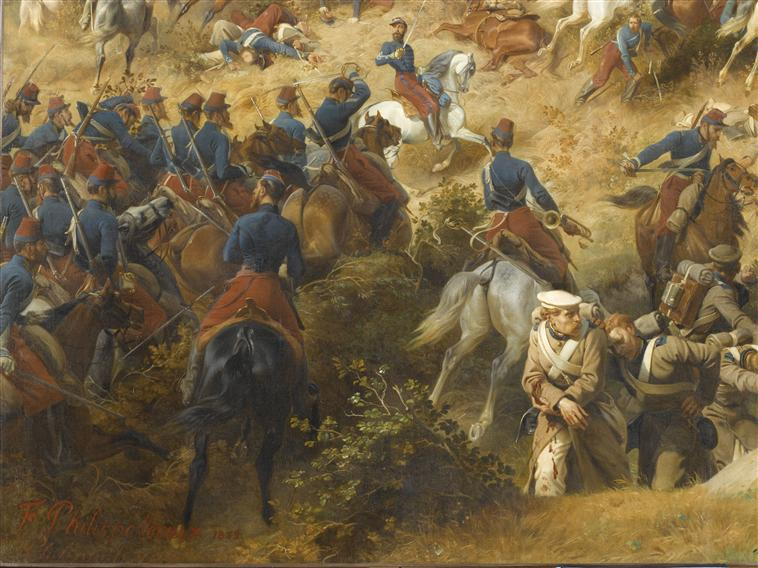
French Chasseurs d'Afrique during the Battle of Balaclava (French: bataille de Balaklava) in 1854.

Expeditions undertaken in Algeria, Russia, Mexico and Italy during the Second French Empire made use of marching regiments.

=== Crimean War ===
Marching regiments drawn from units of the French Army of Africa were engaged from 1854 to 1856 in the Crimean War.

=== French intervention in Mexico ===
The French expeditionary corps which disembarked in Mexico (French: Mexique) on 8 January 1862 consisted initially of the 1st Marching Regiment plus 2,000 men of the 1st Marine Infantry Regiment (1^{er}RIMa) and the 2nd Marine Infantry Regiment (2^{e} RIMa).

The same year, reinforcements were received from the 2nd Marching Cavalry Regiment (Lieutenant-Colonel Jean-Auguste Margueritte), which was composed of two squadrons drawn from the 12th Chasseurs à Cheval Regiment plus two squadrons taken from the 3rd African Chasseurs Regiment.

=== Franco-German war of 1870 ===
The disaster of the Franco-Prussian War (French: Guerre franco-allemande de 1870) led the French to create in urgency numerous marching regiments.

==== End of the Second French Empire ====
The 13th Army Corps (French: 13^{e} Corps d'Armée) (général Vinoy (French: général Vinoy) was formed in August 1870 at Paris. The Marching Regiments of this corps were constituted of three depot battalions belonging to different regiments with recruits or recalled veteran soldiers.

- The 5th Marching Regiment (French: 5^{e} de Marche) (colonel Hanrion) and the 6th Marching Regiment (French: 6^{e} de Marche) (lieutenant-colonel du Guiny) with two marching chasseurs companies formed the 1st Brigade of général Mattat. The 7th Marching Regiment (French: 7^{e} de Marche) (lieutenant-colonel Tarayre) and the 8th Marching Regiment (French: 8^{e} de Marche) (lieutenant-colonel Drouet) formed the 2nd Brigade of général Daudel. With three batteries de 4 and engineer company, these two brigades constituted the 1st Infantry Division of général d'Exéa (French: général d'Exéa).
- The 9th Marching Regiment (French: 9^{e} de Marche) (lieutenant-colonel Miquel de Riu) and the 10th Marching Regiment (French: 10^{e} de Marche) (lieutenant-colonel Damedor de Molans) formed the 1st Brigade of général Guerin. The 11th Marching Regiment (French: 11^{e} de Marche) (lieutenant-colonel Née-Devaux) and the 12th Marching Regiment (French: 12^{e} de Marche) (lieutenant-colonel de Labaume) formed the 2nd Brigade of général Blaise. With three batteries de 4 and one engineer company, these two brigades constituted the 2nd Infantry Division of général de Maud'Huy.
- The 13th Marching Regiment (French: 13^{e} de Marche) (lieutenant-colonel Morin) and the (French: 14^{e} de Marche) (lieutenant-colonel Vanche) with two marching chasseurs companies formed the 1st Brigade of général de Susbielle. The 35th Infantry Regiment (French: 35^{e} Régiment d'Infanterie) (colonel de la Mariouse) and the 42nd Infantry Regiment (French: 42^{e} Régiment d'Infanterie) (colonel Avril de Lenclos) formed the 2nd Brigade of général Guilhem. With three batteries de 4 and one engineer company, these two brigades constituted the 3rd Infantry Division of général Blanchard (French: général Blanchard).

==== Beginning of the Third French Republic ====
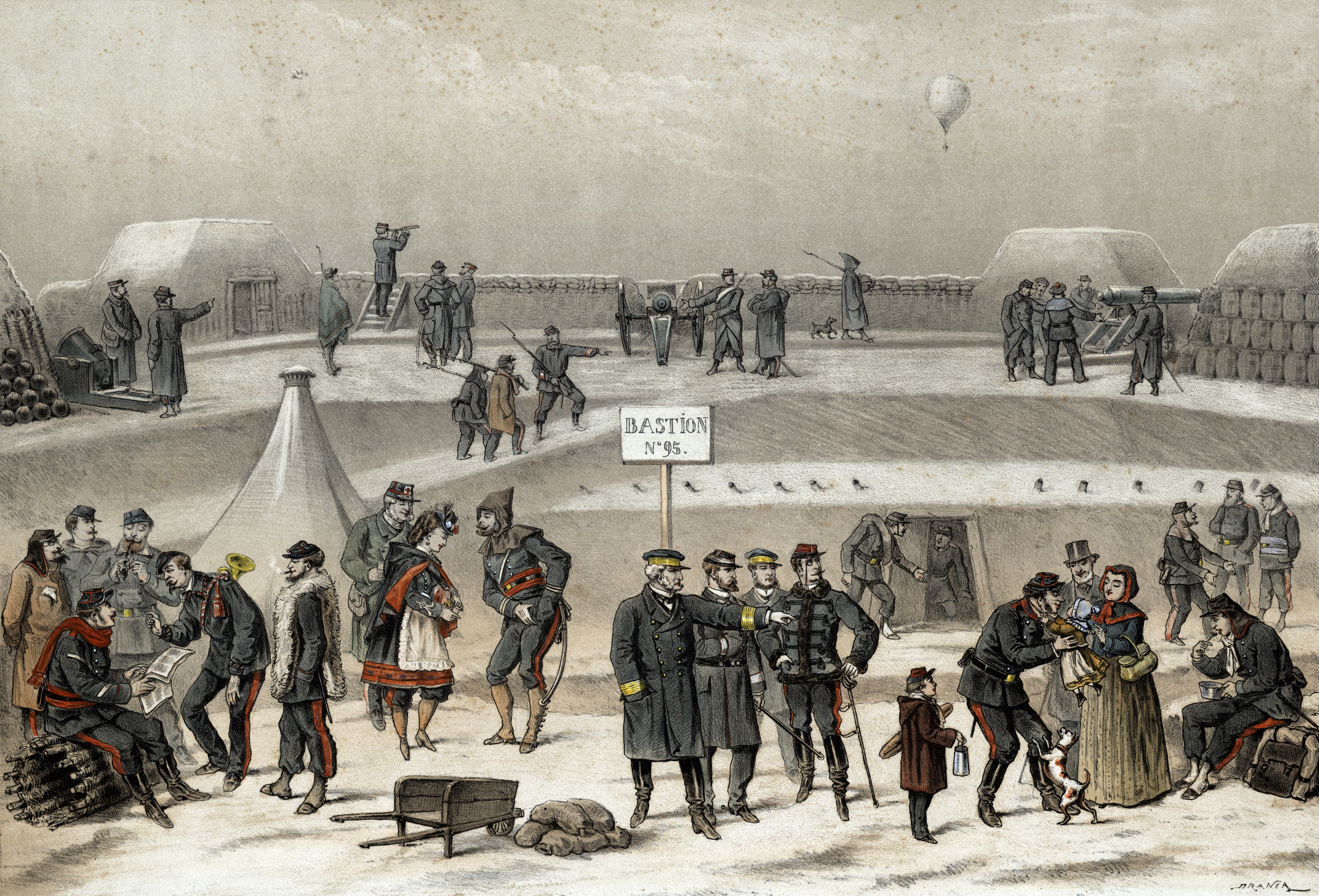
French soldiers in a Fort (French: bastion), assuring the defense of Paris in 1870 (French: défense de Paris en 1870).

===== Siege of Paris =====
Following the disaster of Sedan (French: désastre de Sedan), a national defense government (French: gouvernement de la Défense nationale) proclaimed on 4 September 1870 the Third French Republic and the decline of Emperor Napoleon III (French: Napoléon III). The 14th Army Corps (général Renault (French: général Renault)) was formed accordingly in the entrenched camp of Paris. The battalions in depot had already deployed, and the only available units left were a company of each deployed regiment, in charge of receiving soldiers recalled for service. Accordingly, the available companies were doubled. These demi-companies were supposed to form the regiment of the 14th Corps. Each new regiment accordingly consisted of eighteen different company corps.

- The 15th Marching Regiment (French: 15^{e} de Marche) (lieutenant-colonel Benedetti) and the 16th Marching Regiment (French: 16^{e} de Marche) (lieutenant-colonel Guadel) with two chasseurs companies à pied formed the 1st Marching Brigade of général Ladreit de la Charrière (French: général Ladreit de la Charrière) which was killed on 2 December 1870 during the defense of Paris.
- The 17th Marching Regiment (French: 17^{e} de Marche) (lieutenant-colonel Sermensan) and the 18th Marching Regiment (French: 18^{e} de Marche) formed the 2nd Brigade of général Lecomte (French: général Lecomte). With two batteries de 4 and one engineer section, these two brigades constituted the 1st Division of général Béchon de Caussade (French: Béchon de Caussade) which was killed on 9 November 1870 during the siege of Paris.
- The 19th Marching Regiment (French: 19^{e} de Marche) (lieutenant-colonel Collasseau) and the 20th Marching Regiment (French: 20^{e} de Marche) (lieutenant-colonel Niel) with two chasseurs companies à pied formed the 1st Brigade of général Bocher.
- The 21st Marching Regiment (French: 21^{e} de Marche) (lieutenant-colonel de Vandeuil) and the 22nd Marching Regiment (French: 22^{e} de Marche) (lieutenant-colonel Barbe) formed the 2nd Brigade of général Paturel. With two batteries de 4 and one engineer section, these two brigades constituted the 2nd Division of général d'Hugues.
- The 23rd Marching Regiment (French: 23^{e} de Marche) of (lieutenant-colonel Dupuy de Podio) and the 24th Marching Regiment (French: 24^{e} de Marche) (lieutenant-colonel Sanguinetti) with two chasseur companies formed the 1st Brigade of général Benoît.
- The 25th Marching Regiment (French: 25^{e} de Marche) (lieutenant-colonel Jourdain) and 26th Marching Regiment (French: 26^{e} de Marche) (lieutenant-colonel Lecerf) formed the 2nd Brigade of général Courty. With batteries de 4 and one engineer section, these two brigades constituted the 3rd Division of général de brigade de Maussion (French: général de brigade de Maussion).

Excluding these two army corps, a Zouaves Marching Regiment was formed from divers units, the 28th Marching Regiment (French: 28^{e} de Marche) with the depot of the Imperial Guard of the Second Empire (French: Garde Impériale), the 36th Marching Regiment (French: 28^{e} de Marche), the 37th Marching Regiment (French: 37^{e} de Marche), the 38th Marching Regiment (French: 38^{e} de Marche), and the 39th Marching Regiment (French: 39^{e} de Marche) with the depots which remained in Paris.

===== Army of the East =====
In December 1870, the different army corps of the Army of the east (French: Armée de l'Est) of général de division Bourbaki were reinforced by marching regiments.

The 15th Army Corps of général de division Martineau des Chenez received:

- The 1st Zouaves Marching Regiment (French: 1^{er} Zouaves de marche) (lieutenant-colonel Parran) and the 4th Marching Chasseur Battalion à Pied (French: 4^{e}bataillon de marche de chasseurs à pied) in the 1st Division of général D'Astugue.
- The 2nd Zouaves Marching Regiment (French: 2^{e} Zouaves de marche) (lieutenant-colonel Chevalier), 5th Marching Chasseur Battalion à Pied (French: 5^{e}bataillon de marche de chasseurs à pied) (Commandant Boudet) and the 30th Marching Regiment (French: 30^{e} de Marche) (lieutenant-colonel Godin) in the 2nd Division of général Rebillard.
- The 6th Marching Chasseur Battalion à Pied (French: 6^{e}bataillon de marche de chasseurs à pied) (Commandant Regain), the 27th de Marche (French: 27^{e} de marche) (lieutenant-colonel Péragallo), the 34th Marching Regiment (French: 34^{e} de Marche) (lieutenant-colonel Audouard) and a battalion of the 33rd Marching Regiment (French: 33^{e} de Marche) in the 3rd Division of général Peytavin.
- The 1st Marching Chasseur Battalion à Pied (French: 1^{e}bataillon de marche de chasseurs à pied) (colonel Rouher) and the 1st Cuirassiers Marching Battalion (colonel de Renusson d'Hauteville) in the Cavalry Division of général de Longuerue.

The 18th Army Corps of général de division Billot received:

- The 9th Marching Chasseur Battalion à Pied (French: 9^{e}bataillon de marche de chasseurs à pied) (Commandant N...), the 42nd Marching Regiment (French: 42^{e} de Marche) (lieutenant-colonel Couston) and the 44th Marching Regiment (French: 44^{e} de Marche) (lieutenant-colonel Achilli) in the 1st Division of général Feillet-Pilatrie.
- The 12th Marching Chasseur Battalion à Pied (French: 12^{e}bataillon de marche de chasseurs à pied) (Commandant Villeneuve), the 52nd Marching Regiment (French: 52^{e} de Marche) (lieutenant-colonel Quénot) in the 2nd Division of French Navy Contre-Amiral (Counter admiral) Jérôme-Hyacinthe Penhoat (French: Contre-Amiral Penhoat).
- The 4th Zouaves Marching Regiment (French: 4^{e} Zouaves de marche) (Colonel de Boisfleury), the 14th Marching Chasseur Battalion à Pied (French: 14^{e}bataillon de marche de chasseurs à pied) (Commandant Bonnet) and the 53rd Marching Regiment (French: 52^{e} de Marche) (lieutenant-colonel Brenières) in the 3rd Division of général Bonnet.
- The 2nd Hussard Marching Regiment (French: 2^{e} Hussards de marche) (lieutenant-colonel de Pointis), the 3rd Light Horse Lancers Regiment (French: 3^{e}lanciers de marche) (Lieutenant-colonel Renaudot), the 5th Marching Dragoons (French: 5^{e} dragons de marche) (lieutenant-colonel d'Ussel) and the 5th Marching Cuirassiers Regiment (French: 5^{e} cuirassiers de marche) (lieutenant-colonel De Brécourt) in the Cavalry Division of général de Brémond d'Ars.

The 20th Army Corps of général de division Clinchant received:

- The 25th Marching Chasseur Battalion à Pied (French: 25^{e}bataillon de marche de chasseurs à pied) (Commandant Bailly) and the 3rd Zouaves Marching Regiment (French: 3^{e} Zouaves de marche) (lieutenant-Colonel Bernard) in the 2nd Division of général de brigade Thornton.
- The 47th Marching Regiment (French: 47^{e} de Marche) (Colonel N...) in the 3rd Division of général Ségard.

The 24th Army Corps of général de division Bressolles received:

- The 15th Marching Chasseur Battalion à Pied (French: 15^{e}bataillon de marche de chasseurs à pied) and the 63rd Marching Regiment (French: 63^{e} de Marche) (Colonel N...) in the 1st Division général d'Ariès.
- The 21st Marching Chasseur Battalion à Pied (French: 21^{e}bataillon de marche de chasseurs à pied) (lieutenant-colonel Jouneau) and the 61st Marching Regiment (French: 61^{e} de Marche) (lieutenant-colonel Dauriac) in the 2nd Division of général Comagny-Thibaudin.

The General Reserve of French Navy Capitaine de frigate Pallu de la Barrière (French: Pallu de la Barrière) received:

- The 29th Marching Regiment (French: 29^{e} de Marche) (lieutenant-colonel Carré) and the Marching Regiment of Marine Infantry (French: Régiment de Marche d'Infanterie de Marine) (lieutenant-colonel Coquet) in the Infantry Brigade.
- The 1st Marching Regiment of African Chasseur (French: 1^{er} Chasseurs d'Afrique de marche) (lieutenant-colonel Gaume) and the 3rd Marching Dragoon (French: 3^{e} dragons de marche) (lieutenant-colonel Durdily) in the Cavalry Brigade of général de Boério.

=== World War I ===
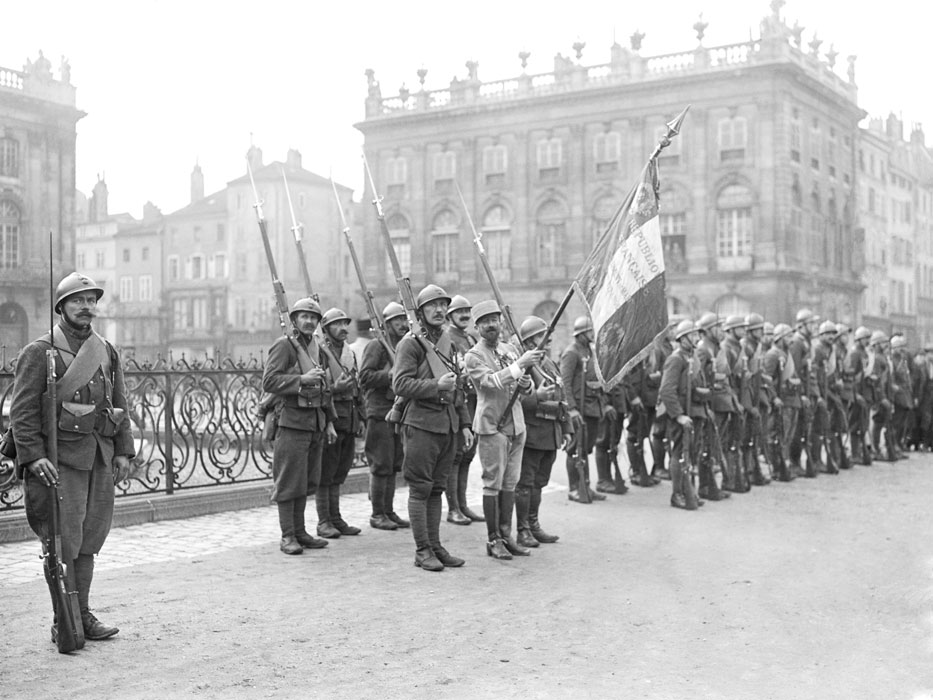
Revue of the Marching Regiment of the Foreign Legion RMLE, in November 1918, at Nancy.

Less than a year from the beginning of first world war, the government decided on 25 January 1912, to constitute 40 Marching Battalions, as in 2 Marching Battalion by military region. They were formed of new recruits, reserve soldiers in the depot of garrisons and the wounded medically refit for service.

Marching Regiments were equally created from the troupes d'Afrique (French: troupes d'Afrique), such as the 4th Marching Tirailleurs Regiment. The 1st Foreign Regiment 1^{er} RE of Sidi Bel-Abbès and the 2nd Foreign Regiment 2^{e} RE of Saida, garrisoned in Algeria, mounted four demi-battalions destined constitute the principal formations of the future regiments:

- The 2nd Marching Regiment of the 2nd Foreign Regiment, (French: 2^{e} Régiment de Marche du 2^{e} Régiment Etranger), 2^{e}R.M.2^{e}R.E (1914 – 1915).
- The 2nd Marching Regiment of the 1st Foreign Regiment, (French: 2^{e} Régiment de Marche du 1^{er} Régiment Etranger), 2^{e}R.M.1^{er}R.E (1914 – 1915).
- The 3rd Marching Regiment of the 1st Foreign Regiment, (French: 3^{e} Régiment de Marche du 1^{er} Régiment Etranger), 3^{e}R.M.1^{er}R.E (1914 – 1915).
- The 4th Marching Regiment of the 1st Foreign Regiment, (French: 4^{e} Régiment de Marche du 1^{er} Régiment Etranger), 4^{e}R.M.1^{er}R.E (1914–1915).

The Marching Regiment of the Foreign Legion (RMLE) was created on 11 November 1915 by fusion of the 2nd Marching Regiment of the 1st Foreign Regiment (2^{e}RM 1^{er}RE) and the 2nd Marching Regiment of the 2nd Foreign Regiment (2^{e}RM 2^{e} RE). The Marching Regiment participated to Battle of the Somme (French: bataille de la Somme) in 1916 and to Second Battle of the Marne (French: seconde bataille de la Marne) in 1918.

Whilst the Foreign Legion's battalions de marche are the most renowned in WW1, other troop types were similarly grouped, such as the 1^{er} Régiment de Marche d’Infanterie Colonial du Maroc associated with the Moroccan Division (France). In Palestine, the Détachement Français de Palestine et de Syrie comprised such a regiment of Tirailleurs Algériens and of Armenian volunteers in the Légion d'Orient.

The first Régiment de Marche d’Afrique was made up of two troop types of the Armée d'Afrique, its first two battalions formed of Zouaves and its third of Foreign Legionnaires. The second regiment was formed solely of Zouaves. Both units were in the Corps expéditionnaire d'Orient and saw combat in the Gallipoli campaign.

=== World War II ===
On the outbreak of World War II in September 1939, a Marching Regiment was constituted from the three battalions of the 146th Fortress Infantry Regiment (French: 146^{e} Régiment d'Infanterie de Forteresse), the 156th Fortress Infantry Regiment (French: 156^{e} Régiment d'Infanterie de Forteresse), and the 160th Fortress Infantry Regiment (French: 160^{e} Régiment d'Infanterie de Forteresse), to participate in the Saar Offensive (French: offensive de la Sarre). This Marching Regiment penetrated Germany through the woods of Warndt, then received an order to retreat following the capitulation of Poland.

At the same time, Marching Regiments of the Foreign Legion were constituted to gather foreigners wishing to serve in the French Army. Accordingly, 5,000 Ukrainian volunteers who did not want to serve in either the Polish or Soviet forces, enlisted in the 21st, 22nd and 23rd Marching Regiments of Foreign Volunteers (RMVE).

Following the Armistice of 22 June 1940 (French: armistice du 22 juin 1940), the African units which rallied to Free France (French: France Libre) were organized by général de Gaulle in Marching Battalions principally in the 1st Free French Division (French: 1^{re} Division Française Libre). The 1st Marching Regiment of Moroccan Spahis (French: 1^{er} Régiment de Marche de Spahis Marocains), created on 24 September 1942, was the first Marching Regiment of Free France. The Marching Regiment of Tchad, created in July 1943 from the Senegalese Tirailleurs of Tchad, was the first Regiment of Free France, and illustrated capability at Kufra (French: Koufra) until Germany. Due to these Faits d'armes, this regiment was the only marching regiment which was not dissolved after the Liberation and which still is active under the respective designation.

From 1 July 1943 until 1 July 1945, the 3rd Foreign Infantry Regiment 3^{e} REI had been designated as Marching Regiment of the Foreign Legion (RMLE) which was the original designation for the latter from 15 November 1915 until 15 November 1920.

=== First Indochina War ===
In May 1945, the French Foreign Legion started the creation of a régiment de marche to be sent to re-occupy Indochina; their training and administrative base at Sidi-bel-Abbès, sixty miles south of Oran in northwest Algeria. During the Indochina war, the Legion's strength would reach 30,000 men.

== Other armies Marching Units ==
=== Austria-Hungary ===
The Austro-Hungarian Army made use of marching units during World War I. The Marching Battalions were regrouped in Marching Regiments, and two marching regiments formed the Marching Brigade.

=== Germany ===
==== Grand Duchy of Baden ====
In 1808 the Grand Duchy of Baden, created in 1806 under the impulsion of Napoleon I, contributed a combined infantry regiment for service alongside the French in the Peninsular War. In 1809 it became the Linien-Infantry-Regiment N°4.

==== Electorate of Bavaria ====
During the Battle of Hohenlinden in December 1800 the Bavarian Corps, serving alongside the Austro-Hungarian Army against the French, had a Combined Light Horse Regiment consisting of six squadrons. Such was one of the first appearances of this type of regiment.

==== Kingdom of Prussia ====
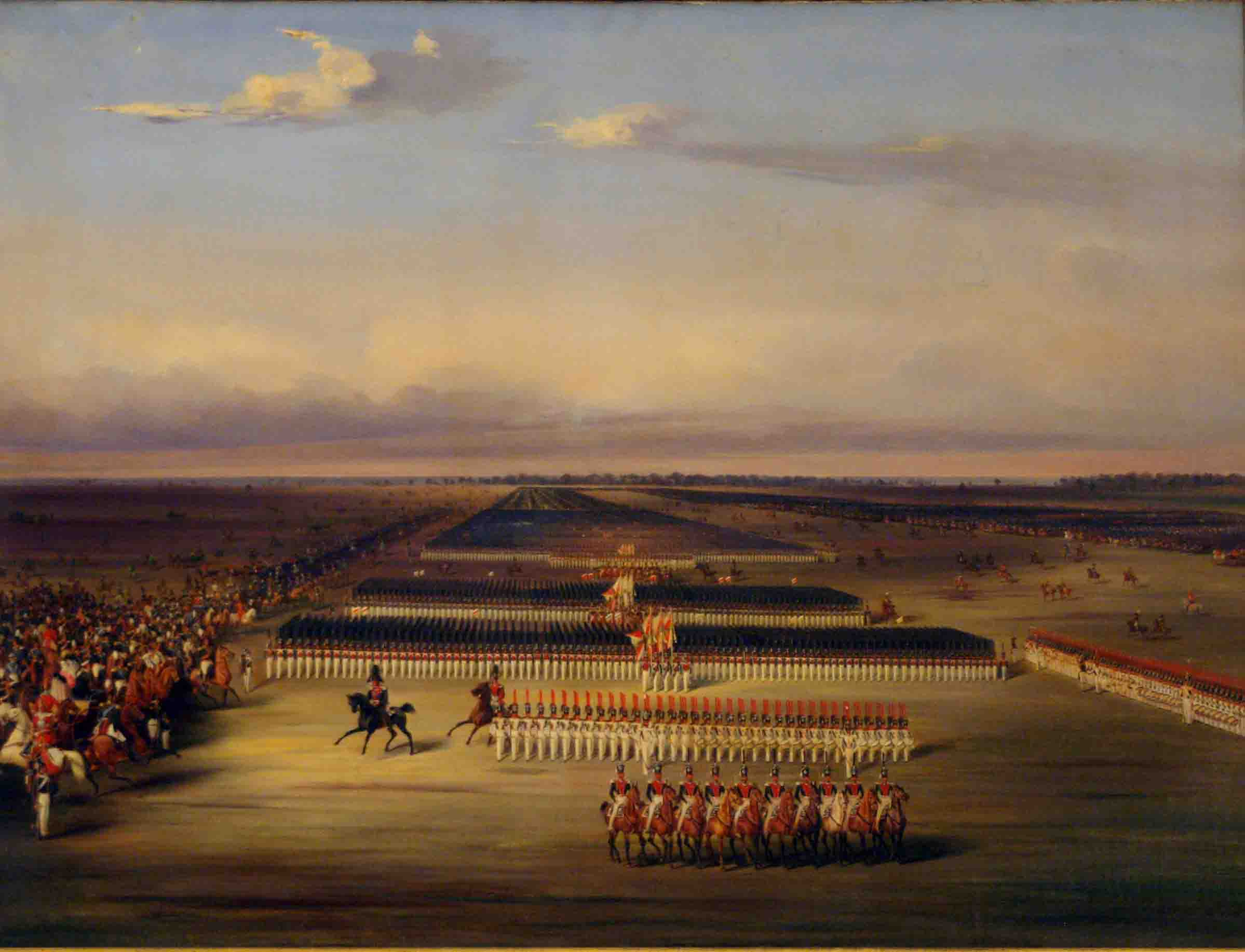
Revue of the Grand-Maneuvers of Kalisch which united in 1835, Combined Regiments of the Kingdom of Prussia and the Russian Empire.

In 1812, the auxiliary corps of the Kingdom of Prussia was essentially formed of combined regiments composed of battalions or squadrons issued from the different regiments.

Once peace prevailed again, Prussia continued deploying combined regiments during grand maneuvers. Accordingly, during the grand maneuvers of Kalisch, which took place during the summer of 1835 the Russian and Prussian Army, the latter having contributed two combined cavalry regiment and a combined infantry regiment.

In 1859 and 1860 a new short-lived form of combined regiments was created. Those were Landwehr regiments augmented by mobilized reserve troops and reserve formations, named "Combined Infantry Regiment". In 1860 they were converted into regular infantry regiments.

==== German Empire ====
During World War I the German Imperial Army formed marching regiments from various incomplete units and detached elements; like the 79.R/85.L which was formed with the staff and four companies of the 79th Reserve Infantry Regiment and two battalions of the 85th Landwehr Regiment.

==== German Reich ====
During World War II the Wehrmacht used the term Kampfgruppe for ad hoc formations; usually with combined arms and anywhere from companies to a full corps in size.

=== Russia ===
In October 1813, during the Battle of Leipzig, the Russian reserve Army of Poland commanded by Levin August von Bennigsen consisted of 2nd Combined Regiments of Uhlan comprising four squadrons.

In the years of 1830, the Imperial Russian Army had taken the habit of creating Combined Regiments, formed of various regular units, to participate to grand-maneuvers. During the Grand-Maneuvers of Kalisch, which united in 1835 the Prussian Army and Russia Army, Russian Imperial Guard placed in lieu a combined cavalry regiment and a combined infantry regiment.
