= Communauté de communes de la Région d'Oisemont =

Coordinates: 49.9553°N 1.7663°E

Région d'Oisemont
- Former communauté de communes
- Interactive map of Région d'Oisemont
- Country: France
- Region: Hauts-de-France
- Department: Somme
- No. of communes: {{{nbcomm}}}
- Established: 30 December 1994
- Disbanded: 2017
- Area: 161 km^{2} (62 sq mi)
- Population (2013): 6,790
  - Density: 42.2/km^{2} (109/sq mi)

The Communauté de communes de la Région d'Oisemont is a former communauté de communes in the Somme département and in the Picardie région of France. It was created in December 1994. It was merged into the new Communauté de communes Somme Sud-Ouest in January 2017.

== Composition ==
This Communauté de communes comprised 34 communes:

1. Andainville
2. Aumâtre
3. Avesnes-Chaussoy
4. Bermesnil
5. Cannessières
6. Cerisy-Buleux
7. Épaumesnil
8. Étréjust
9. Fontaine-le-Sec
10. Forceville-en-Vimeu
11. Foucaucourt-Hors-Nesle
12. Framicourt
13. Fresnes-Tilloloy
14. Fresneville
15. Fresnoy-Andainville
16. Frettecuisse
17. Heucourt-Croquoison
18. Inval-Boiron
19. Lignières-en-Vimeu
20. Le Mazis
21. Mouflières
22. Nesle-l'Hôpital
23. Neslette
24. Neuville-au-Bois
25. Oisemont
26. Rambures
27. Saint-Aubin-Rivière
28. Saint-Léger-sur-Bresle
29. Saint-Maulvis
30. Senarpont
31. Le Translay
32. Vergies
33. Villeroy
34. Woirel

== Financial responsibilities ==
The body has jurisdiction over:

- Economic & social development, housing and land
- Schools: preparation and transport
- Roads
- Tourism
- Sewerage

== See also ==
- Communes of the Somme department
