= Canton of Hornoy-le-Bourg =

Coordinates: 49°50′46″N 1°54′8″E

Hornoy-le-Bourg
- Former canton
- Interactive map of Hornoy-le-Bourg
- Country: France
- Region: Hauts-de-France
- Department: Somme
- No. of communes: {{{nbcomm}}}
- Disbanded: 2015
- Area: 151.78 km^{2} (58.60 sq mi)
- Population (2012): 5,803
  - Density: 38.23/km^{2} (99.02/sq mi)

The Canton of Hornoy-le-Bourg is a former canton situated in the department of the Somme and in the Picardie region of northern France. It was disbanded following the French canton reorganisation which came into effect in March 2015. It consisted of 16 communes, which joined the canton of Poix-de-Picardie in 2015. It had 5,803 inhabitants (2012).

== Geography ==
The canton was organised around the commune of Hornoy-le-Bourg in the arrondissement of Amiens. The altitude varies from 48m at Belloy-Saint-Léonard to 211m at Beaucamps-le-Jeune for an average of 161m.

The canton comprised 16 communes:

- Arguel
- Aumont
- Beaucamps-le-Jeune
- Beaucamps-le-Vieux
- Belloy-Saint-Léonard
- Brocourt
- Dromesnil
- Hornoy-le-Bourg
- Lafresguimont-Saint-Martin
- Liomer
- Méricourt-en-Vimeu
- Le Quesne
- Saint-Germain-sur-Bresle
- Thieulloy-l'Abbaye
- Villers-Campsart
- Vraignes-lès-Hornoy

== Population ==
1962	1968	1975	1982	1990	1999
5866	5907	5965	5718	5471	5436
Census count starting from 1962 : Population without double counting

== See also ==
- Arrondissements of the Somme department
- Cantons of the Somme department
- Communes of the Somme department
