= Arguel =

Arguel is the name of the following communes in France:

- Arguel, Doubs, in the Doubs department
- Arguel, Somme, in the Somme department
