= Courcelles-sous-Moyencourt =

- Commune
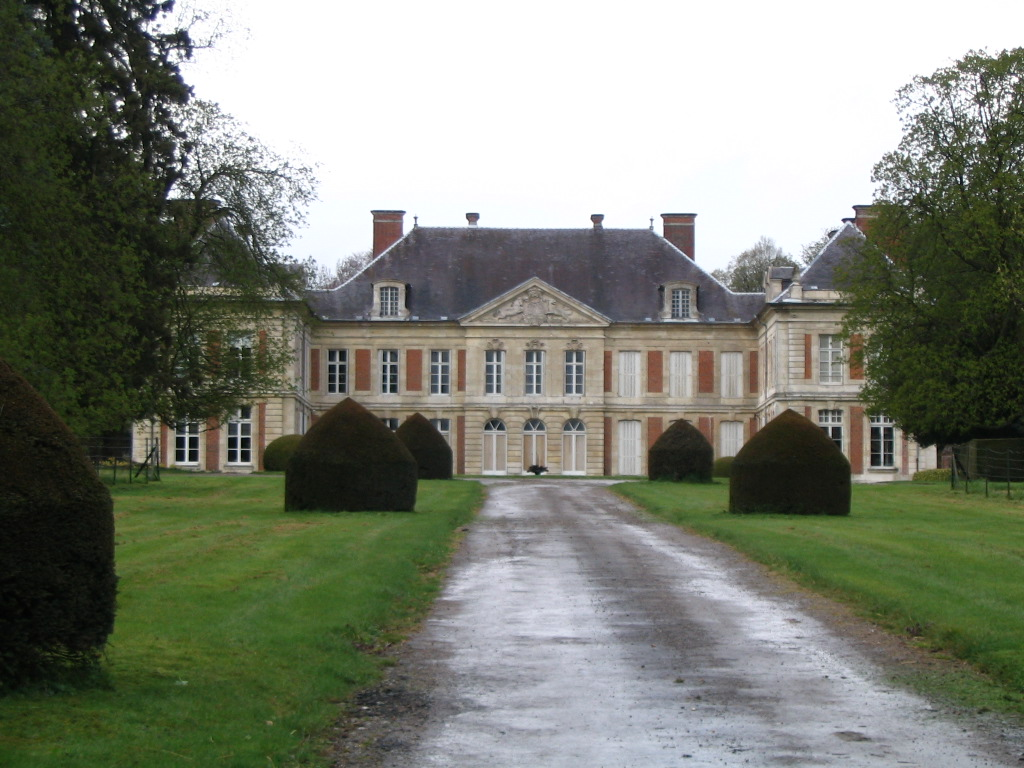
- The château of Courcelles-sous-Moyencourt

- Coat of arms
- Location of Courcelles-sous-Moyencourt
- Location within France Location within Hauts-de-France
- Coordinates: 49°48′51″N 2°02′43″E
- Country: France
- Region: Hauts-de-France
- Department: Somme
- Arrondissement: Amiens
- Canton: Poix-de-Picardie
- Intercommunality: CC Somme Sud-Ouest

Government
  - Mayor (2020–2026): Jean-Pierre Chopin
- Area^{1}: 6.78 km^{2} (2.62 sq mi)
- Elevation: 130 m (430 ft)
- Highest elevation: 162 m (531 ft)
- Lowest elevation: 97 m (318 ft)
- Population (2023): 164
  - Density: 24.2/km^{2} (62.6/sq mi)
- Time zone: UTC+01:00 (CET)
  - Summer (DST): UTC+02:00 (CEST)
- INSEE/Postal code: 80218 /80290
- ^{1} French Land Register data, which excludes lakes, ponds, glaciers > 1 km^{2} (0.386 sq mi or 247 acres) and river estuaries.

Courcelles-sous-Moyencourt (French pronunciation: [kuʁsɛl su mwajɛ̃kuʁ], literally Courcelles under Moyencourt; Picard: Courchelle-dsous-Moyincourt) is a commune in the northern French department of Somme.

== Geography ==
The commune is situated on the D258 road, between the A29 autoroute and the N29 road some 15 miles (24 km) southwest of Amiens.

== Population ==
Historical population
| Year | Pop. | ±% p.a. |
|---|---|---|
| 1968 | 118 | — |
| 1975 | 103 | −1.92% |
| 1982 | 119 | +2.08% |
| 1990 | 133 | +1.40% |
| 1999 | 141 | +0.65% |
| 2007 | 135 | −0.54% |
| 2012 | 125 | −1.53% |
| 2017 | 139 | +2.15% |
| 2023 | 164 | +2.79% |
Source: INSEE

== See also ==
- Communes of the Somme department
