= Oresmaux =

- Commune
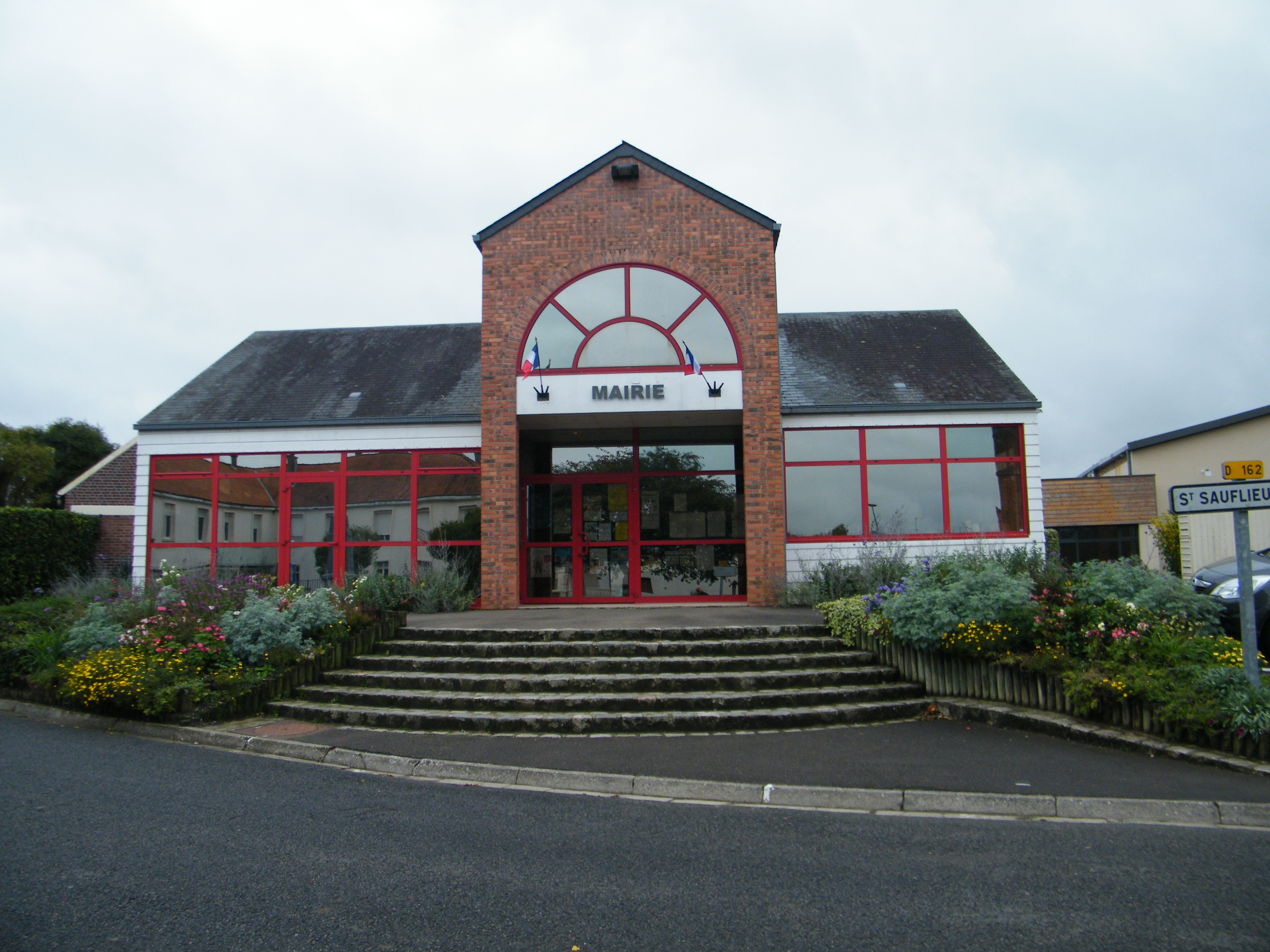
- The town hall in Oresmaux
- Location of Oresmaux
- Location within France Location within Hauts-de-France
- Coordinates: 49°46′07″N 2°16′19″E
- Country: France
- Region: Hauts-de-France
- Department: Somme
- Arrondissement: Amiens
- Canton: Ailly-sur-Noye
- Intercommunality: CC Somme Sud-Ouest

Government
  - Mayor (2020–2026): Michèle Péronne
- Area^{1}: 11.03 km^{2} (4.26 sq mi)
- Elevation: 105 m (344 ft)
- Highest elevation: 151 m (495 ft)
- Lowest elevation: 89 m (292 ft)
- Population (2023): 998
  - Density: 90.5/km^{2} (234/sq mi)
- Time zone: UTC+01:00 (CET)
  - Summer (DST): UTC+02:00 (CEST)
- INSEE/Postal code: 80611 /80160
- ^{1} French Land Register data, which excludes lakes, ponds, glaciers > 1 km^{2} (0.386 sq mi or 247 acres) and river estuaries.

Oresmaux (French pronunciation: [ɔʁemo]; Picard: Orémieu) is a commune in the Somme department in Hauts-de-France in northern France.

== Geography ==
Oresmaux is situated on the D192 road, some 9 miles (14 km) south of Amiens.

== Population ==
Historical population
Year	Pop.	±% p.a.
1968	647	—
1975	634	−0.29%
1982	638	+0.09%
1990	723	+1.58%
1999	759	+0.54%
2007	822	+1.00%
2012	829	+0.17%
2017	930	+2.33%
2023	998	+1.18%
Source: INSEE

== See also ==
- Communes of the Somme department
