= Sentelie =

- Commune
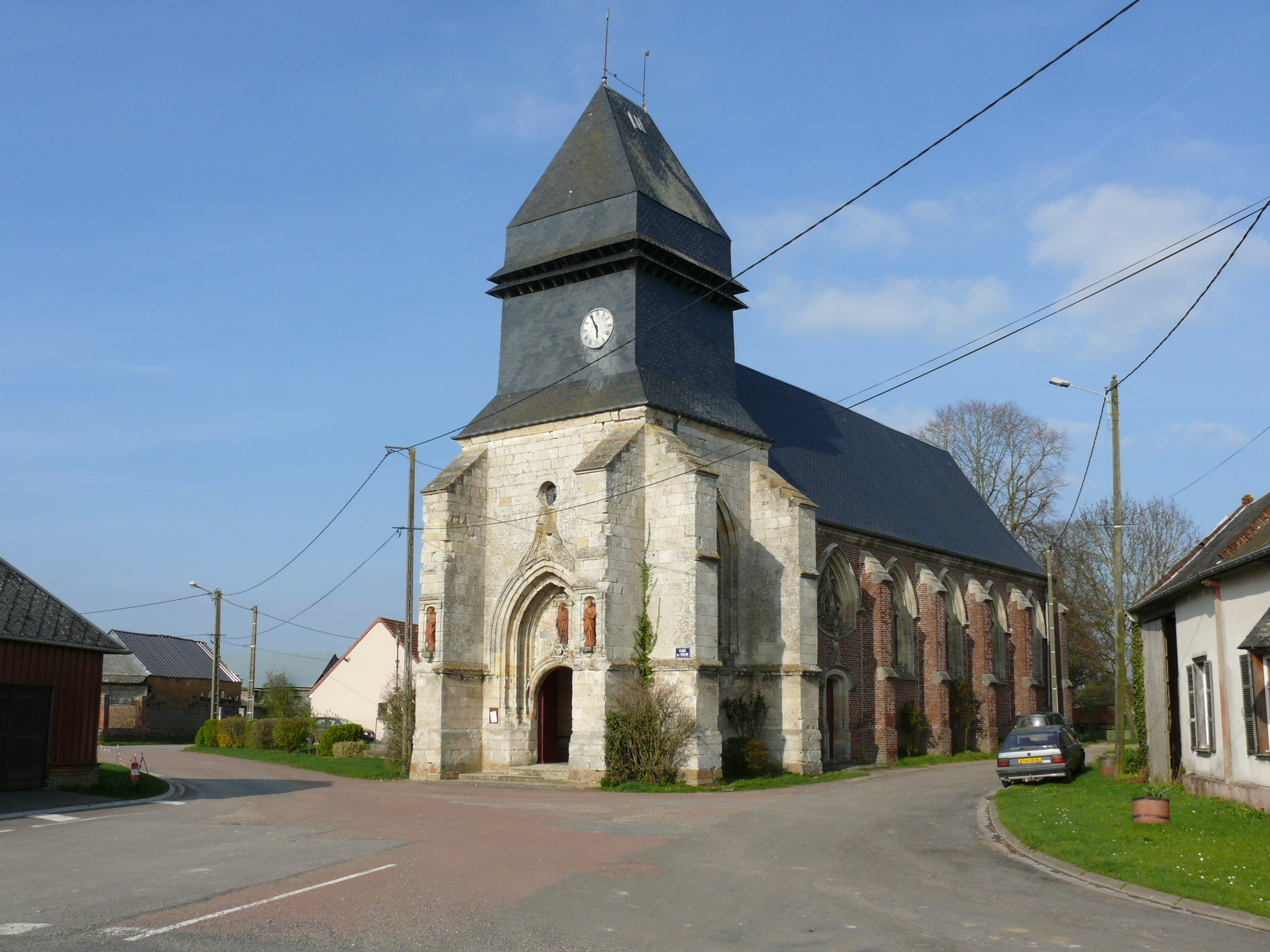
- The church in Sentelie

- Coat of arms
- Location of Sentelie
- Location within France Location within Hauts-de-France
- Coordinates: 49°43′30″N 2°01′39″E
- Country: France
- Region: Hauts-de-France
- Department: Somme
- Arrondissement: Amiens
- Canton: Ailly-sur-Noye
- Intercommunality: CC Somme Sud-Ouest

Government
  - Mayor (2020–2026): Patrick Rimbert
- Area^{1}: 5.53 km^{2} (2.14 sq mi)
- Elevation: 182 m (597 ft)
- Highest elevation: 187 m (614 ft)
- Lowest elevation: 122 m (400 ft)
- Population (2023): 217
  - Density: 39.2/km^{2} (102/sq mi)
- Time zone: UTC+01:00 (CET)
  - Summer (DST): UTC+02:00 (CEST)
- INSEE/Postal code: 80734 /80160
- ^{1} French Land Register data, which excludes lakes, ponds, glaciers > 1 km^{2} (0.386 sq mi or 247 acres) and river estuaries.

Sentelie (French pronunciation: [sɑ̃tli]) is a commune in the Somme department in Hauts-de-France in northern France.

== Geography ==
Sentelie is situated 16 miles (26 km) southwest of Amiens, on the D138 road

== Population ==
Historical population
Year	Pop.	±% p.a.
1968	210	—
1975	196	−0.98%
1982	176	−1.53%
1990	190	+0.96%
1999	215	+1.38%
2007	209	−0.35%
2012	203	−0.58%
2017	208	+0.49%
2023	217	+0.71%
Source: INSEE

== Places of interest ==
- The 15th / sixteenth century church of Saint Nicolas.
- The fifteenth century chapel of Saint Lambert, once a place of pilgrimage.

== See also ==
- Communes of the Somme department
