= Communauté de communes Somme Sud-Ouest =

Federation of municipalities in France

Somme Sud-Ouest
- Communauté de communes
- Interactive map of Somme Sud-Ouest
- Coordinates: 49°47′N 01°59′E
- Country: France
- Region: Hauts-de-France
- Department: Somme
- No. of communes: {{{nbcomm}}}
- Established: 2017
- Area: 909.2 km^{2} (351.0 sq mi)
- Population (2019): 38,575
  - Density: 42.43/km^{2} (109.9/sq mi)

The Communauté de communes Somme-Sud-Ouest is a communauté de communes in the Somme département and in the Hauts-de-France région of France. It was formed on 1 January 2017 by the merger of the former Communauté de communes du Contynois, the Communauté de communes de la Région d'Oisemont and the Communauté de communes du Sud-Ouest Amiénois. It consists of 119 communes, and its seat is in Poix-de-Picardie. Its area is 909.2 km^{2}, and its population was 38,575 in 2019.

== Composition ==
The communauté de communes consists of the following 119 communes:

1. Airaines
2. Allery
3. Andainville
4. Arguel
5. Aumâtre
6. Aumont
7. Avelesges
8. Avesnes-Chaussoy
9. Bacouel-sur-Selle
10. Beaucamps-le-Jeune
11. Beaucamps-le-Vieux
12. Belleuse
13. Belloy-Saint-Léonard
14. Bergicourt
15. Bermesnil
16. Bettembos
17. Blangy-sous-Poix
18. Bosquel
19. Bougainville
20. Brassy
21. Briquemesnil-Floxicourt
22. Brocourt
23. Bussy-lès-Poix
24. Camps-en-Amiénois
25. Cannessières
26. Caulières
27. Cerisy-Buleux
28. Contre
29. Conty
30. Courcelles-sous-Moyencourt
31. Courcelles-sous-Thoix
32. Croixrault
33. Dromesnil
34. Épaumesnil
35. Éplessier
36. Équennes-Éramecourt
37. Essertaux
38. Étréjust
39. Famechon
40. Fleury
41. Fluy
42. Fontaine-le-Sec
43. Forceville-en-Vimeu
44. Fossemanant
45. Foucaucourt-Hors-Nesle
46. Fourcigny
47. Framicourt
48. Frémontiers
49. Fresnes-Tilloloy
50. Fresneville
51. Fresnoy-Andainville
52. Fresnoy-au-Val
53. Frettecuisse
54. Fricamps
55. Gauville
56. Guizancourt
57. Hescamps
58. Heucourt-Croquoison
59. Hornoy-le-Bourg
60. Inval-Boiron
61. Lachapelle
62. Lafresguimont-Saint-Martin
63. Laleu
64. Lamaronde
65. Lignières-Châtelain
66. Lignières-en-Vimeu
67. Liomer
68. Marlers
69. Le Mazis
70. Meigneux
71. Méréaucourt
72. Méricourt-en-Vimeu
73. Métigny
74. Molliens-Dreuil
75. Monsures
76. Montagne-Fayel
77. Morvillers-Saint-Saturnin
78. Mouflières
79. Moyencourt-lès-Poix
80. Namps-Maisnil
81. Nampty
82. Nesle-l'Hôpital
83. Neslette
84. Neuville-au-Bois
85. Neuville-Coppegueule
86. Ô-de-Selle
87. Offignies
88. Oisemont
89. Oissy
90. Oresmaux
91. Plachy-Buyon
92. Poix-de-Picardie
93. Prouzel
94. Le Quesne
95. Quesnoy-sur-Airaines
96. Quevauvillers
97. Rambures
98. Riencourt
99. Saint-Aubin-Montenoy
100. Saint-Aubin-Rivière
101. Sainte-Segrée
102. Saint-Germain-sur-Bresle
103. Saint-Léger-sur-Bresle
104. Saint-Maulvis
105. Saulchoy-sous-Poix
106. Senarpont
107. Sentelie
108. Tailly
109. Thieulloy-l'Abbaye
110. Thieulloy-la-Ville
111. Thoix
112. Le Translay
113. Velennes
114. Vergies
115. Villeroy
116. Villers-Campsart
117. Vraignes-lès-Hornoy
118. Warlus
119. Woirel
