= Contre =

- Commune
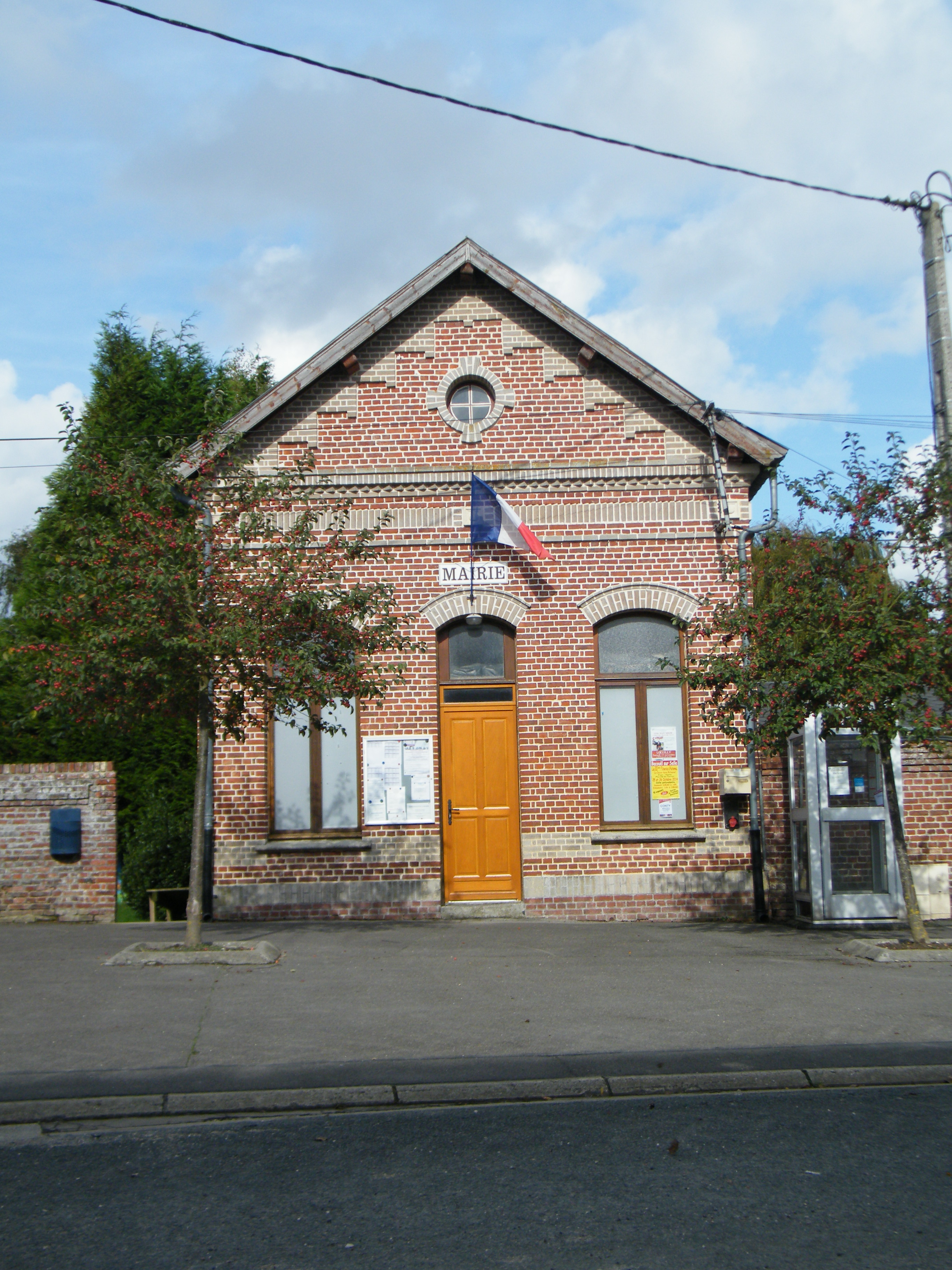
- The town hall in Contre
- Location of Contre
- Location within France Location within Hauts-de-France
- Coordinates: 49°44′56″N 2°05′51″E
- Country: France
- Region: Hauts-de-France
- Department: Somme
- Arrondissement: Amiens
- Canton: Ailly-sur-Noye
- Intercommunality: CC Somme Sud-Ouest

Government
  - Mayor (2020–2026): Yolaine Van Pradelles De Palmaert
- Area^{1}: 9.75 km^{2} (3.76 sq mi)
- Elevation: 66 m (217 ft)
- Highest elevation: 178 m (584 ft)
- Lowest elevation: 61 m (200 ft)
- Population (2023): 149
  - Density: 15.3/km^{2} (39.6/sq mi)
- Time zone: UTC+01:00 (CET)
  - Summer (DST): UTC+02:00 (CEST)
- INSEE/Postal code: 80210 /80160
- ^{1} French Land Register data, which excludes lakes, ponds, glaciers > 1 km^{2} (0.386 sq mi or 247 acres) and river estuaries.

Contre (French pronunciation: [kɔ̃tʁ]; Picard: Conte) is a commune in the Somme department in Hauts-de-France in northern France.

== Geography ==
Contre is situated on the D242 road, some 20 miles (32 km) southwest of Amiens.

== Population ==
Historical population
Year	Pop.	±% p.a.
1968	97	—
1975	72	−4.17%
1982	76	+0.78%
1990	73	−0.50%
1999	91	+2.48%
2007	119	+3.41%
2012	147	+4.32%
2017	153	+0.80%
2023	149	−0.44%
Source: INSEE

== See also ==
- Communes of the Somme department
