= Woirel =

- Commune
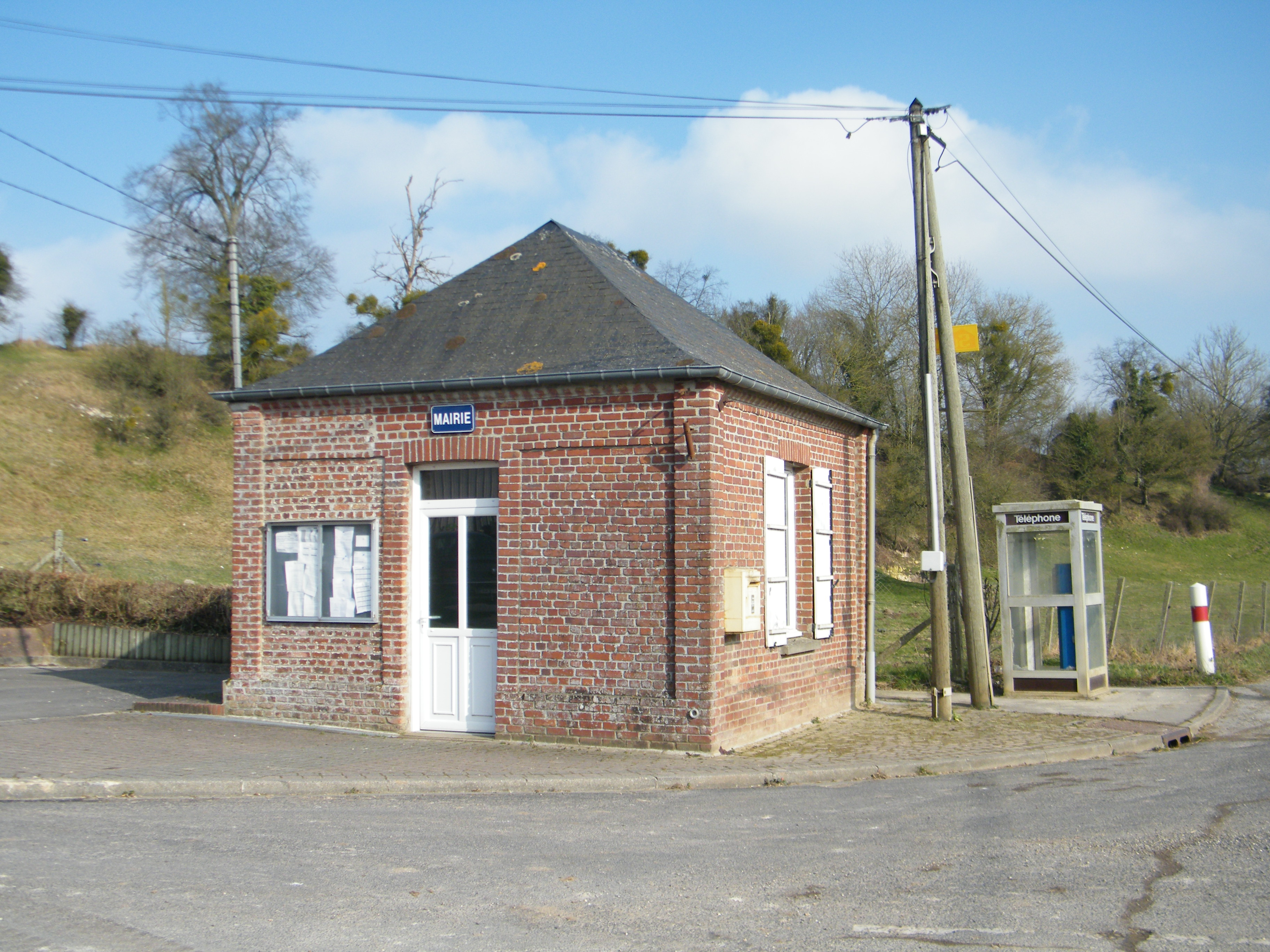
- The town hall in Woirel
- Location of Woirel
- Location within France Location within Hauts-de-France
- Coordinates: 49°57′36″N 1°49′27″E
- Country: France
- Region: Hauts-de-France
- Department: Somme
- Arrondissement: Amiens
- Canton: Poix-de-Picardie
- Intercommunality: Somme Sud-Ouest

Government
  - Mayor (2020–2026): Hervé Brutelle
- Area^{1}: 1.85 km^{2} (0.71 sq mi)
- Elevation: 35 m (115 ft)
- Highest elevation: 118 m (387 ft)
- Lowest elevation: 58 m (190 ft)
- Population (2023): 46
  - Density: 25/km^{2} (64/sq mi)
- Time zone: UTC+01:00 (CET)
  - Summer (DST): UTC+02:00 (CEST)
- INSEE/Postal code: 80828 /80140
- ^{1} French Land Register data, which excludes lakes, ponds, glaciers > 1 km^{2} (0.386 sq mi or 247 acres) and river estuaries.

Woirel (French pronunciation: [waʁɛl]; Picard: Wérél) is a commune in the Somme department in Hauts-de-France in northern France.

== Geography ==
Woirel is situated 10 miles (16 km) south of Abbeville, on the D936 road

== Population ==
Historical population
Year	Pop.	±% p.a.
1968	37	—
1975	38	+0.38%
1982	29	−3.79%
1990	29	+0.00%
1999	24	−2.08%
2007	36	+5.20%
2012	43	+3.62%
2017	60	+6.89%
2023	46	−4.33%
Source: INSEE

== See also ==
- Communes of the Somme department
