= Fresnoy-Andainville =

- Commune
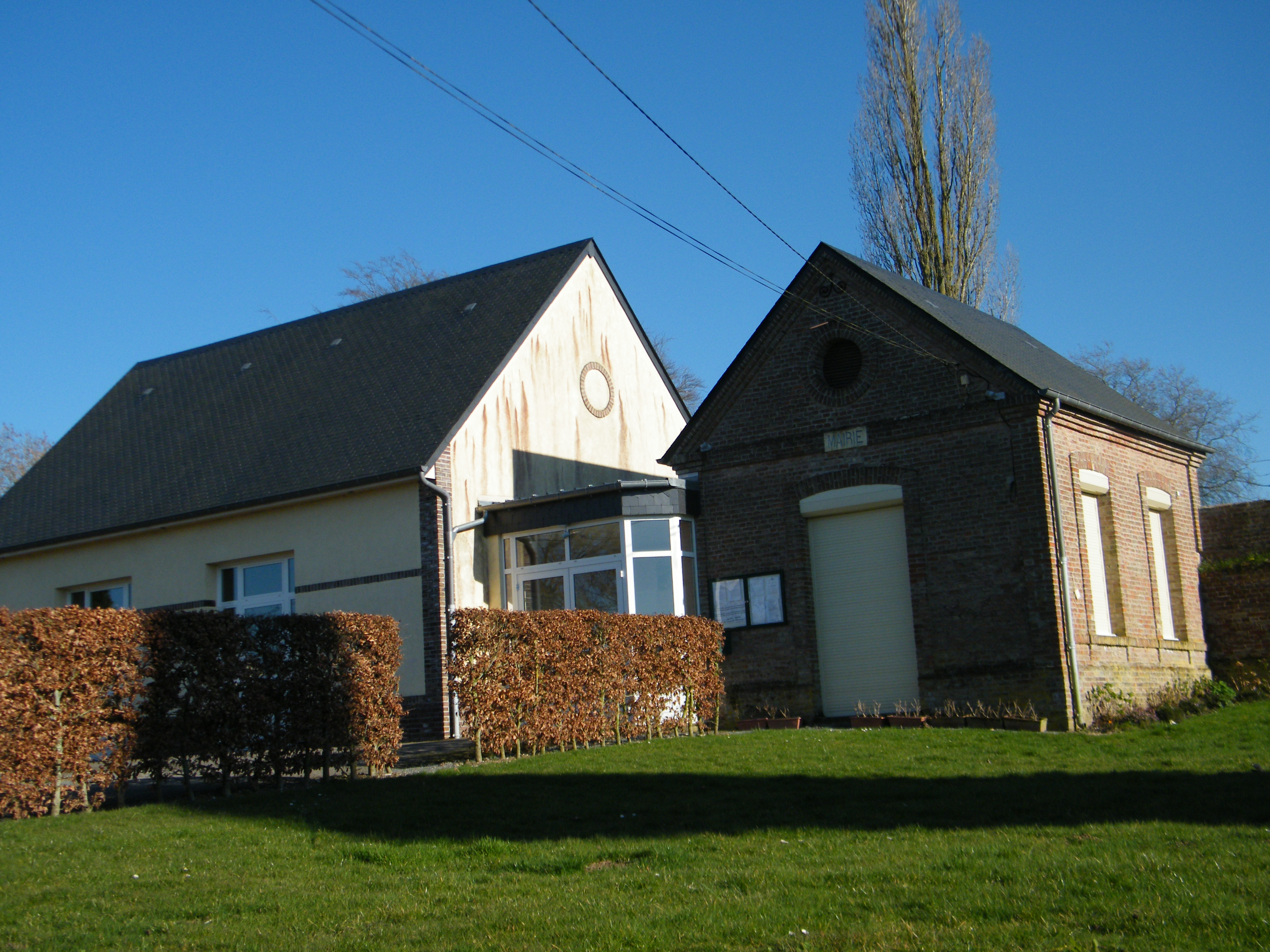
- The town hall in Fresnoy-Andainville

- Coat of arms
- Location of Fresnoy-Andainville
- Location within France Location within Hauts-de-France
- Coordinates: 49°54′41″N 1°47′42″E
- Country: France
- Region: Hauts-de-France
- Department: Somme
- Arrondissement: Amiens
- Canton: Poix-de-Picardie
- Intercommunality: CC Somme Sud-Ouest

Government
  - Mayor (2020–2026): Mariel Gambier
- Area^{1}: 3.96 km^{2} (1.53 sq mi)
- Elevation: 120 m (390 ft)
- Highest elevation: 152 m (499 ft)
- Lowest elevation: 122 m (400 ft)
- Population (2023): 96
  - Density: 24/km^{2} (63/sq mi)
- Time zone: UTC+01:00 (CET)
  - Summer (DST): UTC+02:00 (CEST)
- INSEE/Postal code: 80356 /80140
- ^{1} French Land Register data, which excludes lakes, ponds, glaciers > 1 km^{2} (0.386 sq mi or 247 acres) and river estuaries.

Fresnoy-Andainville (French pronunciation: [fʁɛnwa ɑ̃dɛ̃vil]) is a commune in the Somme department in Hauts-de-France in northern France.

== Geography ==
The commune is situated 16 miles (26 km) south of Abbeville by the D92 road

== Population ==
Historical population
| Year | Pop. | ±% p.a. |
|---|---|---|
| 1968 | 130 | — |
| 1975 | 133 | +0.33% |
| 1982 | 101 | −3.86% |
| 1990 | 100 | −0.12% |
| 1999 | 80 | −2.45% |
| 2007 | 86 | +0.91% |
| 2012 | 100 | +3.06% |
| 2017 | 86 | −2.97% |
| 2023 | 96 | +1.85% |
Source: INSEE

== See also ==
- Communes of the Somme department
