= Neslette =

- Commune
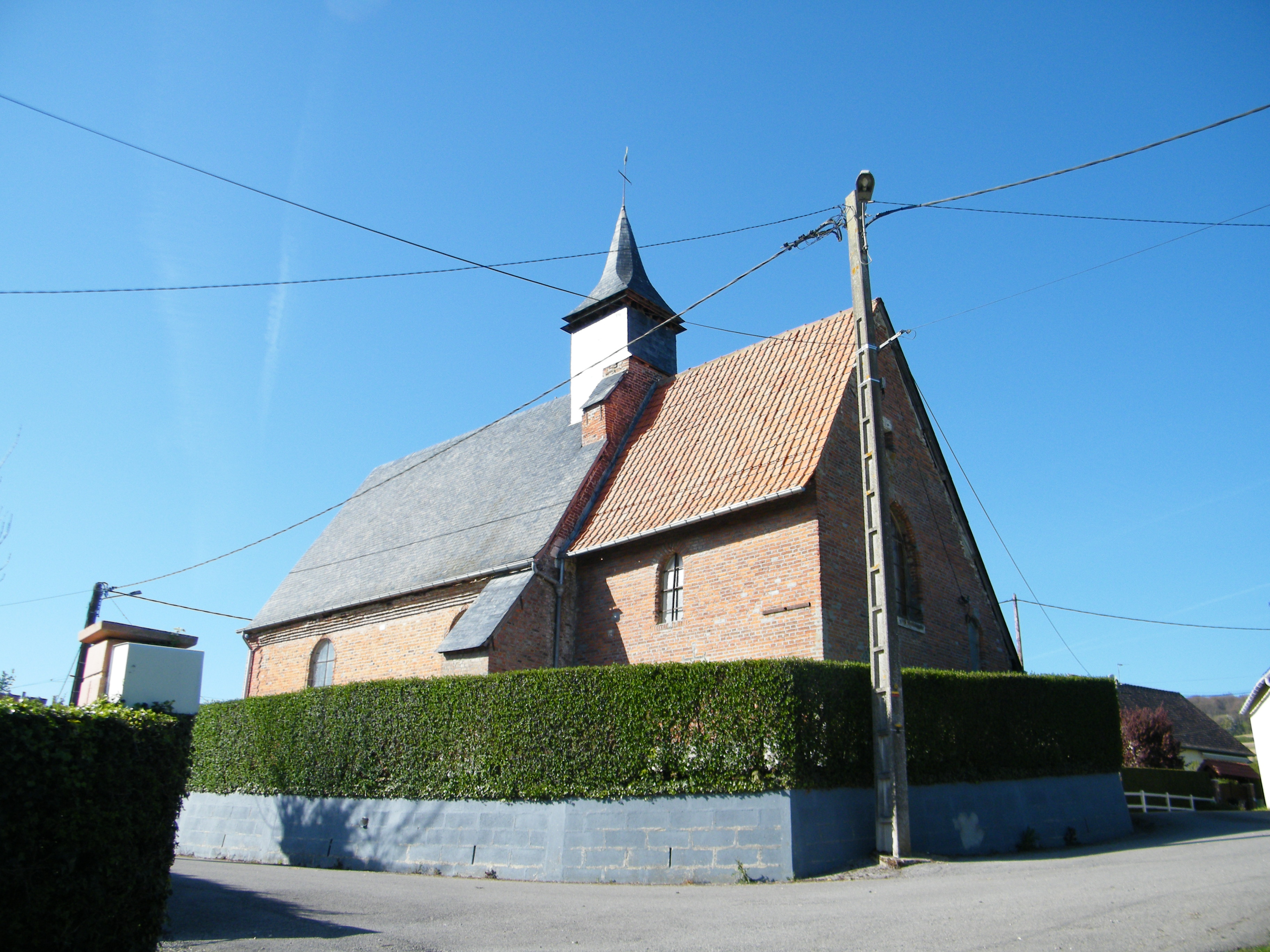
- The church in Neslette
- Location of Neslette
- Location within France Location within Hauts-de-France
- Coordinates: 49°55′28″N 1°39′52″E
- Country: France
- Region: Hauts-de-France
- Department: Somme
- Arrondissement: Amiens
- Canton: Poix-de-Picardie
- Intercommunality: CC Somme Sud-Ouest

Government
  - Mayor (2020–2026): Michèle Lombarey
- Area^{1}: 2.07 km^{2} (0.80 sq mi)
- Elevation: 69 m (226 ft)
- Highest elevation: 171 m (561 ft)
- Lowest elevation: 52 m (171 ft)
- Population (2023): 89
  - Density: 43/km^{2} (110/sq mi)
- Time zone: UTC+01:00 (CET)
  - Summer (DST): UTC+02:00 (CEST)
- INSEE/Postal code: 80587 /80140
- ^{1} French Land Register data, which excludes lakes, ponds, glaciers > 1 km^{2} (0.386 sq mi or 247 acres) and river estuaries.

Neslette (French pronunciation: [nɛlɛt]) is a commune in the Somme department in Hauts-de-France in northern France.

== Geography ==
Neslette is situated on the D1015 road, some 15 miles (24 km) southwest of Abbeville on the banks of the river Bresle, the border with Seine-Maritime.

== Population ==
Historical population
Year	Pop.	±% p.a.
1968	78	—
1975	73	−0.94%
1982	92	+3.36%
1990	85	−0.98%
1999	91	+0.76%
2007	94	+0.41%
2012	91	−0.65%
2017	81	−2.30%
2023	89	+1.58%
Source: INSEE

== See also ==
- Communes of the Somme department
