= Dromesnil =

- Commune
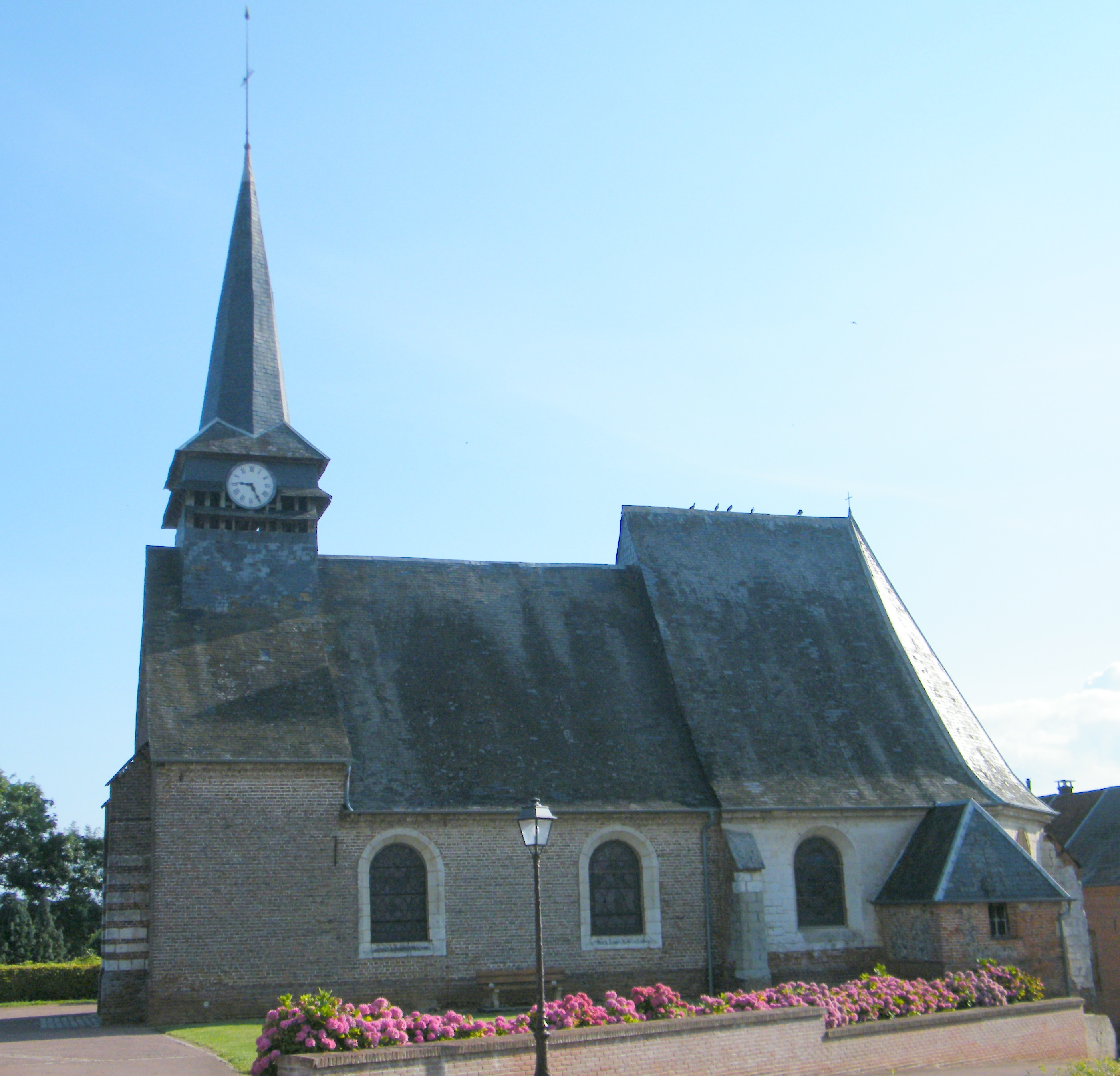
- The church in Dromesnil
- Location of Dromesnil
- Location within France Location within Hauts-de-France
- Coordinates: 49°52′51″N 1°52′09″E
- Country: France
- Region: Hauts-de-France
- Department: Somme
- Arrondissement: Amiens
- Canton: Poix-de-Picardie
- Intercommunality: CC Somme Sud-Ouest

Government
  - Mayor (2020–2026): Lyliane de Saint Germain
- Area^{1}: 5.38 km^{2} (2.08 sq mi)
- Elevation: 67 m (220 ft)
- Highest elevation: 167 m (548 ft)
- Lowest elevation: 79 m (259 ft)
- Population (2023): 82
  - Density: 15/km^{2} (39/sq mi)
- Time zone: UTC+01:00 (CET)
  - Summer (DST): UTC+02:00 (CEST)
- INSEE/Postal code: 80259 /80640
- ^{1} French Land Register data, which excludes lakes, ponds, glaciers > 1 km^{2} (0.386 sq mi or 247 acres) and river estuaries.

Dromesnil (French pronunciation: [dʁɔmenil]; Picard: Dromeni) is a commune in the Somme department in Hauts-de-France in northern France.

== Geography ==
Dromesnil is situated on the D157 road, some 16 miles (26 km) west of Amiens.

== Population ==
Historical population
Year	Pop.	±% p.a.
1968	168	—
1975	121	−4.58%
1982	129	+0.92%
1990	133	+0.38%
1999	121	−1.05%
2007	102	−2.11%
2012	101	−0.20%
2017	94	−1.43%
2023	82	−2.25%
Source: INSEE

== See also ==
- Communes of the Somme department
