= Liomer =

- Commune
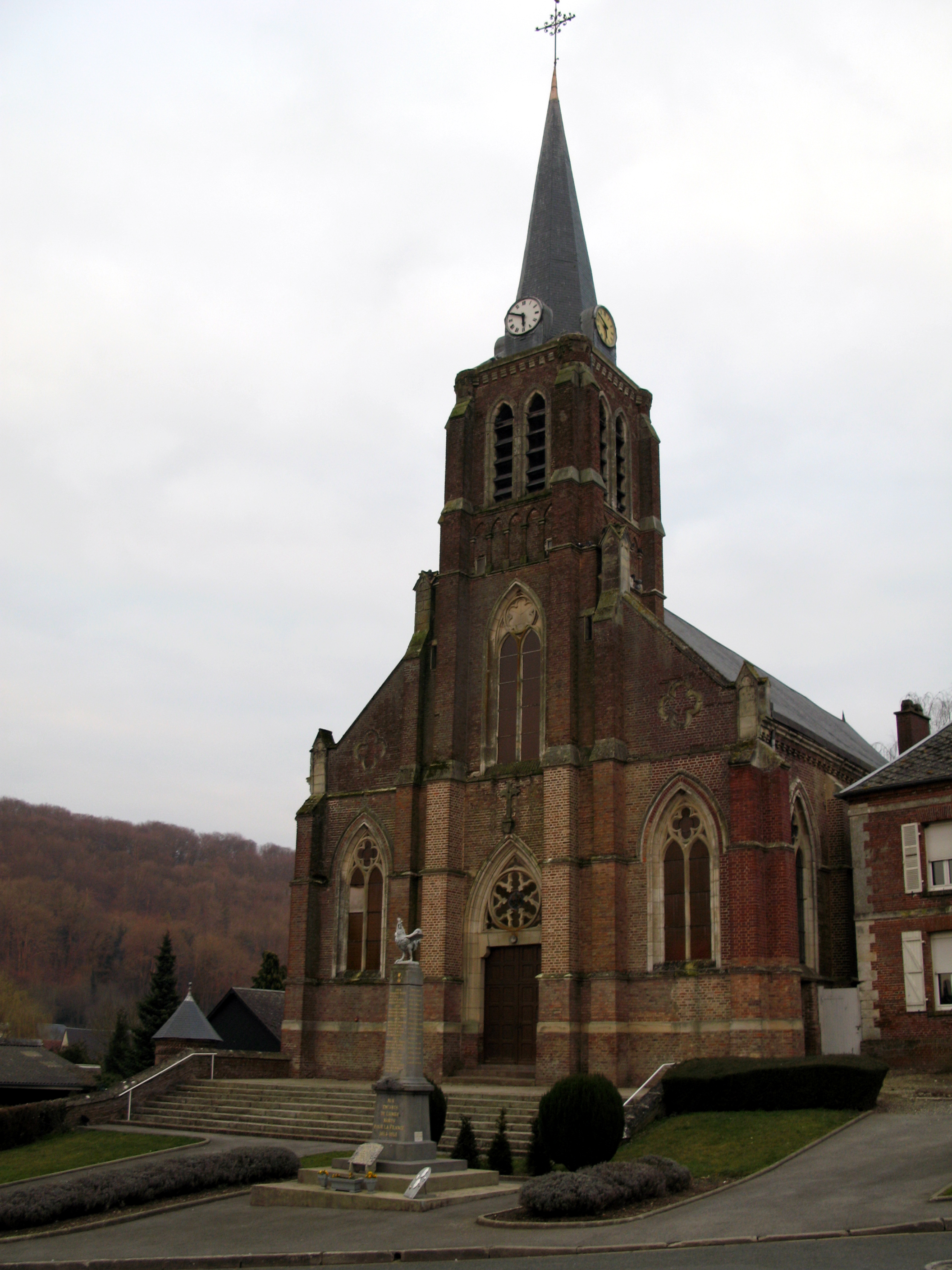
- The church in Liomer

- Coat of arms
- Location of Liomer
- Location within France Location within Hauts-de-France
- Coordinates: 49°51′25″N 1°49′02″E
- Country: France
- Region: Hauts-de-France
- Department: Somme
- Arrondissement: Amiens
- Canton: Poix-de-Picardie
- Intercommunality: CC Somme Sud-Ouest

Government
  - Mayor (2020–2026): Colette Michaux
- Area^{1}: 3.89 km^{2} (1.50 sq mi)
- Elevation: 109 m (358 ft)
- Highest elevation: 180 m (590 ft)
- Lowest elevation: 99 m (325 ft)
- Population (2023): 374
  - Density: 96.1/km^{2} (249/sq mi)
- Time zone: UTC+01:00 (CET)
  - Summer (DST): UTC+02:00 (CEST)
- INSEE/Postal code: 80484 /80430
- ^{1} French Land Register data, which excludes lakes, ponds, glaciers > 1 km^{2} (0.386 sq mi or 247 acres) and river estuaries.

Liomer is a commune in the Somme department in Hauts-de-France in northern France.

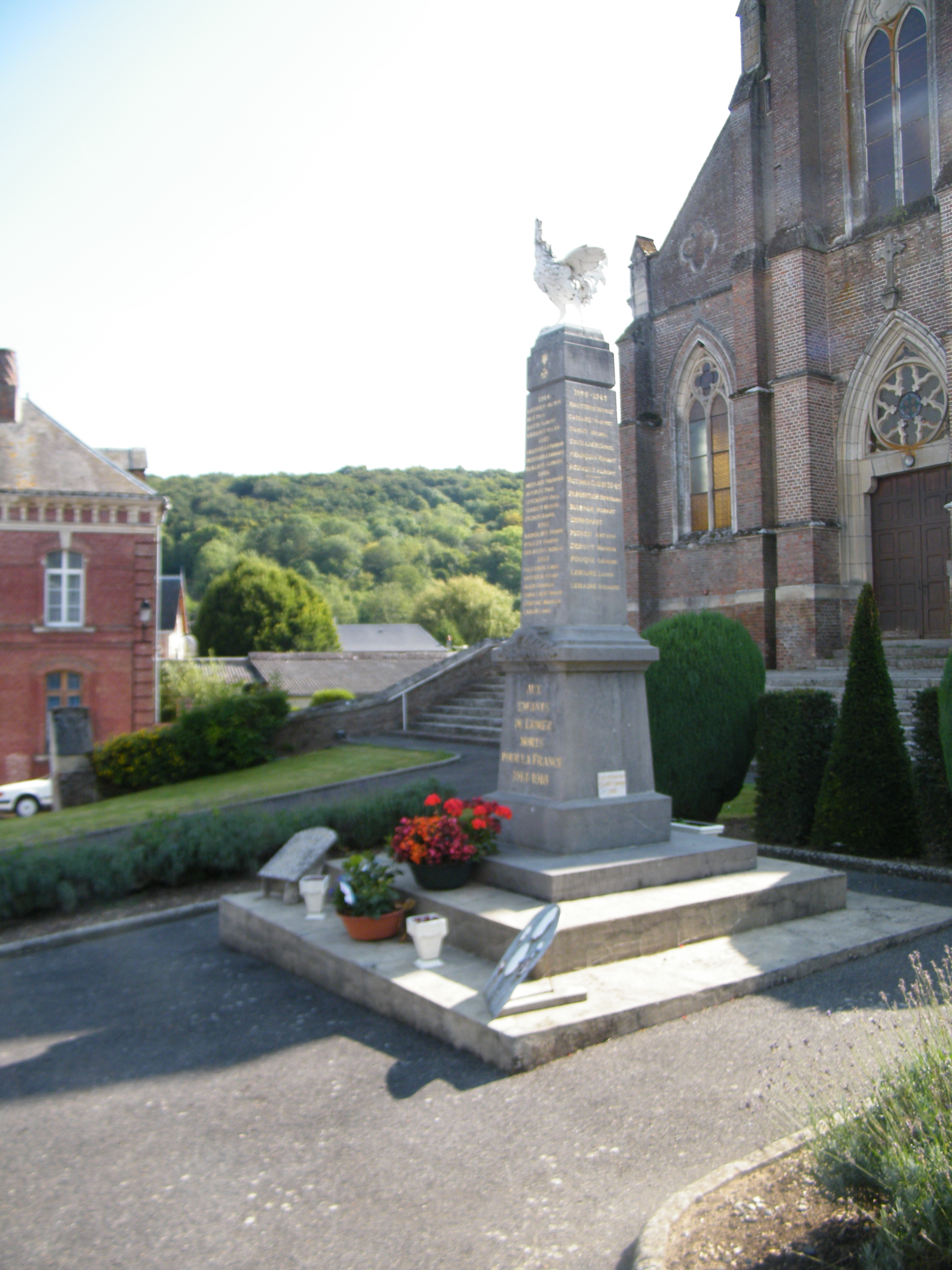
Gallic cockerel and World War I memorial

== Geography ==
Liomer is situated 15 miles (24 km) south of Abbeville, on the D211 road

== Population ==
Historical population
Year	Pop.	±% p.a.
1968	372	—
1975	525	+5.04%
1982	490	−0.98%
1990	360	−3.78%
1999	370	+0.30%
2007	359	−0.38%
2012	408	+2.59%
2017	397	−0.55%
2023	374	−0.99%
Source: INSEE

== See also ==
- Communes of the Somme department
