= Fresnes-Tilloloy =

- Commune
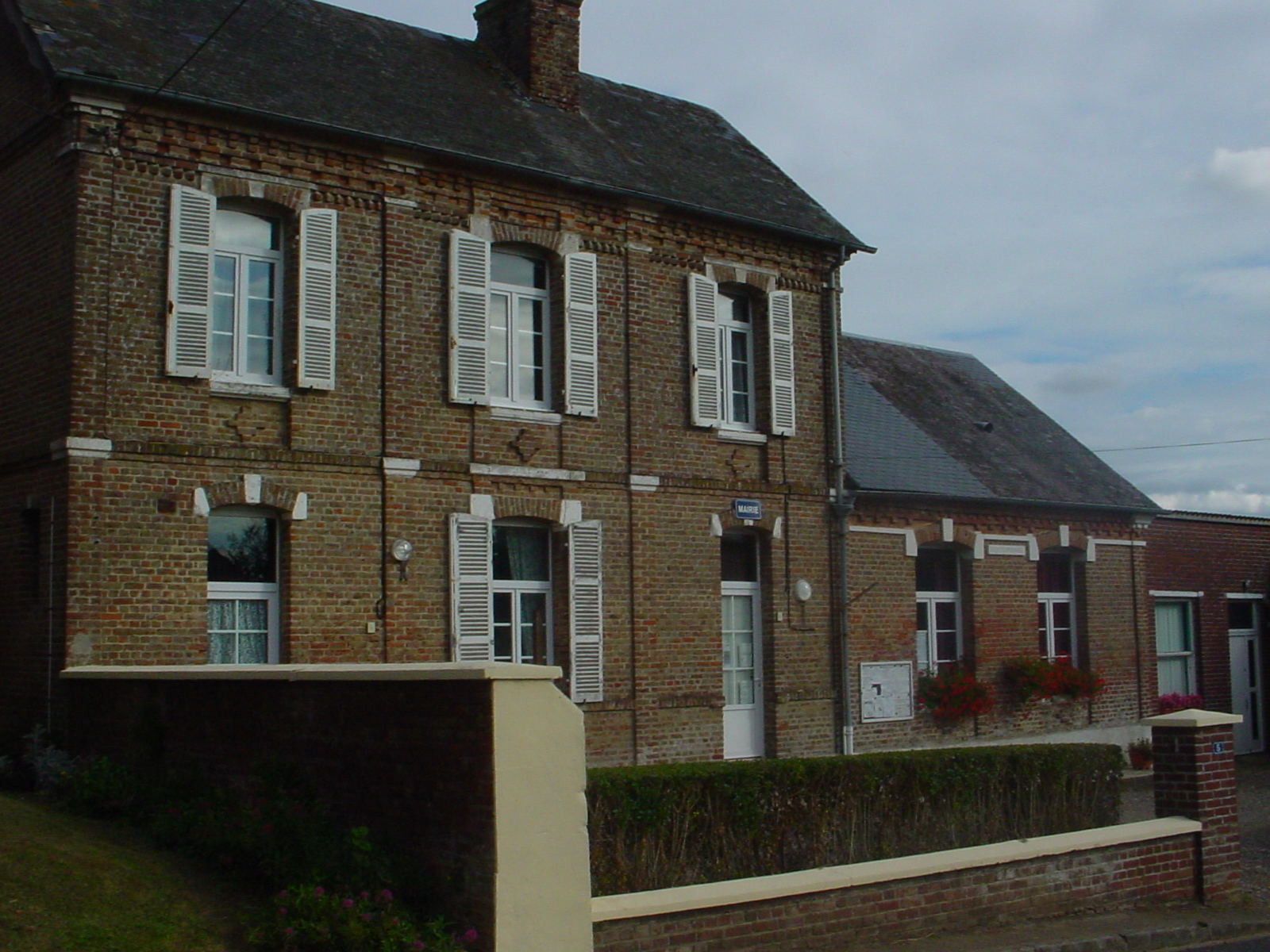
- Town hall
- Location of Fresnes-Tilloloy
- Location within France Location within Hauts-de-France
- Coordinates: 49°59′05″N 1°46′05″E
- Country: France
- Region: Hauts-de-France
- Department: Somme
- Arrondissement: Amiens
- Canton: Poix-de-Picardie
- Intercommunality: CC Somme Sud-Ouest

Government
  - Mayor (2024–2026): Patrice Décamps
- Area^{1}: 3.52 km^{2} (1.36 sq mi)
- Elevation: 115 m (377 ft)
- Highest elevation: 116 m (381 ft)
- Lowest elevation: 89 m (292 ft)
- Population (2023): 211
  - Density: 59.9/km^{2} (155/sq mi)
- Time zone: UTC+01:00 (CET)
  - Summer (DST): UTC+02:00 (CEST)
- INSEE/Postal code: 80354 /80140
- ^{1} French Land Register data, which excludes lakes, ponds, glaciers > 1 km^{2} (0.386 sq mi or 247 acres) and river estuaries.

Fresnes-Tilloloy (also: Fresne-Tilloloy) is a commune in the Somme département in the Hauts-de-France region of France 10 miles (16 km) southwest of Abbeville.

== Population ==
Historical population
Year	Pop.	±% p.a.
1968	134	—
1975	130	−0.43%
1982	134	+0.43%
1990	130	−0.38%
1999	137	+0.58%
2007	131	−0.56%
2012	188	+7.49%
2017	203	+1.55%
2023	211	+0.65%
Source: INSEE

== History ==
The name is derived from the French for the Linden (Limetree) (fr: tilleul) and the Ash (fr: frêne) and reference to the village (as Fresnum) is mentioned in 1207. Tilloloy was also noted in 1373 as Thillolay

Thilloloy and Fresnes were merged into the commune of Fresnes-Tilloloy sometime between 1790 and 1794.

Traces of Gallo-Roman settlement have been found in the area, and the Roman road (the "chaussée de Brunehaut" is nearby

In 1346, Edward III, spent some time there

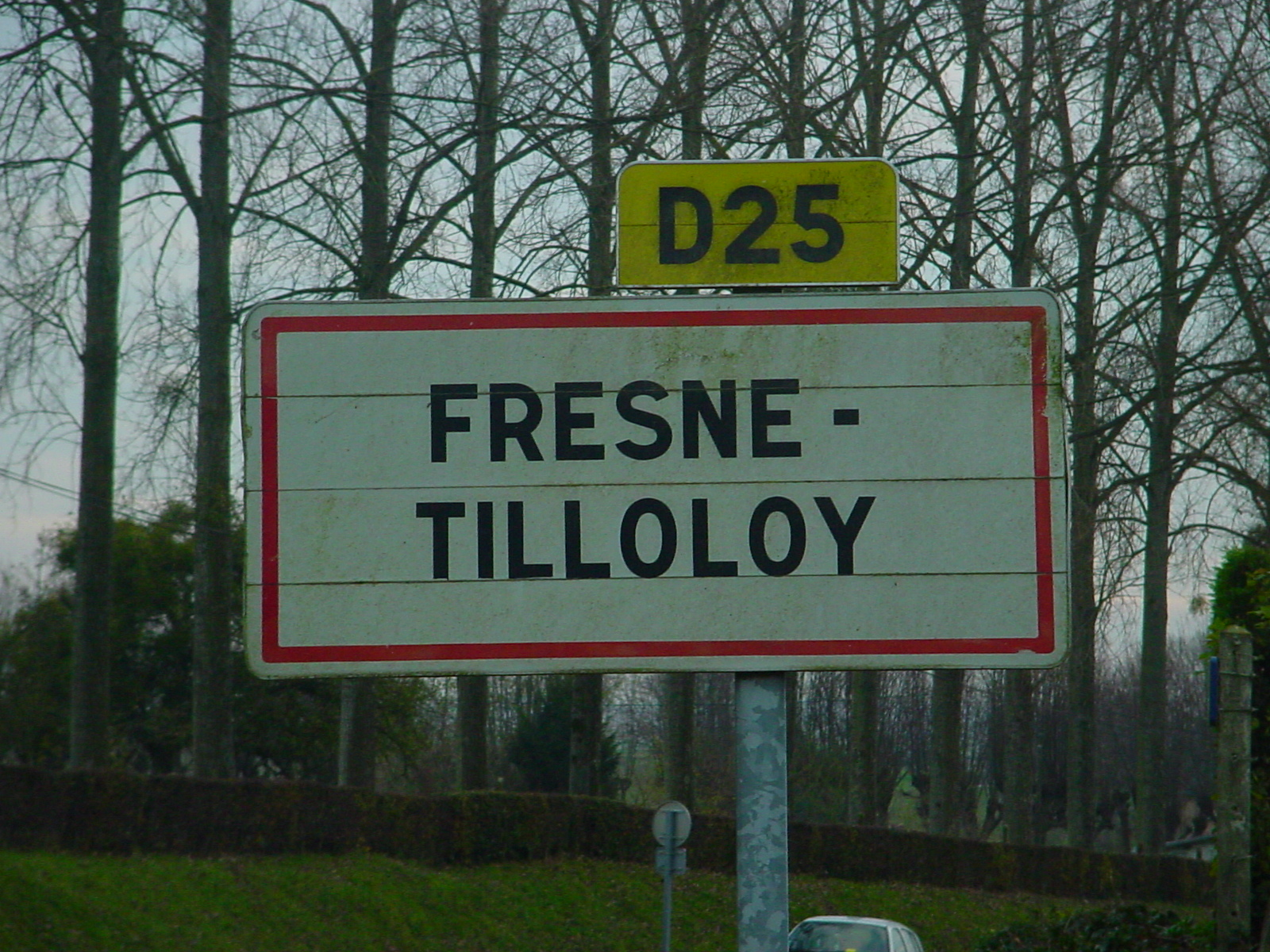

== See also ==
- Communes of the Somme department
