= Villers-Campsart =

- Commune
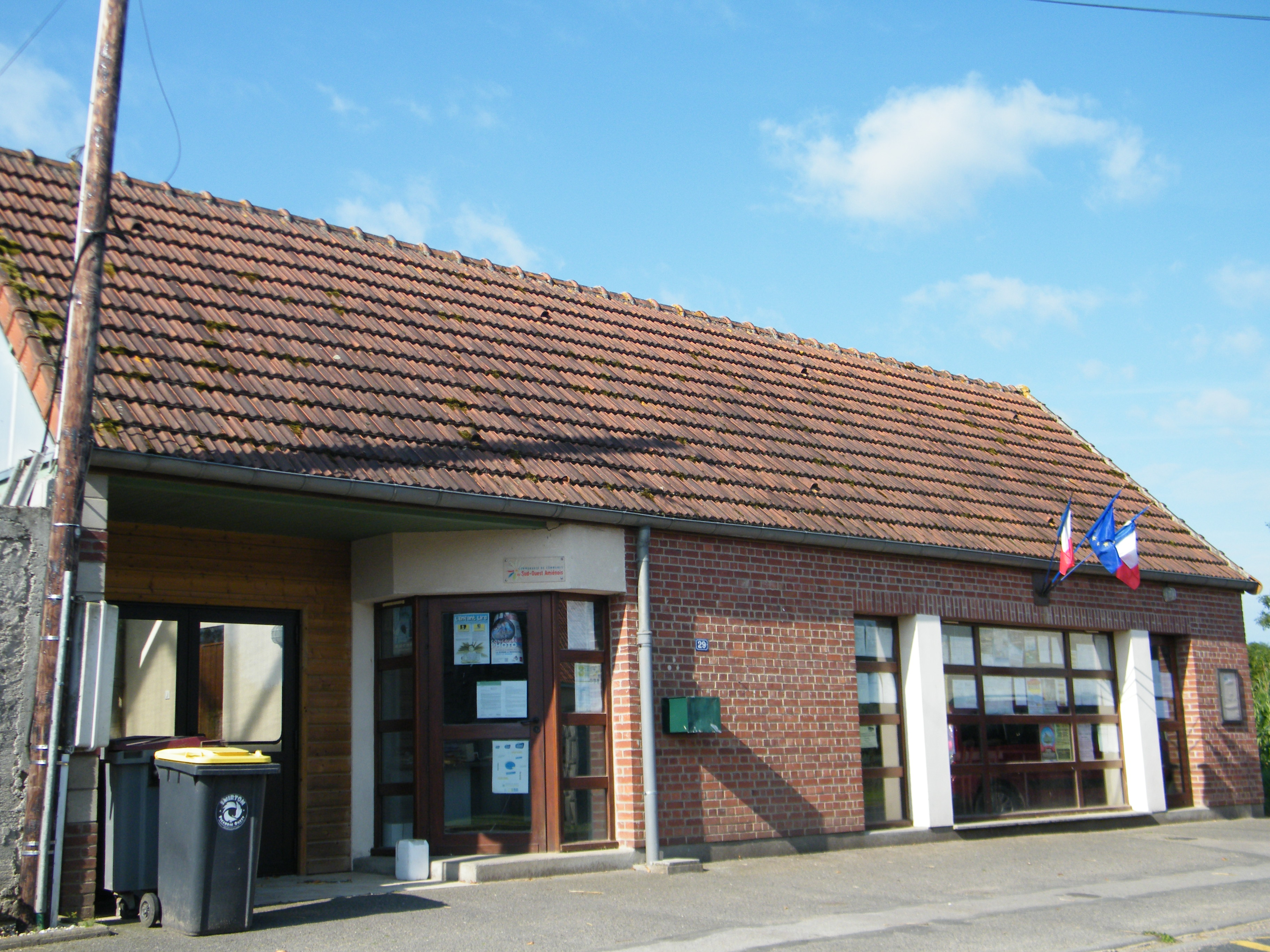
- The town hall in Villers-Campsart
- Location of Villers-Campsart
- Location within France Location within Hauts-de-France
- Coordinates: 49°52′08″N 1°50′09″E
- Country: France
- Region: Hauts-de-France
- Department: Somme
- Arrondissement: Amiens
- Canton: Poix-de-Picardie
- Intercommunality: CC Somme Sud-Ouest

Government
  - Mayor (2020–2026): Philippe Watelain
- Area^{1}: 4.45 km^{2} (1.72 sq mi)
- Elevation: 185 m (607 ft)
- Highest elevation: 176 m (577 ft)
- Lowest elevation: 128 m (420 ft)
- Population (2023): 138
  - Density: 31.0/km^{2} (80.3/sq mi)
- Time zone: UTC+01:00 (CET)
  - Summer (DST): UTC+02:00 (CEST)
- INSEE/Postal code: 80800 /80140
- ^{1} French Land Register data, which excludes lakes, ponds, glaciers > 1 km^{2} (0.386 sq mi or 247 acres) and river estuaries.

Villers-Campsart is a commune in the Somme department in Hauts-de-France in northern France.

== Geography ==
The commune is situated 22(35 km) miles west of Amiens, on the D29 road.

== Population ==
Historical population
Year	Pop.	±% p.a.
1968	163	—
1975	160	−0.27%
1982	121	−3.91%
1990	148	+2.55%
1999	156	+0.59%
2007	157	+0.08%
2012	128	−4.00%
2017	152	+3.50%
2023	138	−1.60%
Source: INSEE

== See also ==
- Communes of the Somme department
