= Cannessières =

- Commune
- Location of Cannessières
- Location within France Location within Hauts-de-France
- Coordinates: 49°56′23″N 1°45′53″E
- Country: France
- Region: Hauts-de-France
- Department: Somme
- Arrondissement: Amiens
- Canton: Poix-de-Picardie
- Intercommunality: CC Somme Sud-Ouest

Government
  - Mayor (2020–2026): Xavier Henquenet
- Area^{1}: 3.75 km^{2} (1.45 sq mi)
- Elevation: 119 m (390 ft)
- Highest elevation: 141 m (463 ft)
- Lowest elevation: 85 m (279 ft)
- Population (2023): 59
  - Density: 16/km^{2} (41/sq mi)
- Time zone: UTC+01:00 (CET)
  - Summer (DST): UTC+02:00 (CEST)
- INSEE/Postal code: 80169 /80140
- ^{1} French Land Register data, which excludes lakes, ponds, glaciers > 1 km^{2} (0.386 sq mi or 247 acres) and river estuaries.

Cannessières (Picard: Tchènessière) is a commune in the Somme department in Hauts-de-France in northern France.

== Geography ==
The commune is situated on the D195 road, some 16 miles (26 km) south-southwest of Abbeville.

== Population ==
Historical population
Year	Pop.	±% p.a.
1968	116	—
1975	103	−1.68%
1982	111	+1.07%
1990	95	−1.93%
1999	85	−1.23%
2007	78	−1.07%
2012	84	+1.49%
2017	70	−3.58%
2023	59	−2.81%
Source: INSEE

== See also ==
- Communes of the Somme department
