= Épaumesnil =

- Commune
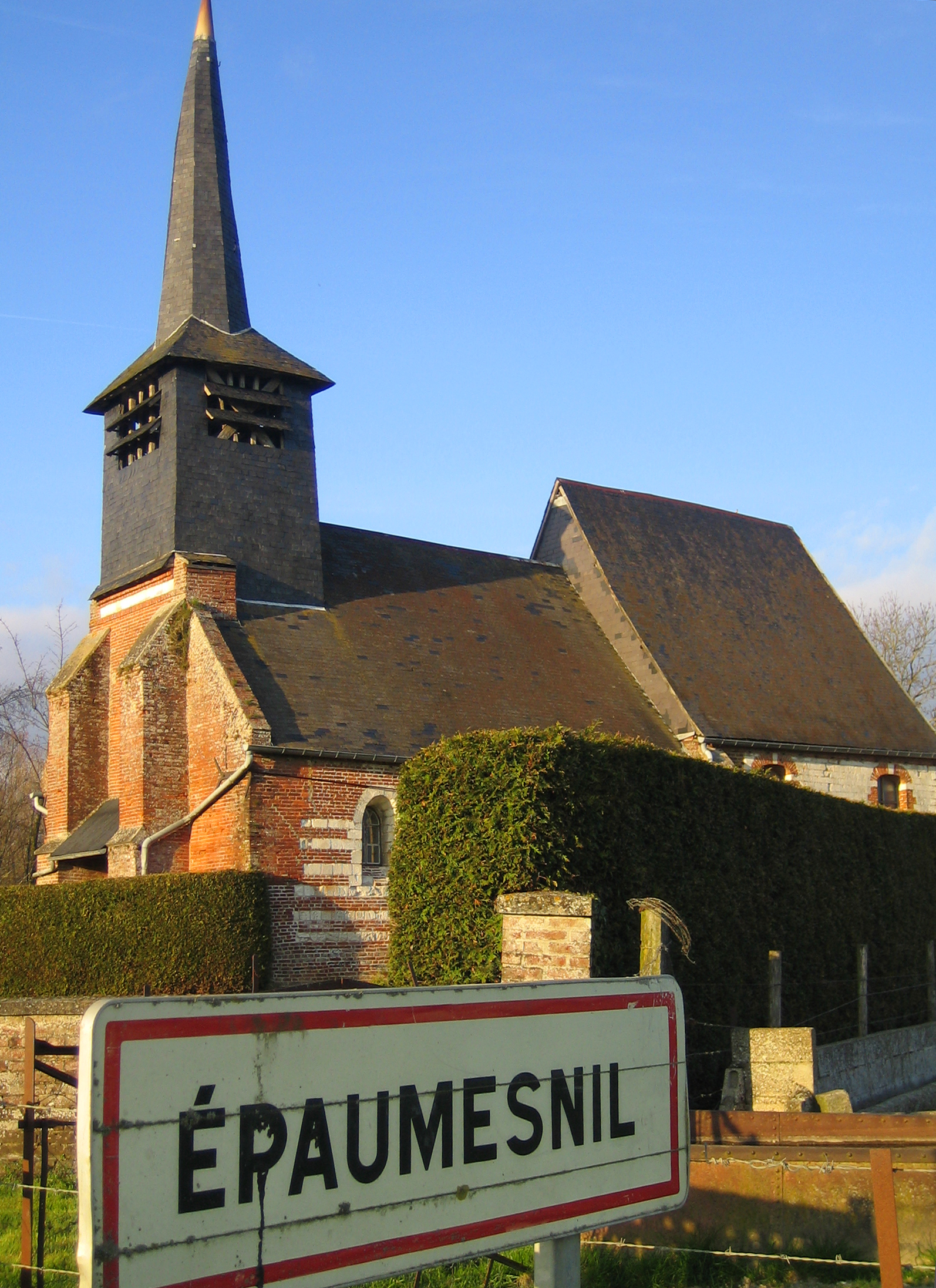
- The church
- Location of Épaumesnil
- Location within France Location within Hauts-de-France
- Coordinates: 49°54′46″N 1°51′13″E
- Country: France
- Region: Hauts-de-France
- Department: Somme
- Arrondissement: Amiens
- Canton: Poix-de-Picardie
- Intercommunality: CC Somme Sud-Ouest

Government
  - Mayor (2020–2026): André Simon
- Area^{1}: 4.74 km^{2} (1.83 sq mi)
- Elevation: 60 m (200 ft)
- Highest elevation: 129 m (423 ft)
- Lowest elevation: 68 m (223 ft)
- Population (2023): 104
  - Density: 21.9/km^{2} (56.8/sq mi)
- Time zone: UTC+01:00 (CET)
  - Summer (DST): UTC+02:00 (CEST)
- INSEE/Postal code: 80269 /80140
- ^{1} French Land Register data, which excludes lakes, ponds, glaciers > 1 km^{2} (0.386 sq mi or 247 acres) and river estuaries.

Épaumesnil (French pronunciation: [epomɛnil]; Picard: Épeuméni ) is a commune in the Somme department in Hauts-de-France in northern France.

== Geography ==
Épaumesnil is situated on the D96 road, some 37 km (23 mi) west of Amiens.

== Population ==
Historical population
Year	Pop.	±% p.a.
1968	117	—
1975	119	+0.24%
1982	109	−1.25%
1990	119	+1.10%
1999	107	−1.17%
2007	116	+1.01%
2012	126	+1.67%
2017	133	+1.09%
2023	104	−4.02%
Source: INSEE

== See also ==
- Communes of the Somme department
