= Saint-Aubin-Rivière =

- Commune
- The Liger river

- Coat of arms
- Location of Saint-Aubin-Rivière
- Location within France Location within Hauts-de-France
- Coordinates: 49°52′14″N 1°46′31″E
- Country: France
- Region: Hauts-de-France
- Department: Somme
- Arrondissement: Amiens
- Canton: Poix-de-Picardie
- Intercommunality: CC Somme Sud-Ouest

Government
  - Mayor (2020–2026): Denis Lejeune
- Area^{1}: 3.08 km^{2} (1.19 sq mi)
- Elevation: 126 m (413 ft)
- Highest elevation: 188 m (617 ft)
- Lowest elevation: 87 m (285 ft)
- Population (2023): 116
  - Density: 37.7/km^{2} (97.5/sq mi)
- Time zone: UTC+01:00 (CET)
  - Summer (DST): UTC+02:00 (CEST)
- INSEE/Postal code: 80699 /80430
- ^{1} French Land Register data, which excludes lakes, ponds, glaciers > 1 km^{2} (0.386 sq mi or 247 acres) and river estuaries.

Saint-Aubin-Rivière (French pronunciation: [sɛ̃.t‿obɛ̃ ʁivjɛʁ]) is a commune in the Somme department in Hauts-de-France in northern France.

== Geography ==
The commune is situated some 14 miles (23 km) south of Abbeville, on the D211 road and on the banks of the river Liger.

== Population ==
Historical population
Year	Pop.	±% p.a.
1968	173	—
1975	113	−5.90%
1982	125	+1.45%
1990	123	−0.20%
1999	113	−0.94%
2007	113	+0.00%
2012	112	−0.18%
2017	111	−0.18%
2023	116	+0.74%
Source: INSEE

== Places of interest ==
- The church
- The watermill

== See also ==
- Communes of the Somme department
