= Moyencourt-lès-Poix =

- Commune
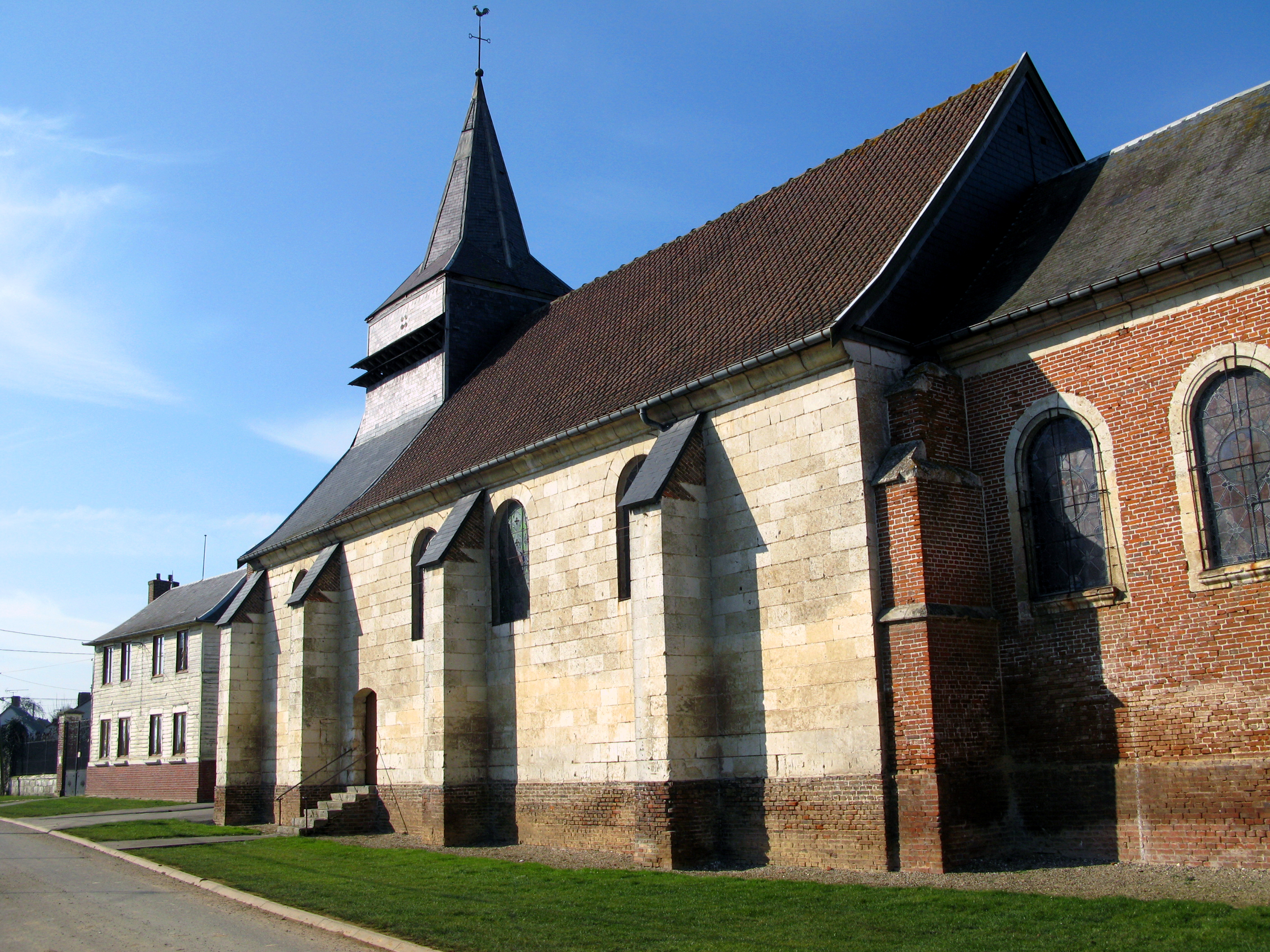
- The church in Moyencourt-lès-Poix

- Coat of arms
- Location of Moyencourt-lès-Poix
- Location within France Location within Hauts-de-France
- Coordinates: 49°48′12″N 2°02′10″E
- Country: France
- Region: Hauts-de-France
- Department: Somme
- Arrondissement: Amiens
- Canton: Poix-de-Picardie
- Intercommunality: CC Somme Sud-Ouest

Government
  - Mayor (2020–2026): Jean-Pierre Demarquet
- Area^{1}: 10.45 km^{2} (4.03 sq mi)
- Elevation: 160 m (520 ft)
- Highest elevation: 177 m (581 ft)
- Lowest elevation: 104 m (341 ft)
- Population (2023): 165
  - Density: 15.8/km^{2} (40.9/sq mi)
- Time zone: UTC+01:00 (CET)
  - Summer (DST): UTC+02:00 (CEST)
- INSEE/Postal code: 80577 /80290
- ^{1} French Land Register data, which excludes lakes, ponds, glaciers > 1 km^{2} (0.386 sq mi or 247 acres) and river estuaries.

Moyencourt-lès-Poix (French pronunciation: [mwajɛ̃kuʁ lɛ pwa], literally Moyencourt near Poix) is a commune in the Somme department in Hauts-de-France in northern France.

== Geography ==
The commune is situated just off the N29, on the D94 road, some 15 miles (24 km) southwest of Amiens. Not to be confused with another commune, Moyencourt, further east in the same département.

== Population ==
Historical population
Year	Pop.	±% p.a.
1968	153	—
1975	171	+1.60%
1982	172	+0.08%
1990	159	−0.98%
1999	159	+0.00%
2007	161	+0.16%
2012	166	+0.61%
2017	181	+1.75%
2023	165	−1.53%
Source: INSEE

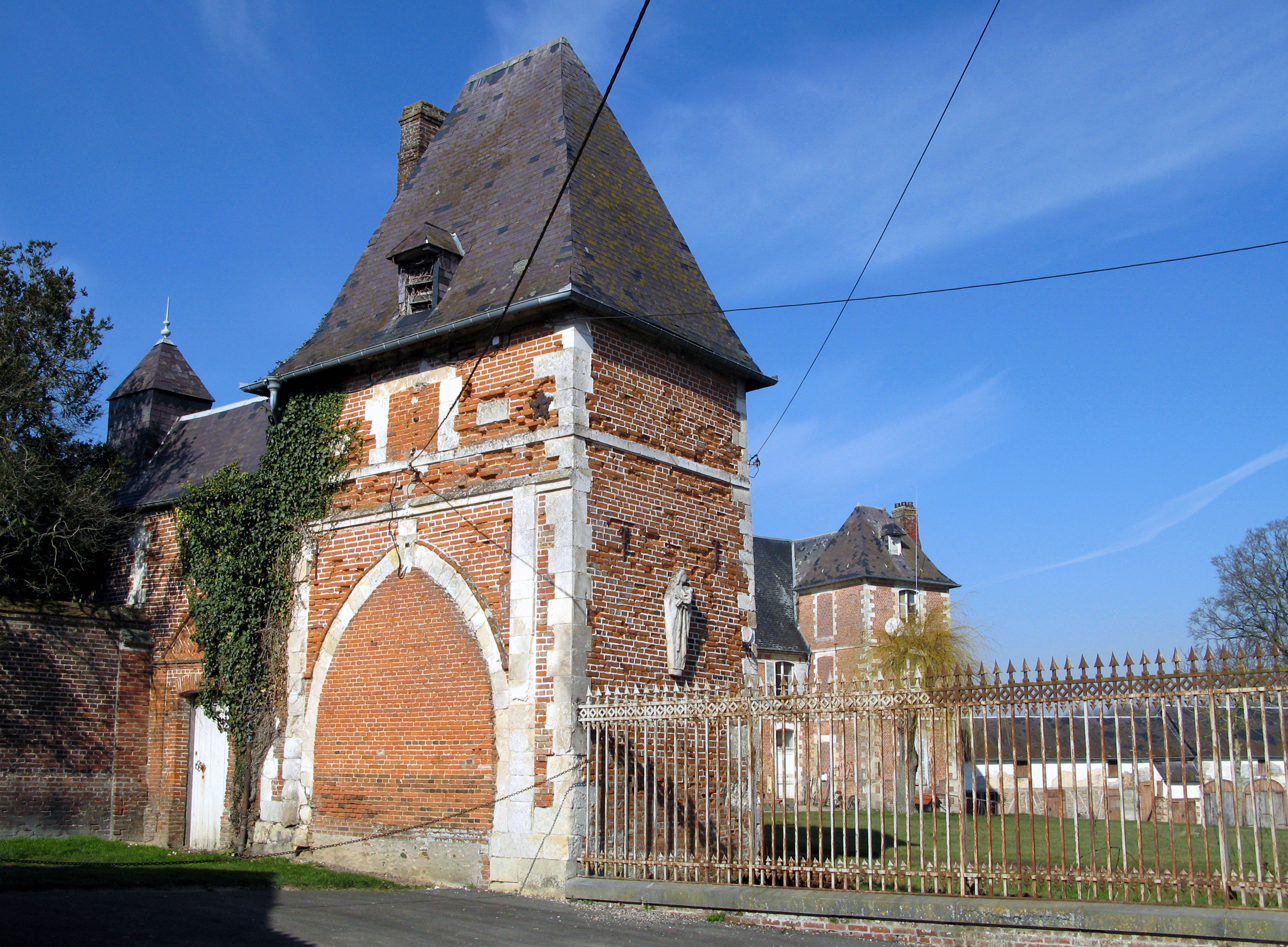
The Chateau pavillon

== See also ==
- Communes of the Somme department
