= Forceville-en-Vimeu =

- Commune
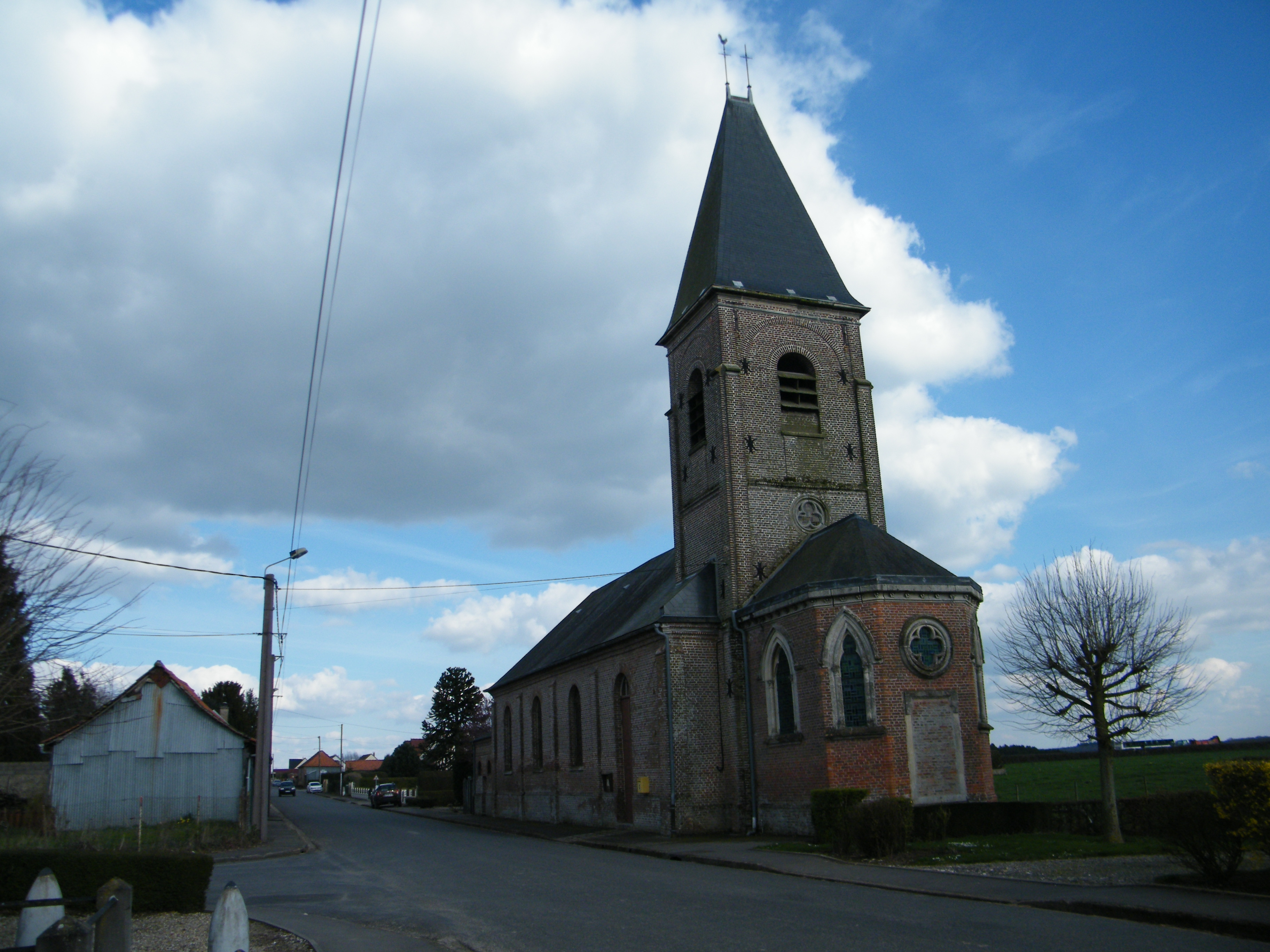
- The church in Forceville-en-Vimeu

- Coat of arms
- Location of Forceville-en-Vimeu
- Location within France Location within Hauts-de-France
- Coordinates: 49°57′58″N 1°48′05″E
- Country: France
- Region: Hauts-de-France
- Department: Somme
- Arrondissement: Amiens
- Canton: Poix-de-Picardie
- Intercommunality: CC Somme Sud-Ouest

Government
  - Mayor (2020–2026): Philippe Dubos
- Area^{1}: 2.97 km^{2} (1.15 sq mi)
- Elevation: 108 m (354 ft)
- Highest elevation: 119 m (390 ft)
- Lowest elevation: 72 m (236 ft)
- Population (2023): 226
  - Density: 76.1/km^{2} (197/sq mi)
- Time zone: UTC+01:00 (CET)
  - Summer (DST): UTC+02:00 (CEST)
- INSEE/Postal code: 80330 /80140
- ^{1} French Land Register data, which excludes lakes, ponds, glaciers > 1 km^{2} (0.386 sq mi or 247 acres) and river estuaries.

Forceville-en-Vimeu (French pronunciation: [fɔʁsəvil ɑ̃ vimø]; Picard: Feurville-in-Vimeu) is a commune in the Somme department in Hauts-de-France in northern France.

== Geography ==
The commune is situated on the D53 road, some 14 miles (23 km) south of Abbeville.

== Population ==
Historical population
| Year | Pop. | ±% p.a. |
|---|---|---|
| 1968 | 310 | — |
| 1975 | 306 | −0.19% |
| 1982 | 279 | −1.31% |
| 1990 | 261 | −0.83% |
| 1999 | 262 | +0.04% |
| 2007 | 269 | +0.33% |
| 2012 | 252 | −1.30% |
| 2017 | 238 | −1.14% |
| 2023 | 226 | −0.86% |
Source: INSEE

== Places of interest ==
- 17th-century château
- Disused railway line
- The ‘Forcefil’ factory, that makes thread for rugs and carpets

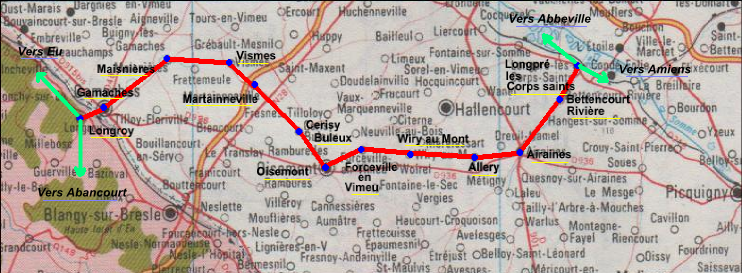
Map of the old railway

== See also ==
- Communes of the Somme department
