= Framicourt =

- Commune
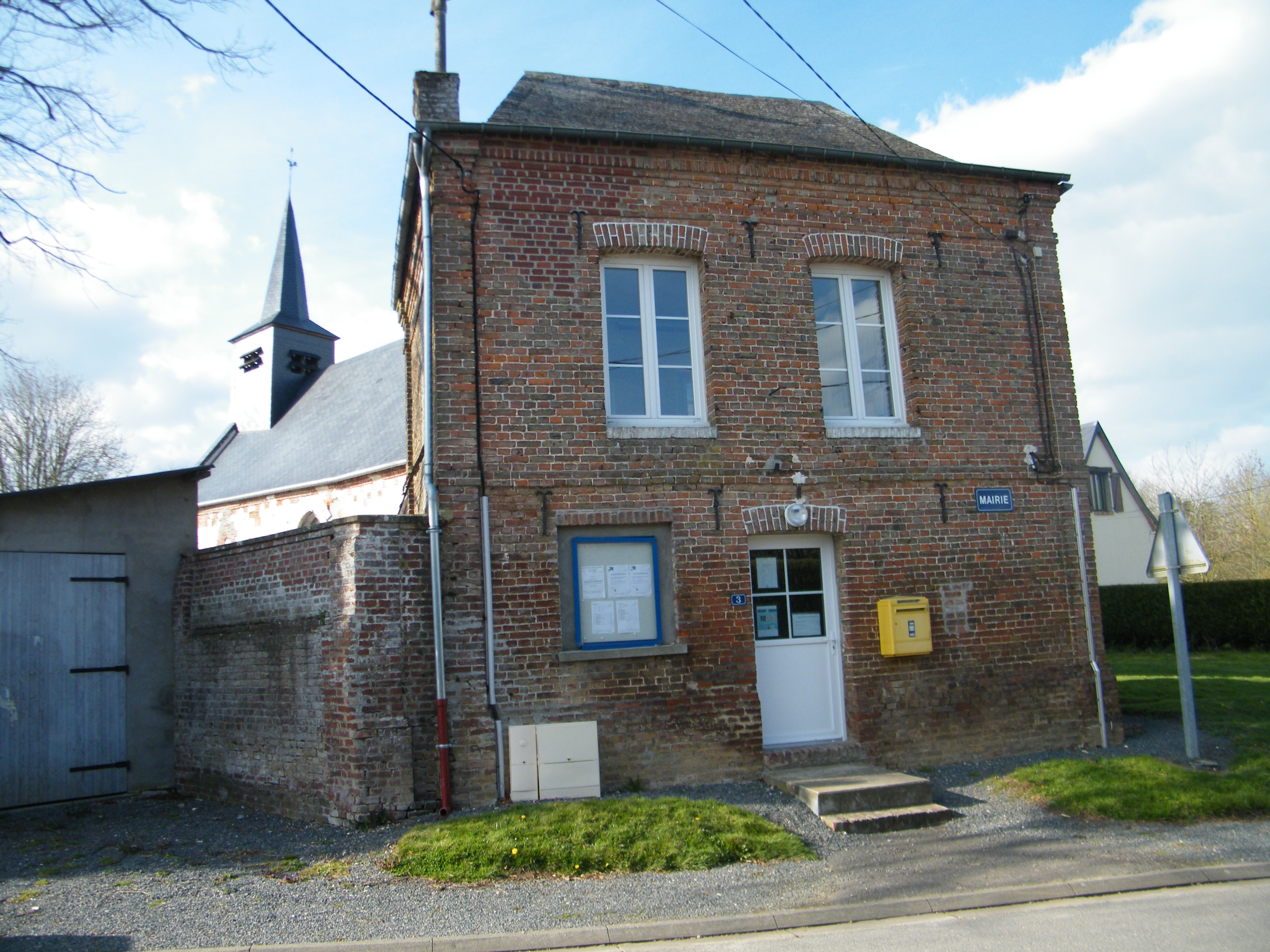
- The town hall in Framicourt
- Location of Framicourt
- Location within France Location within Hauts-de-France
- Coordinates: 49°57′27″N 1°40′28″E
- Country: France
- Region: Hauts-de-France
- Department: Somme
- Arrondissement: Amiens
- Canton: Poix-de-Picardie
- Intercommunality: CC Somme Sud-Ouest

Government
  - Mayor (2020–2026): Sylvie Ducrocq
- Area^{1}: 5.02 km^{2} (1.94 sq mi)
- Elevation: 130 m (430 ft)
- Highest elevation: 166 m (545 ft)
- Lowest elevation: 119 m (390 ft)
- Population (2023): 151
  - Density: 30.1/km^{2} (77.9/sq mi)
- Time zone: UTC+01:00 (CET)
  - Summer (DST): UTC+02:00 (CEST)
- INSEE/Postal code: 80343 /80140
- ^{1} French Land Register data, which excludes lakes, ponds, glaciers > 1 km^{2} (0.386 sq mi or 247 acres) and river estuaries.

Framicourt (French pronunciation: [fʁamikuʁ]) is a commune in the Somme department in Hauts-de-France in northern France.

== Geography ==
Framicourt is situated on the D928 road, two miles from the river Bresle, the départemental border with Seine-Maritime and some 16 miles (26 km) southwest of Abbeville.

== Population ==
Historical population
Year	Pop.	±% p.a.
1968	137	—
1975	117	−2.23%
1982	102	−1.94%
1990	106	+0.48%
1999	151	+4.01%
2007	157	+0.49%
2012	190	+3.89%
2017	176	−1.52%
2023	151	−2.52%
Source: INSEE

== See also ==
- Communes of the Somme department
