= Le Mazis =

- Commune
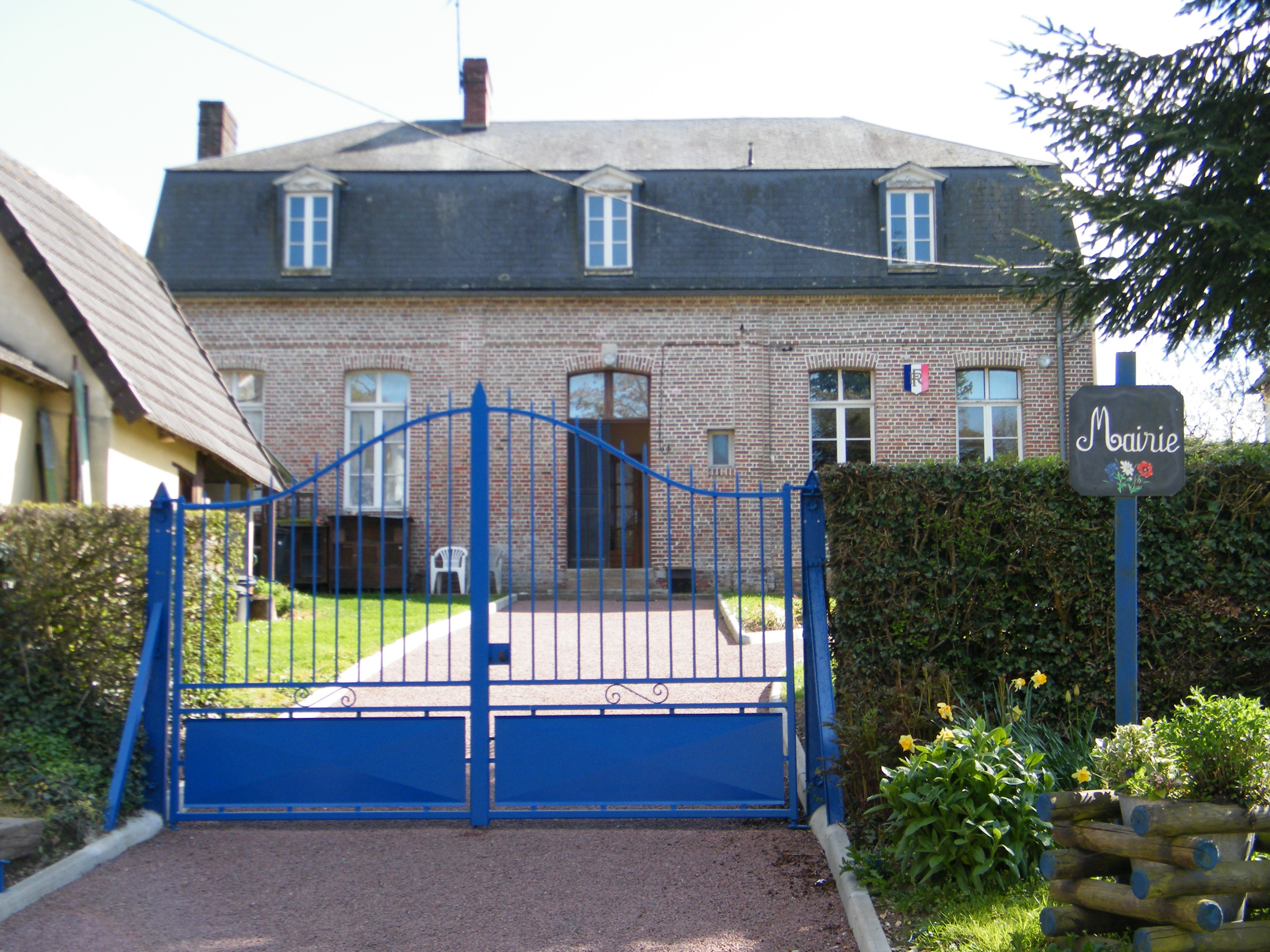
- The town hall in Le Mazis
- Location of Le Mazis
- Location within France Location within Hauts-de-France
- Coordinates: 49°52′41″N 1°46′23″E
- Country: France
- Region: Hauts-de-France
- Department: Somme
- Arrondissement: Amiens
- Canton: Poix-de-Picardie
- Intercommunality: CC Somme Sud-Ouest

Government
  - Mayor (2020–2026): Marie-Elisabeth Escard
- Area^{1}: 3.8 km^{2} (1.5 sq mi)
- Elevation: 128 m (420 ft)
- Highest elevation: 192 m (630 ft)
- Lowest elevation: 81 m (266 ft)
- Population (2023): 107
  - Density: 28/km^{2} (73/sq mi)
- Time zone: UTC+01:00 (CET)
  - Summer (DST): UTC+02:00 (CEST)
- INSEE/Postal code: 80522 /80430
- ^{1} French Land Register data, which excludes lakes, ponds, glaciers > 1 km^{2} (0.386 sq mi or 247 acres) and river estuaries.

Le Mazis (French pronunciation: [lə mazi]; Picard: Èl Mazi) is a commune in the Somme department in Hauts-de-France in northern France.

== Geography ==
Le Mazis is situated on the D211 road, some 20 miles (32 km) south of Abbeville.

== Population ==
Historical population
Year	Pop.	±% p.a.
1968	98	—
1975	84	−2.18%
1982	94	+1.62%
1990	91	−0.40%
1999	97	+0.71%
2007	94	−0.39%
2012	108	+2.82%
2017	106	−0.37%
2023	107	+0.16%
Source: INSEE

== See also ==
- Communes of the Somme department
