= Saint-Germain-sur-Bresle =

- Commune
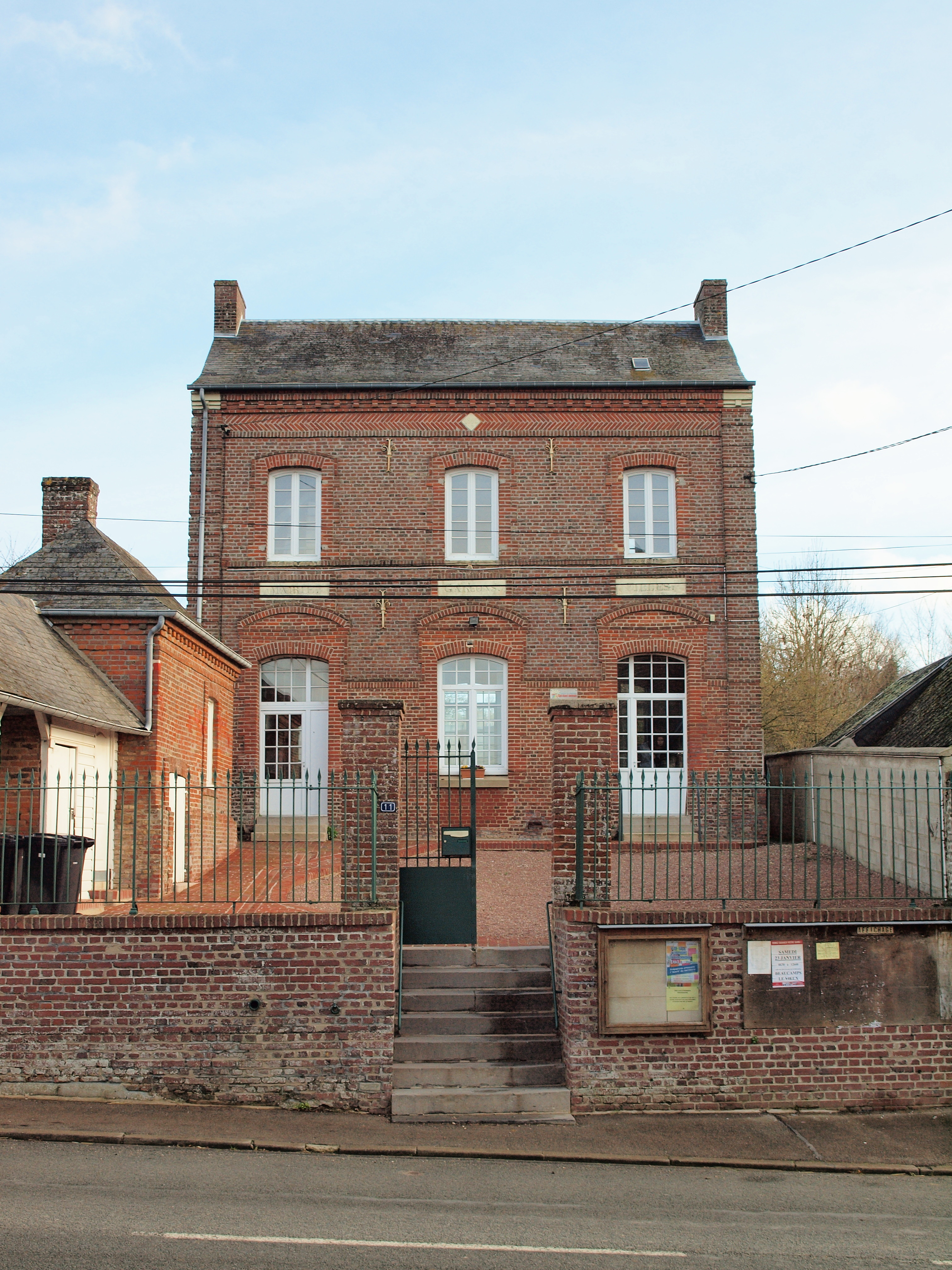
- The town hall in Saint-Germain-sur-Bresle
- Location of Saint-Germain-sur-Bresle
- Location within France Location within Hauts-de-France
- Coordinates: 49°49′51″N 1°44′02″E
- Country: France
- Region: Hauts-de-France
- Department: Somme
- Arrondissement: Amiens
- Canton: Poix-de-Picardie
- Intercommunality: CC Somme Sud-Ouest

Government
  - Mayor (2020–2026): Michel Cordier
- Area^{1}: 8.69 km^{2} (3.36 sq mi)
- Elevation: 121 m (397 ft)
- Highest elevation: 208 m (682 ft)
- Lowest elevation: 83 m (272 ft)
- Population (2023): 224
  - Density: 25.8/km^{2} (66.8/sq mi)
- Time zone: UTC+01:00 (CET)
  - Summer (DST): UTC+02:00 (CEST)
- INSEE/Postal code: 80703 /80430
- ^{1} French Land Register data, which excludes lakes, ponds, glaciers > 1 km^{2} (0.386 sq mi or 247 acres) and river estuaries.

Saint-Germain-sur-Bresle (French pronunciation: [sɛ̃ ʒɛʁmɛ̃ syʁ bʁɛl], literally Saint-Germain on Bresle) is a commune in the Somme department in Hauts-de-France in northern France.

== Geography ==
The commune is situated 16 miles (26 km) south of Abbeville, on the D316 road and by the banks of the river Bresle.

== Population ==
Historical population
Year	Pop.	±% p.a.
1968	185	—
1975	202	+1.26%
1982	203	+0.07%
1990	167	−2.41%
1999	185	+1.14%
2007	176	−0.62%
2012	210	+3.60%
2017	206	−0.38%
2023	224	+1.41%
Source: INSEE

== See also ==
- Communes of the Somme department
