= Avesnes-Chaussoy =

- Commune
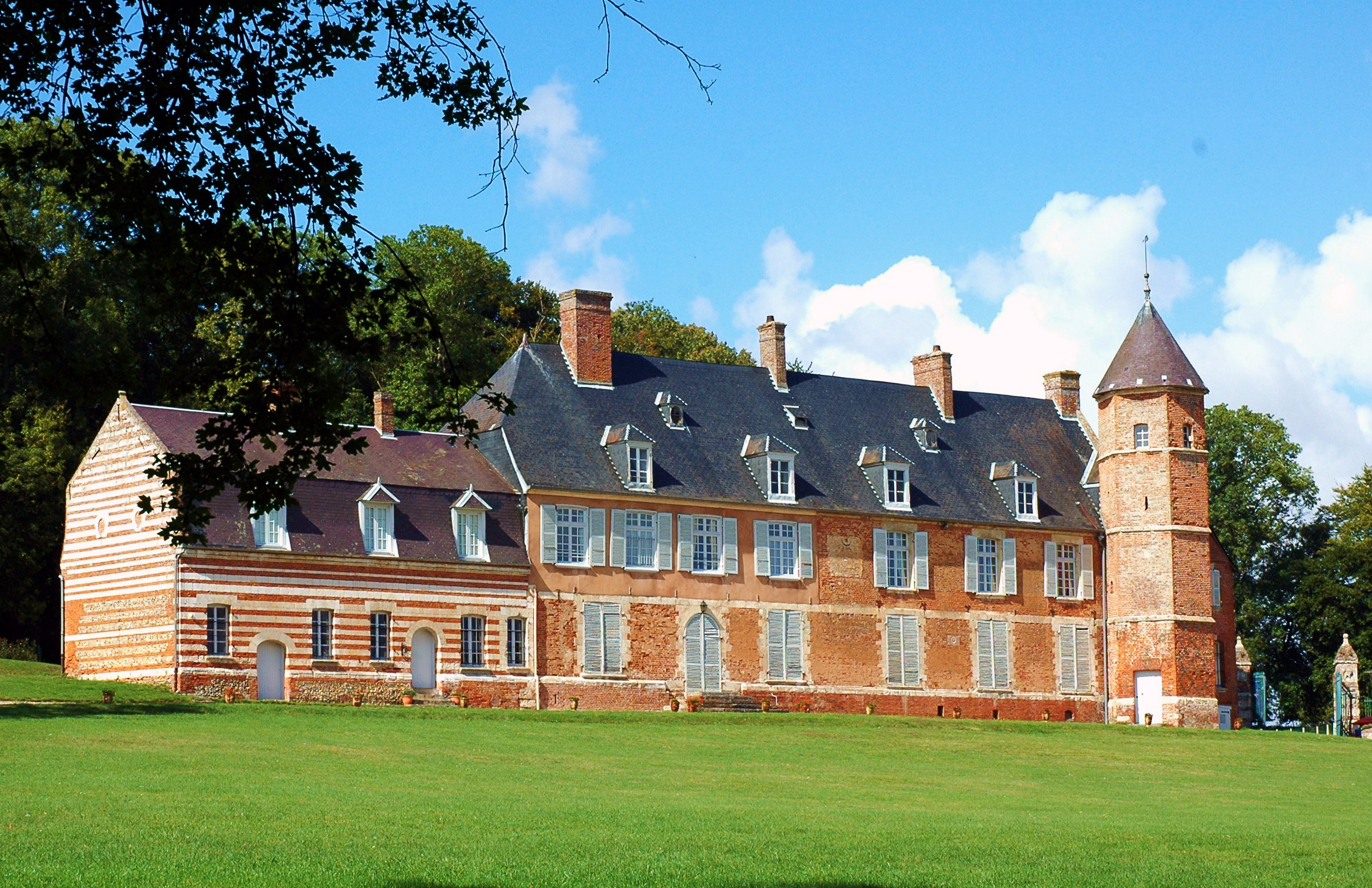
- The château of Avesnes
- Location of Avesnes-Chaussoy
- Location within France Location within Hauts-de-France
- Coordinates: 49°54′09″N 1°52′29″E
- Country: France
- Region: Hauts-de-France
- Department: Somme
- Arrondissement: Amiens
- Canton: Poix-de-Picardie
- Intercommunality: CC Somme Sud-Ouest

Government
  - Mayor (2024–2026): Marc-Antoine Leclercq
- Area^{1}: 6.12 km^{2} (2.36 sq mi)
- Elevation: 99 m (325 ft)
- Highest elevation: 147 m (482 ft)
- Lowest elevation: 74 m (243 ft)
- Population (2023): 63
  - Density: 10/km^{2} (27/sq mi)
- Time zone: UTC+01:00 (CET)
  - Summer (DST): UTC+02:00 (CEST)
- INSEE/Postal code: 80048 /80140
- ^{1} French Land Register data, which excludes lakes, ponds, glaciers > 1 km^{2} (0.386 sq mi or 247 acres) and river estuaries.

Avesnes-Chaussoy (French pronunciation: [avɛn ʃoswa]; Picard: Aveinnes-Cheuchoy) is a commune in the Somme department in Hauts-de-France in northern France.

== See also ==
- Communes of the Somme department
