= Saint-Maulvis =

- Commune
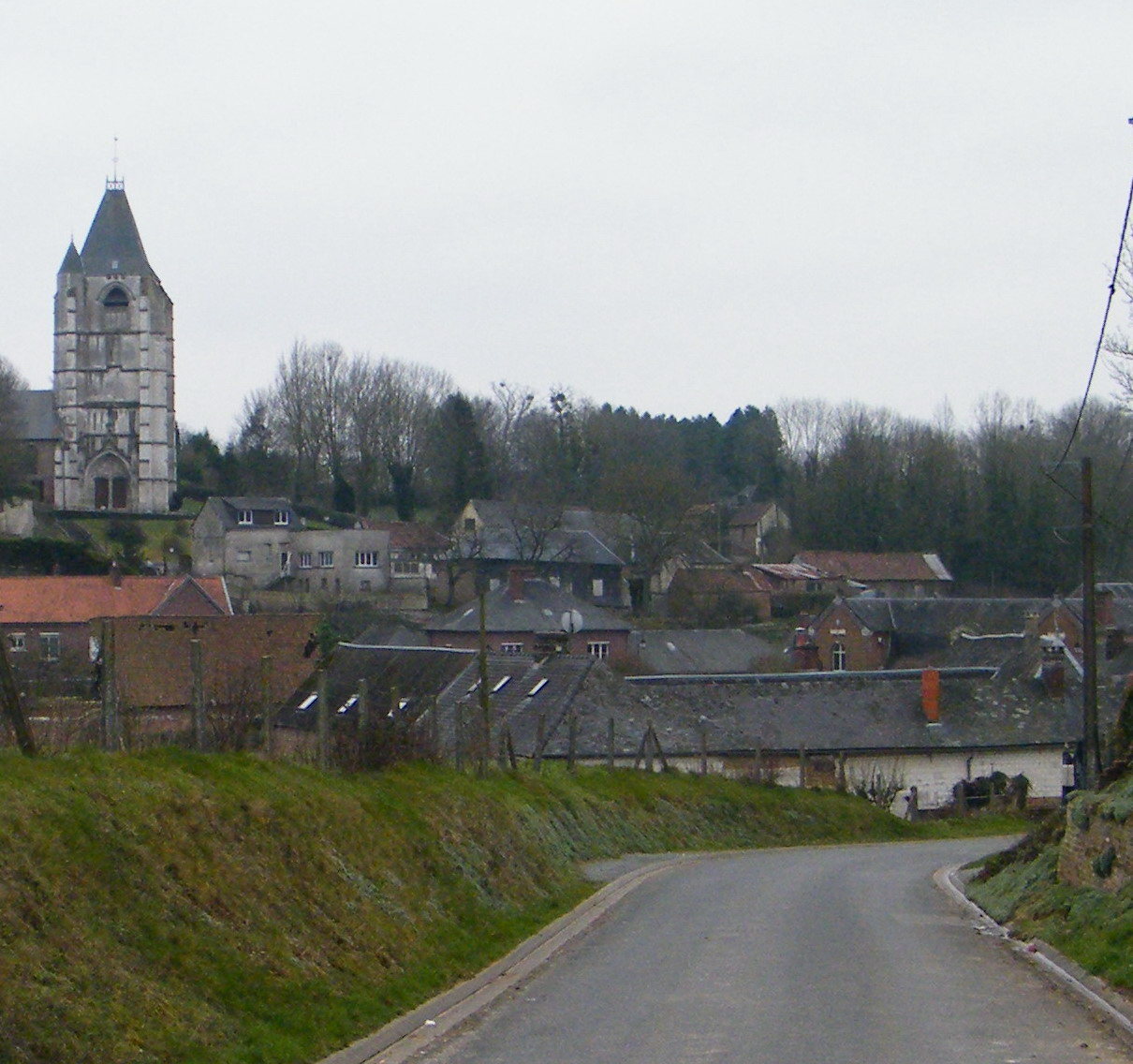
- The church and surroundings in Saint-Maulvis
- Location of Saint-Maulvis
- Location within France Location within Hauts-de-France
- Coordinates: 49°54′21″N 1°50′11″E
- Country: France
- Region: Hauts-de-France
- Department: Somme
- Arrondissement: Amiens
- Canton: Poix-de-Picardie
- Intercommunality: CC Somme Sud-Ouest

Government
  - Mayor (2020–2026): Marcel Malivoir
- Area^{1}: 6.21 km^{2} (2.40 sq mi)
- Elevation: 125 m (410 ft)
- Highest elevation: 157 m (515 ft)
- Lowest elevation: 98 m (322 ft)
- Population (2023): 279
  - Density: 44.9/km^{2} (116/sq mi)
- Time zone: UTC+01:00 (CET)
  - Summer (DST): UTC+02:00 (CEST)
- INSEE/Postal code: 80709 /80140
- ^{1} French Land Register data, which excludes lakes, ponds, glaciers > 1 km^{2} (0.386 sq mi or 247 acres) and river estuaries.

Saint-Maulvis (French pronunciation: [sɛ̃ molvi]; Picard: Saint-Meuvi) is a commune in the Somme department in Hauts-de-France in northern France.

== Geography ==
The commune is situated some 12 miles (19 km) south of Abbeville, on the D96 and D187 roads.

== Population ==
Historical population
Year	Pop.	±% p.a.
1968	293	—
1975	294	+0.05%
1982	242	−2.74%
1990	205	−2.05%
1999	226	+1.09%
2007	251	+1.32%
2012	256	+0.40%
2017	267	+0.84%
2023	279	+0.74%
Source: INSEE

== History ==
An important headquarters of the Order of Saint John existed here as early as 1179. The commander was also seigneur of this and a further 21 communes and there exercised ‘all justice’.
At the time of the Hundred Years War, in 1350, the village was totally burned down, except for the fortress sheltering the men-at-arms. The village was uninhabited for 16 years. From that time, the income of the commanderie was greatly reduced, so that the Grand Prior of France, Guillaume de Mailloc, summoned a general chapter at Paris in 1357.

== See also ==
- Communes of the Somme department
