= Le Quesne =

- Commune
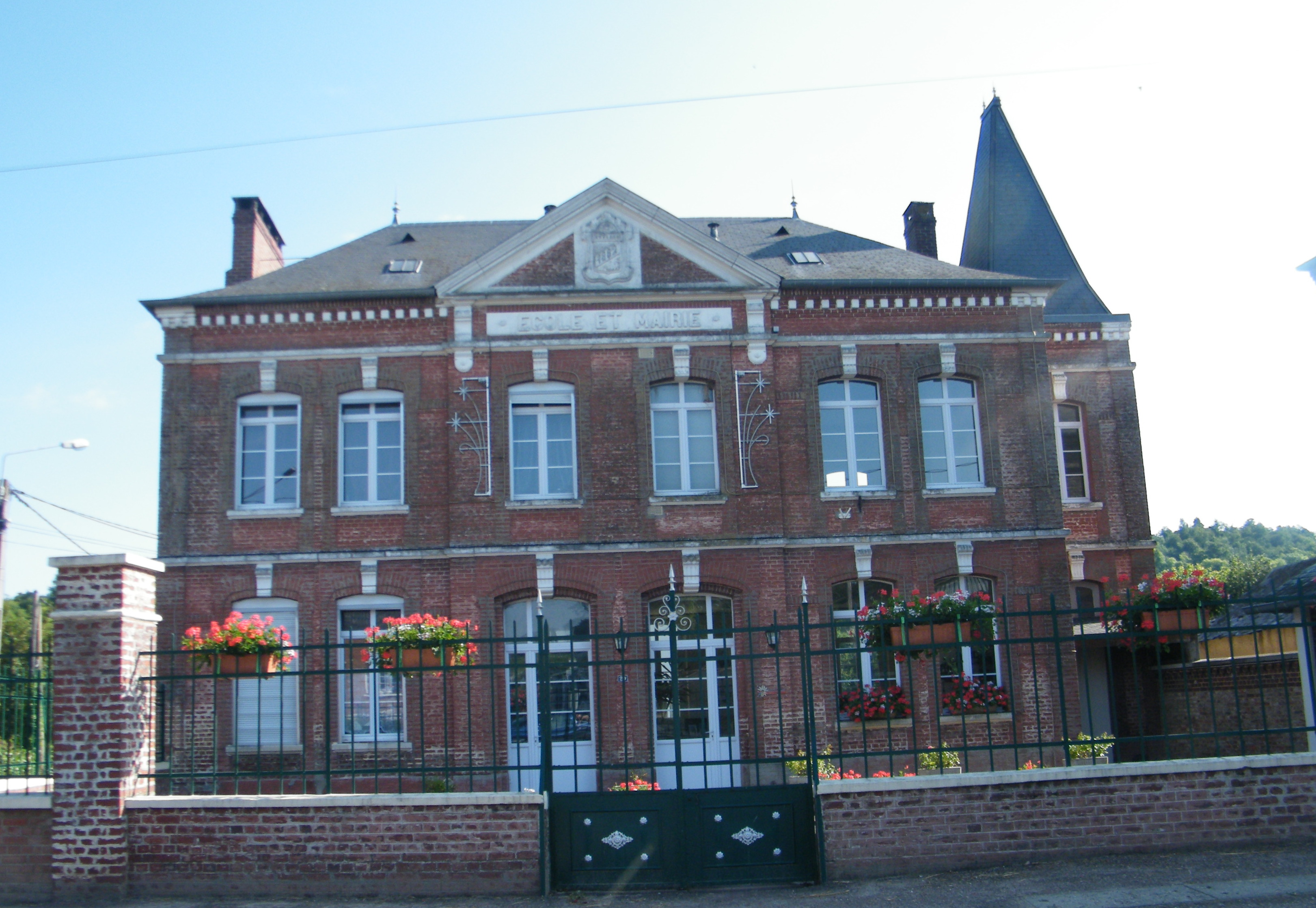
- The town hall and school in Le Quesne
- Location of Le Quesne
- Location within France Location within Hauts-de-France
- Coordinates: 49°51′48″N 1°47′57″E
- Country: France
- Region: Hauts-de-France
- Department: Somme
- Arrondissement: Amiens
- Canton: Poix-de-Picardie
- Intercommunality: CC Somme Sud-Ouest

Government
  - Mayor (2020–2026): Alexis Bourgois
- Area^{1}: 1.43 km^{2} (0.55 sq mi)
- Elevation: 140 m (460 ft)
- Highest elevation: 175 m (574 ft)
- Lowest elevation: 95 m (312 ft)
- Population (2023): 233
  - Density: 163/km^{2} (422/sq mi)
- Time zone: UTC+01:00 (CET)
  - Summer (DST): UTC+02:00 (CEST)
- INSEE/Postal code: 80651 /80430
- ^{1} French Land Register data, which excludes lakes, ponds, glaciers > 1 km^{2} (0.386 sq mi or 247 acres) and river estuaries.

Le Quesne (French pronunciation: [lə kɛn]) is a commune in the Somme department in Hauts-de-France in northern France.

== Geography ==
The commune is situated on the D211 road, some 21 miles (34 km) west of Amiens.

== Population ==
Historical population
| Year | Pop. | ±% p.a. |
|---|---|---|
| 1968 | 168 | — |
| 1975 | 303 | +8.79% |
| 1982 | 373 | +3.01% |
| 1990 | 313 | −2.17% |
| 1999 | 300 | −0.47% |
| 2007 | 278 | −0.95% |
| 2012 | 284 | +0.43% |
| 2017 | 267 | −1.23% |
| 2023 | 233 | −2.24% |
Source: INSEE

== See also ==
- Communes of the Somme department
