= Andainville =

Commune in Hauts-de-France, France

- Commune
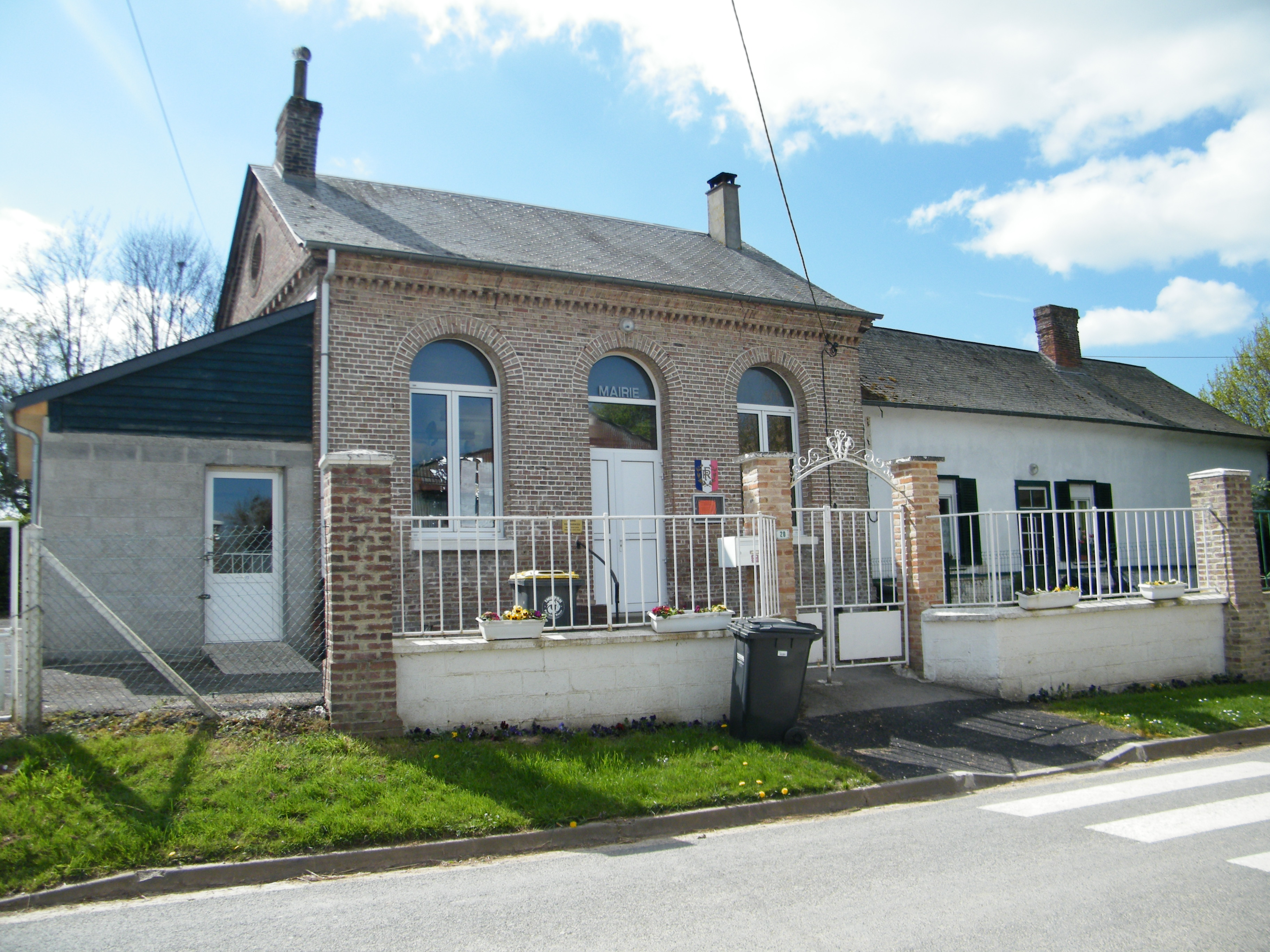
- The town hall of Andainville
- Location of Andainville
- Location within France Location within Hauts-de-France
- Coordinates: 49°53′36″N 1°47′09″E
- Country: France
- Region: Hauts-de-France
- Department: Somme
- Arrondissement: Amiens
- Canton: Poix-de-Picardie
- Intercommunality: CC Somme Sud-Ouest

Government
  - Mayor (2020–2026): Philippe Prat
- Area^{1}: 8.35 km^{2} (3.22 sq mi)
- Elevation: 163 m (535 ft)
- Highest elevation: 176 m (577 ft)
- Lowest elevation: 135 m (443 ft)
- Population (2023): 233
  - Density: 27.9/km^{2} (72.3/sq mi)
- Time zone: UTC+01:00 (CET)
  - Summer (DST): UTC+02:00 (CEST)
- INSEE/Postal code: 80022 /80140
- ^{1} French Land Register data, which excludes lakes, ponds, glaciers > 1 km^{2} (0.386 sq mi or 247 acres) and river estuaries.

Andainville (French pronunciation: [ɑ̃dɛ̃vil]; Picard: Adinville) is a commune in the Somme department in Hauts-de-France in northern France.

== Geography ==
The commune is situated 18 miles (29 km) south of Abbeville at the junction of the D187 and D110.

== Population ==
Historical population
Year	Pop.	±% p.a.
1968	287	—
1975	249	−2.01%
1982	201	−3.01%
1990	211	+0.61%
1999	196	−0.82%
2007	226	+1.80%
2012	228	+0.18%
2017	254	+2.18%
2023	233	−1.43%
Source: INSEE

== See also ==
Communes of the Somme department
