= Méricourt-en-Vimeu =

- Commune
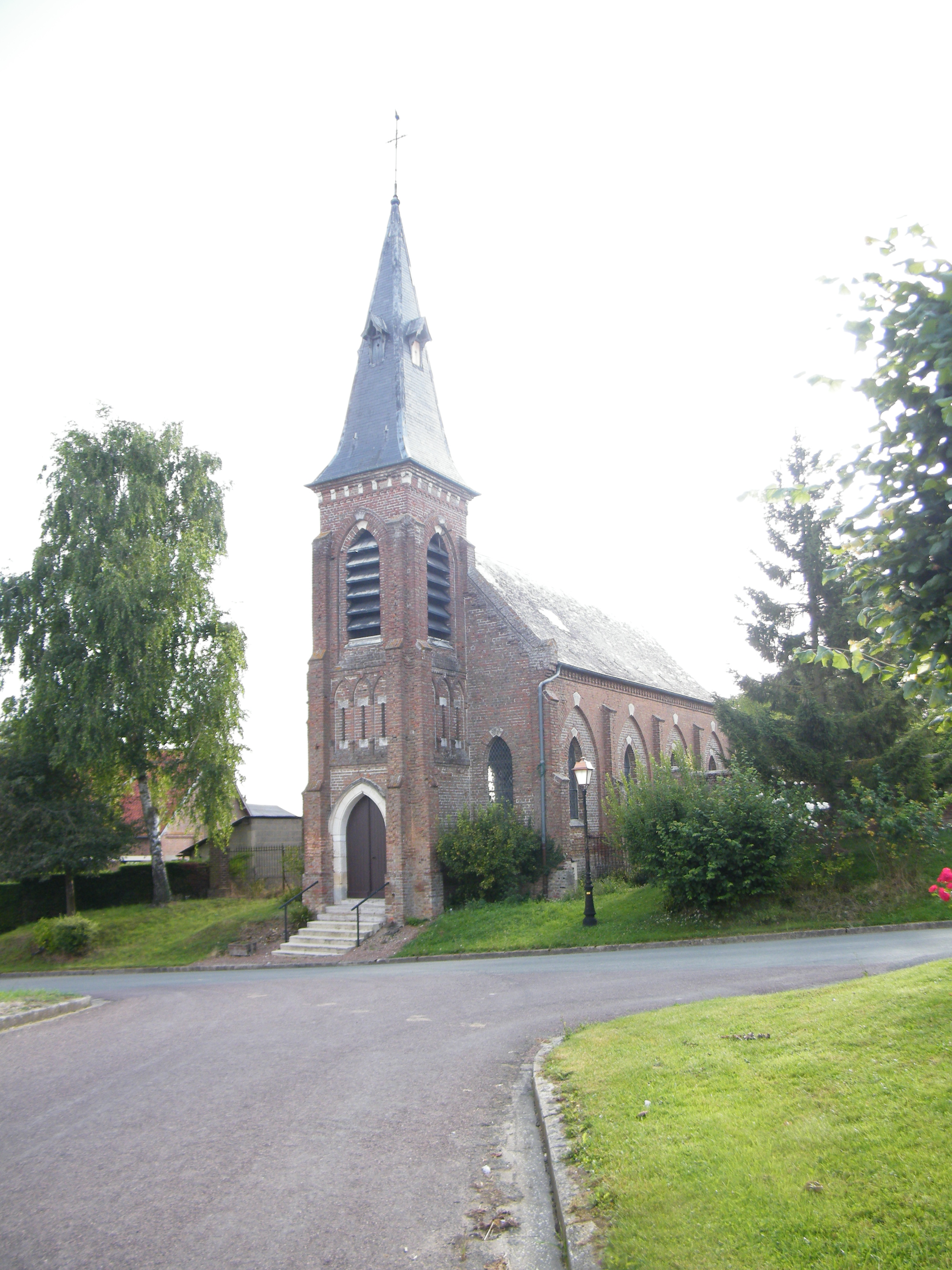
- The church in Méricourt-en-Vimeu
- Location of Méricourt-en-Vimeu
- Location within France Location within Hauts-de-France
- Coordinates: 49°53′49″N 1°56′57″E
- Country: France
- Region: Hauts-de-France
- Department: Somme
- Arrondissement: Amiens
- Canton: Poix-de-Picardie
- Intercommunality: CC Somme Sud-Ouest

Government
  - Mayor (2020–2026): Christophe Géraux
- Area^{1}: 3.31 km^{2} (1.28 sq mi)
- Elevation: 80 m (260 ft)
- Highest elevation: 125 m (410 ft)
- Lowest elevation: 53 m (174 ft)
- Population (2023): 106
  - Density: 32.0/km^{2} (82.9/sq mi)
- Time zone: UTC+01:00 (CET)
  - Summer (DST): UTC+02:00 (CEST)
- INSEE/Postal code: 80531 /80640
- ^{1} French Land Register data, which excludes lakes, ponds, glaciers > 1 km^{2} (0.386 sq mi or 247 acres) and river estuaries.

Méricourt-en-Vimeu (French pronunciation: [meʁikuʁ ɑ̃ vimø], literally Méricourt in Vimeu) is a commune in the Somme department in Hauts-de-France in northern France.

== Geography ==
The commune is situated on the D244 road, some 15 miles (24 km) west of Amiens.

== Population ==
Historical population
Year	Pop.	±% p.a.
1968	98	—
1975	88	−1.53%
1982	83	−0.83%
1990	101	+2.48%
1999	107	+0.64%
2007	113	+0.68%
2012	110	−0.54%
2017	103	−1.31%
2023	106	+0.48%
Source: INSEE

== See also ==
- Communes of the Somme department
