= Bermesnil =

- Commune
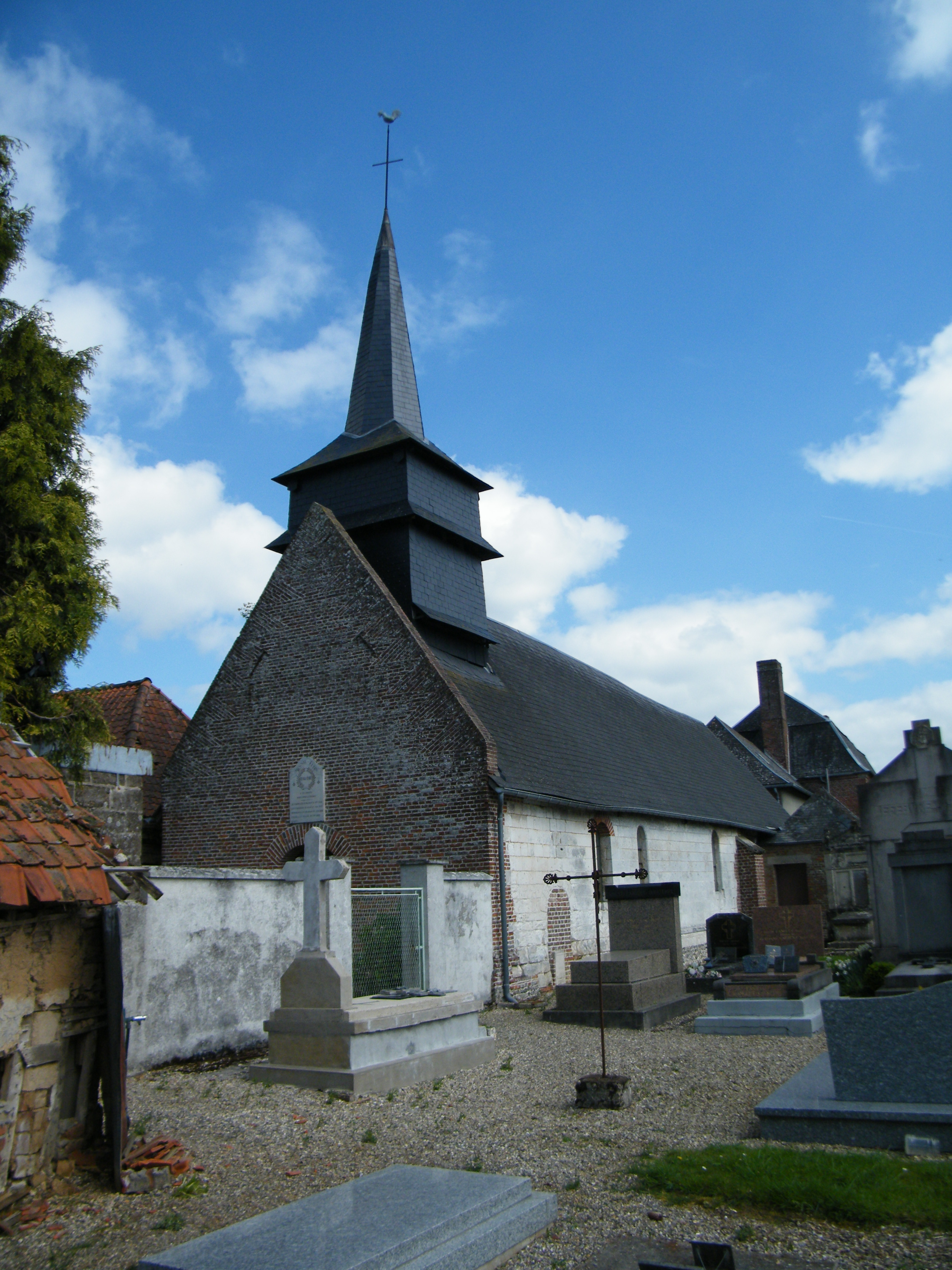
- The church of Mesnil-Eudin
- Location of Bermesnil
- Location within France Location within Hauts-de-France
- Coordinates: 49°53′57″N 1°44′09″E
- Country: France
- Region: Hauts-de-France
- Department: Somme
- Arrondissement: Amiens
- Canton: Poix-de-Picardie
- Intercommunality: CC Somme Sud-Ouest

Government
  - Mayor (2020–2026): Roger Taverne
- Area^{1}: 4.1 km^{2} (1.6 sq mi)
- Elevation: 179 m (587 ft)
- Highest elevation: 179 m (587 ft)
- Lowest elevation: 135 m (443 ft)
- Population (2023): 197
  - Density: 48/km^{2} (120/sq mi)
- Time zone: UTC+01:00 (CET)
  - Summer (DST): UTC+02:00 (CEST)
- INSEE/Postal code: 80084 /80140
- ^{1} French Land Register data, which excludes lakes, ponds, glaciers > 1 km^{2} (0.386 sq mi or 247 acres) and river estuaries.

Bermesnil (French pronunciation: [bɛʁmenil]; Picard: Bérmini) is a commune in the Somme department in Hauts-de-France in northern France.

== Geography ==
Bermesnil is situated on the D187 road, near the banks of the river Bresle, some 20 miles (32 km) southwest of Abbeville.

== Population ==
Historical population
| Year | Pop. | ±% p.a. |
|---|---|---|
| 1968 | 186 | — |
| 1975 | 182 | −0.31% |
| 1982 | 200 | +1.36% |
| 1990 | 214 | +0.85% |
| 1999 | 203 | −0.58% |
| 2007 | 249 | +2.59% |
| 2012 | 235 | −1.15% |
| 2017 | 222 | −1.13% |
| 2023 | 197 | −1.97% |
Source: INSEE

== See also ==
- Communes of the Somme department
