= Arguel, Somme =

Commune in Hauts-de-France, France

Arguel
- Commune
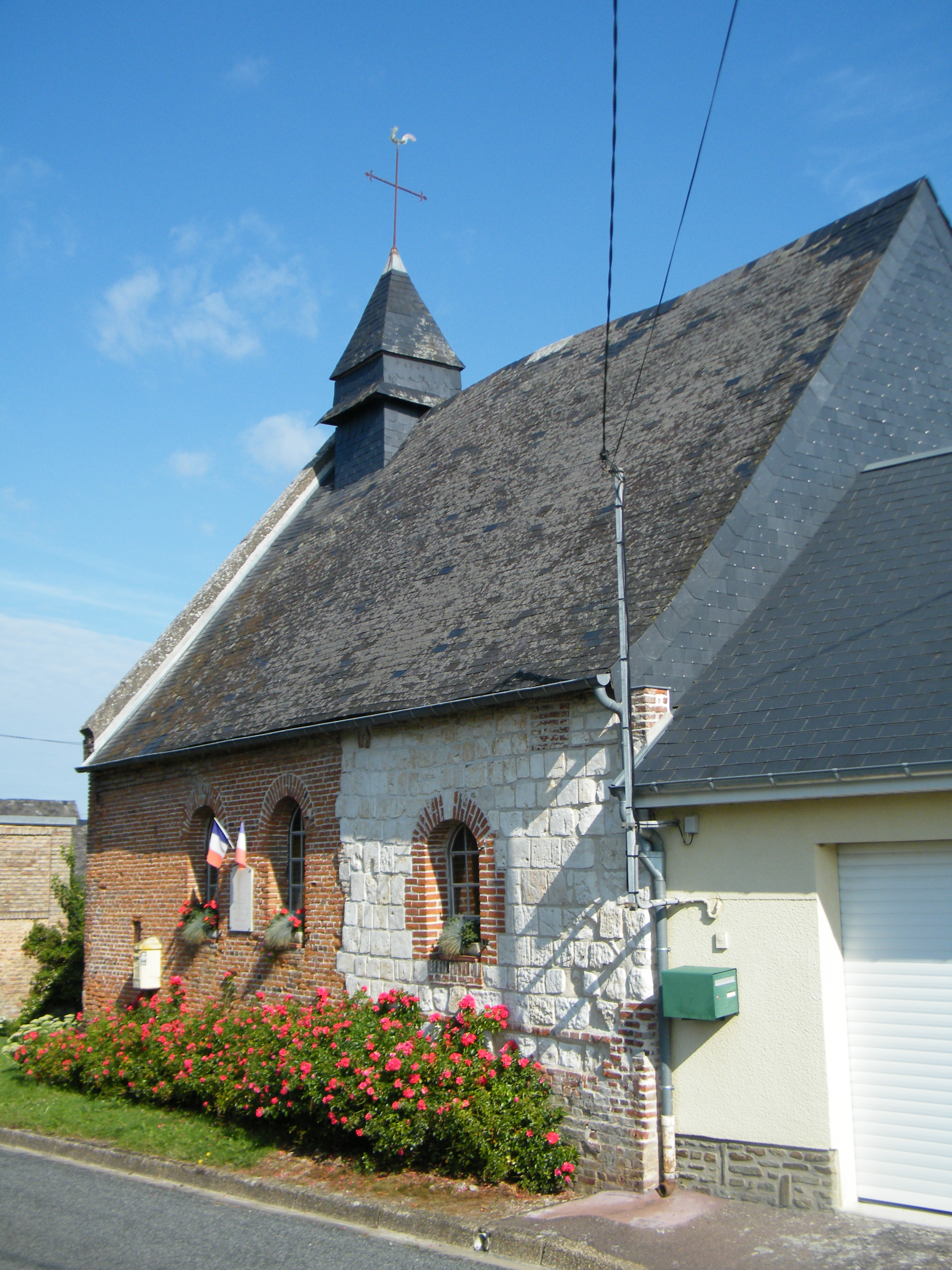
- The church in Arguel

- Coat of arms
- Location of Arguel
- Location within France Location within Hauts-de-France
- Coordinates: 49°52′02″N 1°48′09″E
- Country: France
- Region: Hauts-de-France
- Department: Somme
- Arrondissement: Amiens
- Canton: Poix-de-Picardie
- Intercommunality: CC Somme Sud-Ouest

Government
  - Mayor (2020–2026): Sylvie Vauchelle Mouton
- Area^{1}: 2.54 km^{2} (0.98 sq mi)
- Elevation: 200 m (660 ft)
- Highest elevation: 177 m (581 ft)
- Lowest elevation: 109 m (358 ft)
- Population (2023): 31
  - Density: 12/km^{2} (32/sq mi)
- Time zone: UTC+01:00 (CET)
  - Summer (DST): UTC+02:00 (CEST)
- INSEE/Postal code: 80026 /80140
- ^{1} French Land Register data, which excludes lakes, ponds, glaciers > 1 km^{2} (0.386 sq mi or 247 acres) and river estuaries.

Arguel (French pronunciation: [aʁɡwɛl]; also Argüel; Picard: Ardjué) is a commune in the Somme department in Hauts-de-France in northern France.

== Geography ==
The commune is situated 25 miles (40 km) west of Amiens on the D211.

== Population ==
Historical population
| Year | Pop. | ±% p.a. |
|---|---|---|
| 1968 | 54 | — |
| 1975 | 30 | −8.05% |
| 1982 | 35 | +2.23% |
| 1990 | 31 | −1.51% |
| 1999 | 35 | +1.36% |
| 2007 | 33 | −0.73% |
| 2012 | 29 | −2.55% |
| 2017 | 29 | +0.00% |
| 2023 | 31 | +1.12% |
Source: INSEE

== See also ==
Communes of the Somme department
