= Communauté de communes du Val de Nièvre et environs =

Coordinates: 50.0126°N 2.0819°E

Val de Nièvre et environs
- Former communauté de communes
- Interactive map of Val de Nièvre et environs
- Country: France
- Region: Hauts-de-France
- Department: Somme
- No. of communes: {{{nbcomm}}}
- Established: 1992
- Disbanded: 2017

The Communauté de communes du Val de Nièvre et environs is a former communauté de communes in the Somme département and in the Picardie région of France. It was created in December 1992. It was merged into the new Communauté de communes Nièvre et Somme in January 2017.

== Composition ==
This Communauté de communes comprised 20 communes:

1. Berteaucourt-les-Dames
2. Bettencourt-Saint-Ouen
3. Bouchon
4. Canaples
5. Domart-en-Ponthieu
6. L'Étoile
7. Flixecourt
8. Franqueville
9. Fransu
10. Halloy-lès-Pernois
11. Havernas
12. Lanches-Saint-Hilaire
13. Pernois
14. Ribeaucourt
15. Saint-Léger-lès-Domart
16. Saint-Ouen
17. Surcamps
18. Vauchelles-lès-Domart
19. Vignacourt
20. Ville-le-Marclet

== See also ==
- Communes of the Somme department
