= Canton of Domart-en-Ponthieu =

Coordinates: 50°4′31″N 2°7′34″E

Domart-en-Ponthieu
- Former canton
- Interactive map of Domart-en-Ponthieu
- Country: France
- Region: Hauts-de-France
- Department: Somme
- No. of communes: {{{nbcomm}}}
- Disbanded: 2015
- Area: 143.00 km^{2} (55.21 sq mi)
- Population (2012): 11,590
  - Density: 81.05/km^{2} (209.9/sq mi)

The Canton of Domart-en-Ponthieu is a former canton situated in the department of the Somme and in the Picardie region of northern France. It was disbanded following the French canton reorganisation which came into effect in March 2015. It had 11,590 inhabitants (2012).

== Geography ==
The canton is organised around the commune of Domart-en-Ponthieu in the arrondissement of Amiens. The altitude varies from 19m at Saint-Ouen to 166m at Bonneville for an average of 73m.

The canton comprised 20 communes:

- Berneuil
- Berteaucourt-les-Dames
- Bonneville
- Canaples
- Domart-en-Ponthieu
- Franqueville
- Fransu
- Halloy-lès-Pernois
- Havernas
- Lanches-Saint-Hilaire
- Fieffes-Montrelet
- Naours
- Pernois
- Ribeaucourt
- Saint-Léger-lès-Domart
- Saint-Ouen
- Surcamps
- Vauchelles-lès-Domart
- La Vicogne
- Wargnies

== Population ==
1962	1968	1975	1982	1990	1999
9499	10220	10137	10535	10936	11096
Census count starting from 1962 : Population without double counting

== See also ==
- Arrondissements of the Somme department
- Cantons of the Somme department
- Communes of the Somme department
