= Canton of Picquigny =

Coordinates: 49°56′42″N 2°8′41″E

Picquigny
- Former canton
- Interactive map of Picquigny
- Country: France
- Region: Hauts-de-France
- Department: Somme
- No. of communes: {{{nbcomm}}}
- Disbanded: 2015
- Area: 208.05 km^{2} (80.33 sq mi)
- Population (2012): 18,451
  - Density: 88.685/km^{2} (229.69/sq mi)

The Canton of Picquigny is a former canton situated in the department of the Somme and in the Picardy region of northern France. It was disbanded following the French canton reorganisation which came into effect in March 2015. It had 18,451 inhabitants (2012).

== Geography ==
The canton is organised around the commune of Picquigny in the arrondissement of Amiens. The altitude varies from 6 m at Flixecourt to 134 m at Vignacourt for an average of 50 m.

The canton comprised 21 communes:

- Ailly-sur-Somme
- Belloy-sur-Somme
- Bettencourt-Saint-Ouen
- Bouchon
- Bourdon
- Breilly
- Cavillon
- La Chaussée-Tirancourt
- Condé-Folie
- Crouy-Saint-Pierre
- L'Étoile
- Ferrières
- Flixecourt
- Fourdrinoy
- Hangest-sur-Somme
- Le Mesge
- Picquigny
- Soues
- Vignacourt
- Ville-le-Marclet
- Yzeux

== Places of interest ==
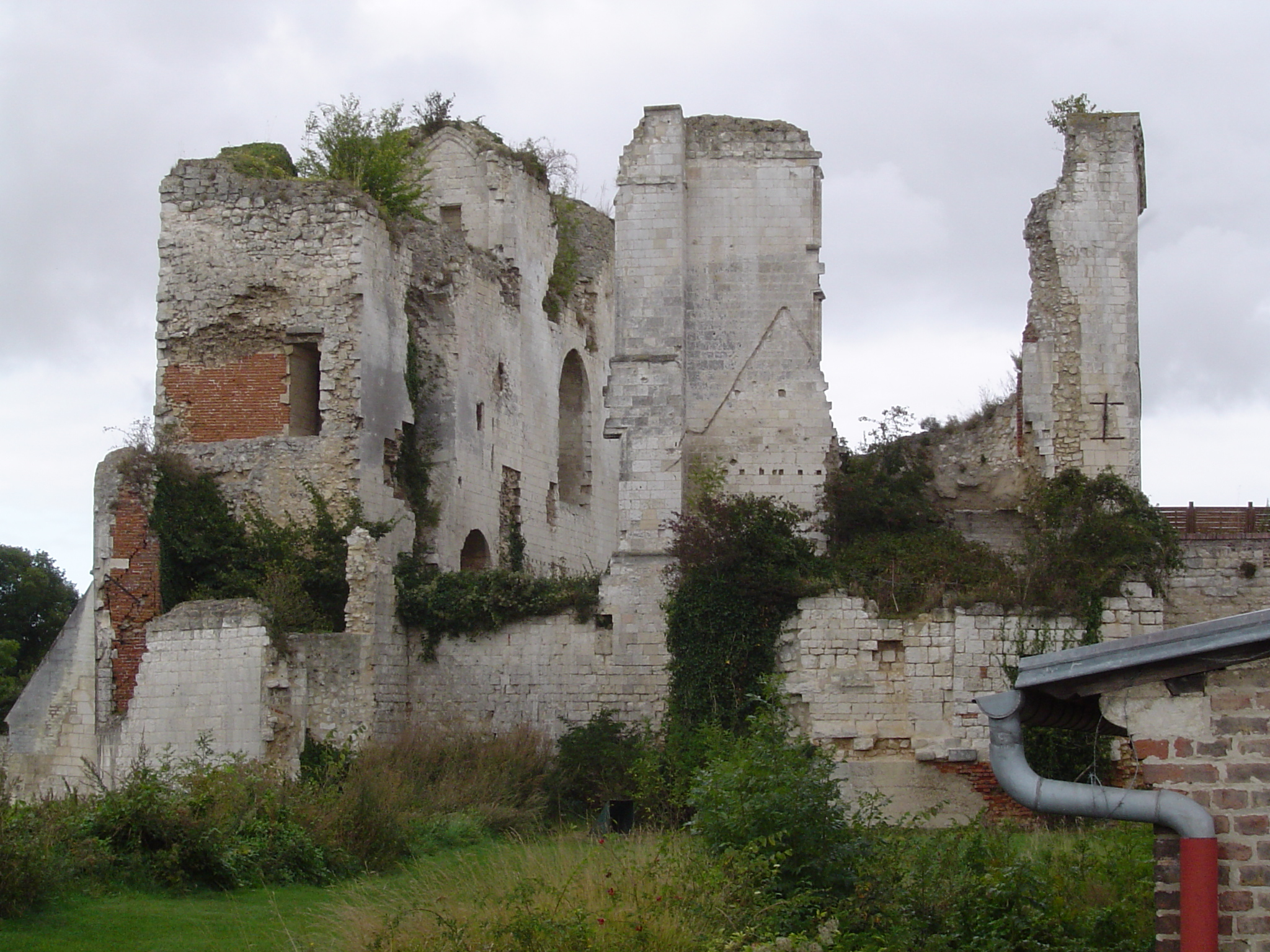
The château at Picquigny

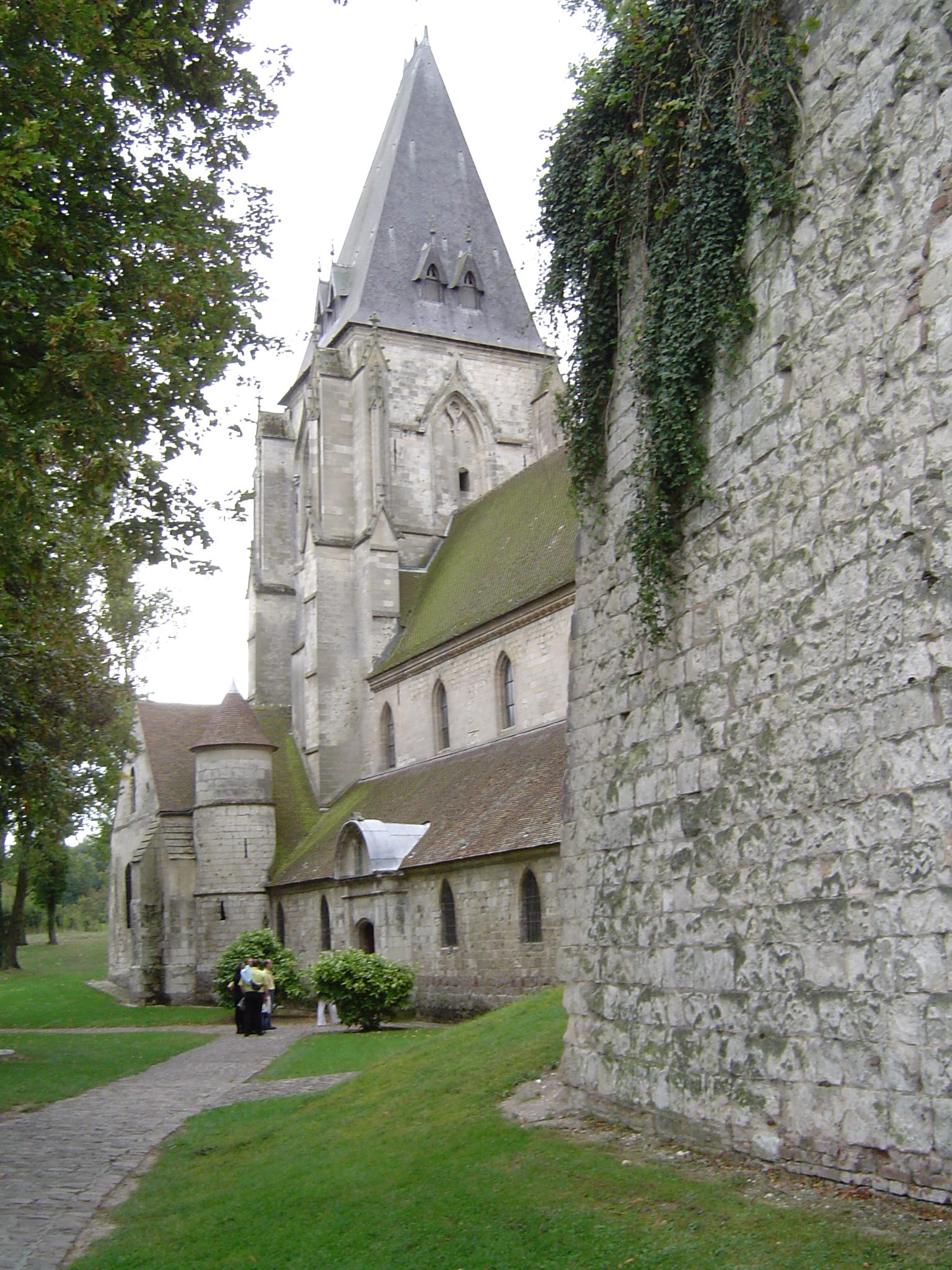
The church

== Population ==
1962	1968	1975	1982	1990	1999
15038	16084	18248	18336	17735	17702
Census count starting from 1962 : Population without double counting

== See also ==
- Arrondissements of the Somme department
- Cantons of the Somme department
- Communes of the Somme department
