= Communauté de communes de l'Ouest d'Amiens =

Coordinates: 49.946°N 2.1418°E

l'Ouest d'Amiens
- Former communauté de communes
- Interactive map of l'Ouest d'Amiens
- Country: France
- Region: Hauts-de-France
- Department: Somme
- No. of communes: {{{nbcomm}}}
- Disbanded: 2017

The Communauté de communes de l'Ouest d'Amiens is a former communauté de communes in the Somme département and in the Picardy région of France. It was merged into the new Communauté de communes Nièvre et Somme in January 2017.

== Composition ==
This Communauté de communes included 18 communes:

1. Ailly-sur-Somme
2. Argœuves
3. Belloy-sur-Somme
4. Bourdon
5. Breilly
6. Cavillon
7. Crouy-Saint-Pierre
8. Ferrières
9. Fourdrinoy
10. Hangest-sur-Somme
11. La Chaussée-Tirancourt
12. Le Mesge
13. Picquigny
14. Saint-Sauveur
15. Saisseval
16. Seux
17. Soues
18. Yzeux

== See also ==
- Communes of the Somme department
