= Canton of Flixecourt =

Coordinates: 50.01°N 2.08°E

The canton of Flixecourt is an administrative division of the Somme department, in northern France. It was created at the French canton reorganisation which came into effect in March 2015. Its seat is in Flixecourt.

It consists of the following communes:

1. Berteaucourt-les-Dames
2. Bettencourt-Saint-Ouen
3. Bouchon
4. Canaples
5. Condé-Folie
6. Domart-en-Ponthieu
7. L'Étoile
8. Flesselles
9. Flixecourt
10. Franqueville
11. Fransu
12. Halloy-lès-Pernois
13. Havernas
14. Lanches-Saint-Hilaire
15. Pernois
16. Ribeaucourt
17. Saint-Léger-lès-Domart
18. Saint-Ouen
19. Saint-Vaast-en-Chaussée
20. Surcamps
21. Vauchelles-lès-Domart
22. Vaux-en-Amiénois
23. Vignacourt
24. Ville-le-Marclet
