= Communauté de communes Nièvre et Somme =

Federation of municipalities in France

Nièvre et Somme
- Communauté de communes
- Interactive map of Nièvre et Somme
- Coordinates: 50°01′N 02°05′E
- Country: France
- Region: Hauts-de-France
- Department: Somme
- No. of communes: {{{nbcomm}}}
- Established: 2017
- Area: 314.2 km^{2} (121.3 sq mi)
- Population (2019): 27,972
  - Density: 89.03/km^{2} (230.6/sq mi)

The Communauté de communes Nièvre et Somme is a communauté de communes in the Somme département and in the Hauts-de-France région of France. It was formed on 1 January 2017 by the merger of the former Communauté de communes de l'Ouest d'Amiens and the Communauté de communes du Val de Nièvre et environs. On 1 January 2018 it lost 2 communes to the Communauté d'agglomération Amiens Métropole. It consists of 36 communes, and its seat is in Flixecourt. Its area is 314.2 km^{2}, and its population was 27,972 in 2019.

== Composition ==
The communauté de communes consists of the following 36 communes:

1. Ailly-sur-Somme
2. Argœuves
3. Belloy-sur-Somme
4. Berteaucourt-les-Dames
5. Bettencourt-Saint-Ouen
6. Bouchon
7. Bourdon
8. Breilly
9. Canaples
10. Cavillon
11. Crouy-Saint-Pierre
12. Domart-en-Ponthieu
13. L'Étoile
14. Flixecourt
15. Fourdrinoy
16. Franqueville
17. Fransu
18. Halloy-lès-Pernois
19. Hangest-sur-Somme
20. Havernas
21. La Chaussée-Tirancourt
22. Lanches-Saint-Hilaire
23. Le Mesge
24. Pernois
25. Picquigny
26. Ribeaucourt
27. Saint-Léger-lès-Domart
28. Saint-Ouen
29. Saint-Sauveur
30. Saisseval
31. Soues
32. Surcamps
33. Vauchelles-lès-Domart
34. Vignacourt
35. Ville-le-Marclet
36. Yzeux
