= Condé-Folie =

- Commune
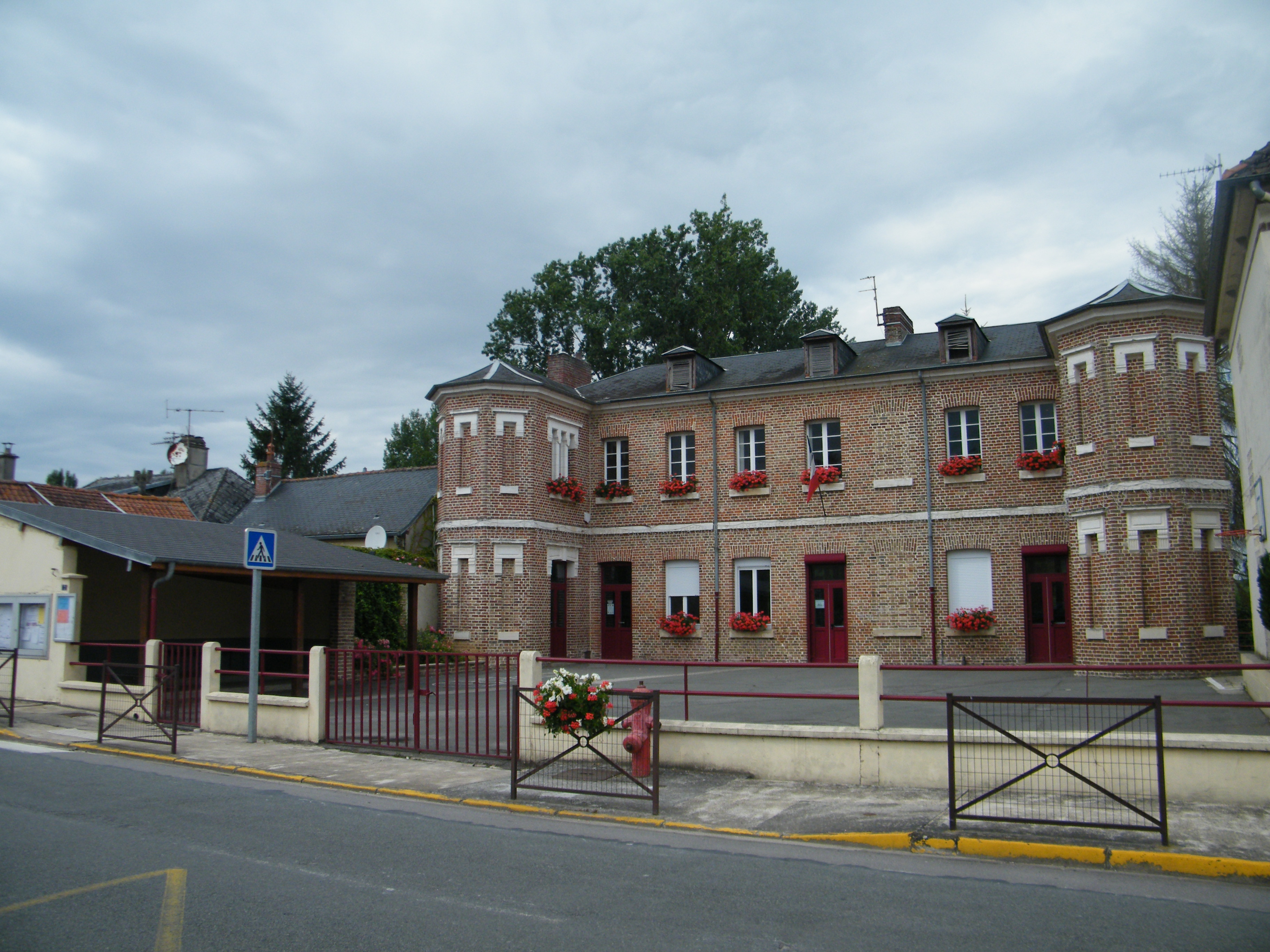
- The town hall in Condé-Folie
- Location of Condé-Folie
- Location within France Location within Hauts-de-France
- Coordinates: 50°00′38″N 2°01′07″E
- Country: France
- Region: Hauts-de-France
- Department: Somme
- Arrondissement: Abbeville
- Canton: Flixecourt
- Intercommunality: CA Baie de Somme

Government
  - Mayor (2020–2026): Didier Danten
- Area^{1}: 10.37 km^{2} (4.00 sq mi)
- Elevation: 14 m (46 ft)
- Highest elevation: 96 m (315 ft)
- Lowest elevation: 7 m (23 ft)
- Population (2023): 865
  - Density: 83.4/km^{2} (216/sq mi)
- Time zone: UTC+01:00 (CET)
  - Summer (DST): UTC+02:00 (CEST)
- INSEE/Postal code: 80205 /80890
- ^{1} French Land Register data, which excludes lakes, ponds, glaciers > 1 km^{2} (0.386 sq mi or 247 acres) and river estuaries.

Condé-Folie (French pronunciation: [kɔ̃de fɔli]; Picard: Conda-Folie) is a commune in the Somme department in Hauts-de-France in northern France.

== Geography ==
The commune is situated on the D3 road, on the banks of the river Somme, some 12 miles (19 km) southeast of Abbeville.

== Population ==
Historical population
Year	Pop.	±% p.a.
1968	904	—
1975	798	−1.77%
1982	778	−0.36%
1990	798	+0.32%
1999	816	+0.25%
2007	843	+0.41%
2012	922	+1.81%
2017	916	−0.13%
2023	865	−0.95%
Source: INSEE

== See also ==
- Communes of the Somme department
