= Vauchelles-lès-Domart =

- Commune
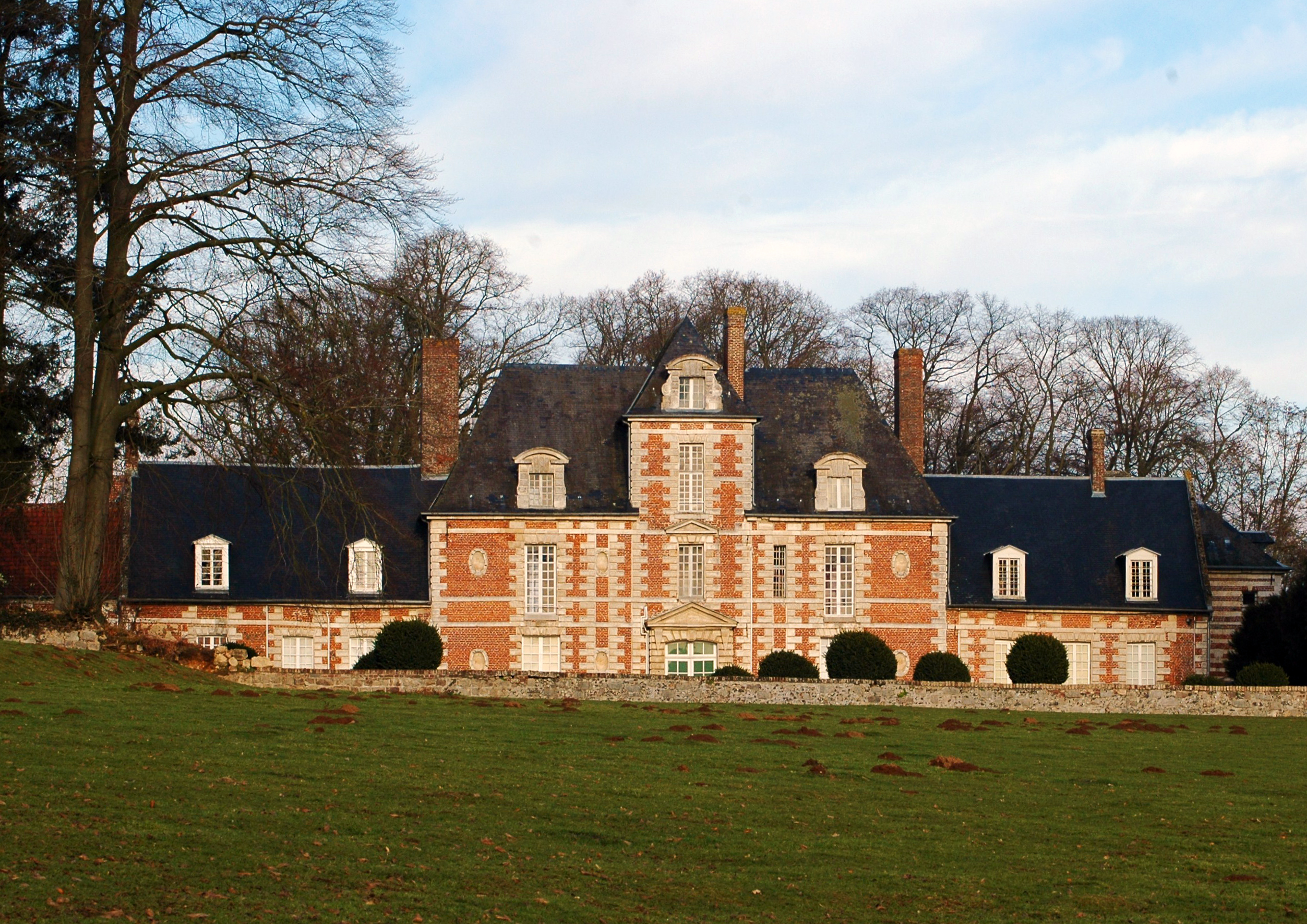
- The chateau in Vauchelles-lès-Domart
- Location of Vauchelles-lès-Domart
- Location within France Location within Hauts-de-France
- Coordinates: 50°03′21″N 2°03′23″E
- Country: France
- Region: Hauts-de-France
- Department: Somme
- Arrondissement: Amiens
- Canton: Flixecourt
- Intercommunality: CC Nièvre et Somme

Government
  - Mayor (2020–2026): Joël Boulard
- Area^{1}: 3.92 km^{2} (1.51 sq mi)
- Elevation: 70 m (230 ft)
- Highest elevation: 114 m (374 ft)
- Lowest elevation: 42 m (138 ft)
- Population (2023): 120
  - Density: 31/km^{2} (79/sq mi)
- Time zone: UTC+01:00 (CET)
  - Summer (DST): UTC+02:00 (CEST)
- INSEE/Postal code: 80778 /80620
- ^{1} French Land Register data, which excludes lakes, ponds, glaciers > 1 km^{2} (0.386 sq mi or 247 acres) and river estuaries.

Vauchelles-lès-Domart (French pronunciation: [voʃɛl lɛ dɔmaʁ], literally Vauchelles near Domart; Picard: Veuchelle-lès-Donmart) is a commune in the Somme department in Hauts-de-France in northern France.

== Geography ==
The commune is situated 26 kilometres (16 mi) northwest of Amiens, on the D158 road, just off the N1.

== Population ==
Historical population
Year	Pop.	±% p.a.
1968	112	—
1975	109	−0.39%
1982	121	+1.50%
1990	138	+1.66%
1999	106	−2.89%
2007	127	+2.29%
2012	120	−1.13%
2017	125	+0.82%
2023	120	−0.68%
Source: INSEE

== Places of interest ==
- The seventeenth century Château of Vauchelles Les Domarts.

== See also ==
- Communes of the Somme department
