= Fransu =

- Commune
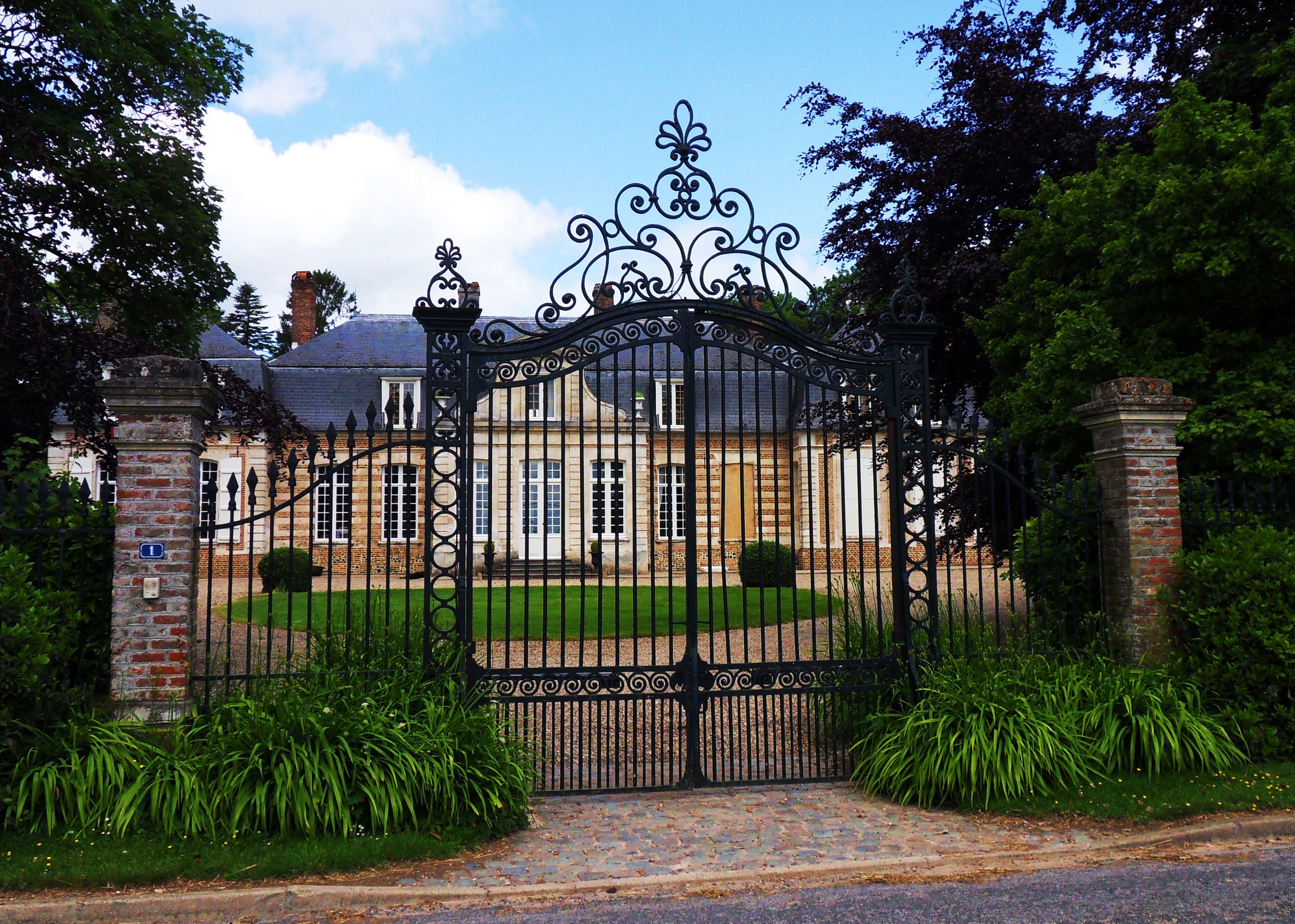
- The chateau in Fransu
- Location of Fransu
- Location within France Location within Hauts-de-France
- Coordinates: 50°06′37″N 2°05′39″E
- Country: France
- Region: Hauts-de-France
- Department: Somme
- Arrondissement: Amiens
- Canton: Flixecourt
- Intercommunality: CC Nièvre et Somme

Government
  - Mayor (2020–2026): Philippe Mauger
- Area^{1}: 5.64 km^{2} (2.18 sq mi)
- Elevation: 113 m (371 ft)
- Highest elevation: 122 m (400 ft)
- Lowest elevation: 67 m (220 ft)
- Population (2023): 193
  - Density: 34.2/km^{2} (88.6/sq mi)
- Time zone: UTC+01:00 (CET)
  - Summer (DST): UTC+02:00 (CEST)
- INSEE/Postal code: 80348 /80620
- ^{1} French Land Register data, which excludes lakes, ponds, glaciers > 1 km^{2} (0.386 sq mi or 247 acres) and river estuaries.

Fransu (French pronunciation: [fʁɑ̃sy]) is a commune in the Somme department in Hauts-de-France in northern France.

== Geography ==
Fransu is situated 16 miles (26 km) east of Abbeville on the D130 and D66 road junction

== Population ==
Historical population
Year	Pop.	±% p.a.
1968	148	—
1975	139	−0.89%
1982	117	−2.43%
1990	126	+0.93%
1999	104	−2.11%
2007	119	+1.70%
2012	153	+5.15%
2017	176	+2.84%
2023	193	+1.55%
Source: INSEE

== See also ==
- Communes of the Somme department
