= Ville-le-Marclet =

- Commune
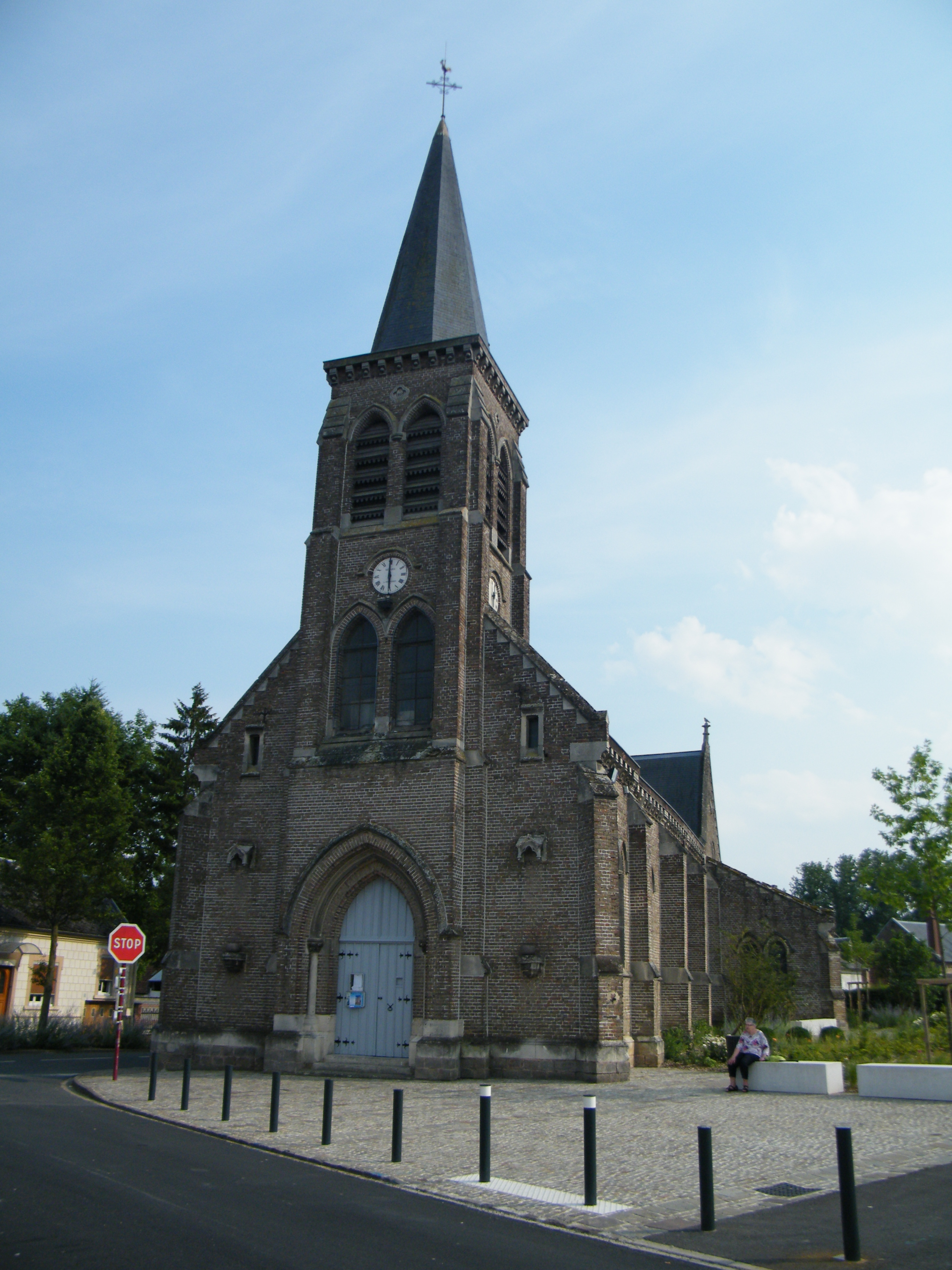
- The church in Ville-le-Marclet
- Location of Ville-le-Marclet
- Location within France Location within Hauts-de-France
- Coordinates: 50°01′24″N 2°05′22″E
- Country: France
- Region: Hauts-de-France
- Department: Somme
- Arrondissement: Amiens
- Canton: Flixecourt
- Intercommunality: CC Nièvre et Somme

Government
  - Mayor (2020–2026): Didier Leblanc
- Area^{1}: 8.93 km^{2} (3.45 sq mi)
- Elevation: 26 m (85 ft)
- Highest elevation: 113 m (371 ft)
- Lowest elevation: 17 m (56 ft)
- Population (2023): 461
  - Density: 51.6/km^{2} (134/sq mi)
- Time zone: UTC+01:00 (CET)
  - Summer (DST): UTC+02:00 (CEST)
- INSEE/Postal code: 80795 /80420
- ^{1} French Land Register data, which excludes lakes, ponds, glaciers > 1 km^{2} (0.386 sq mi or 247 acres) and river estuaries.

Ville-le-Marclet is a commune in the Somme department in Hauts-de-France in northern France.

== Geography ==
The commune is situated 24 km (15 miles) northwest of Amiens, on the D159 road and 1 mile(1.6 km) from a junction with the A16 autoroute.

== Population ==
Historical population
Year	Pop.	±% p.a.
1968	485	—
1975	556	+1.97%
1982	512	−1.17%
1990	508	−0.10%
1999	511	+0.07%
2007	479	−0.81%
2012	500	+0.86%
2017	473	−1.10%
2023	461	−0.43%
Source: INSEE

== See also ==
- Communes of the Somme department
