= Ribeaucourt, Somme =

Ribeaucourt
- Commune
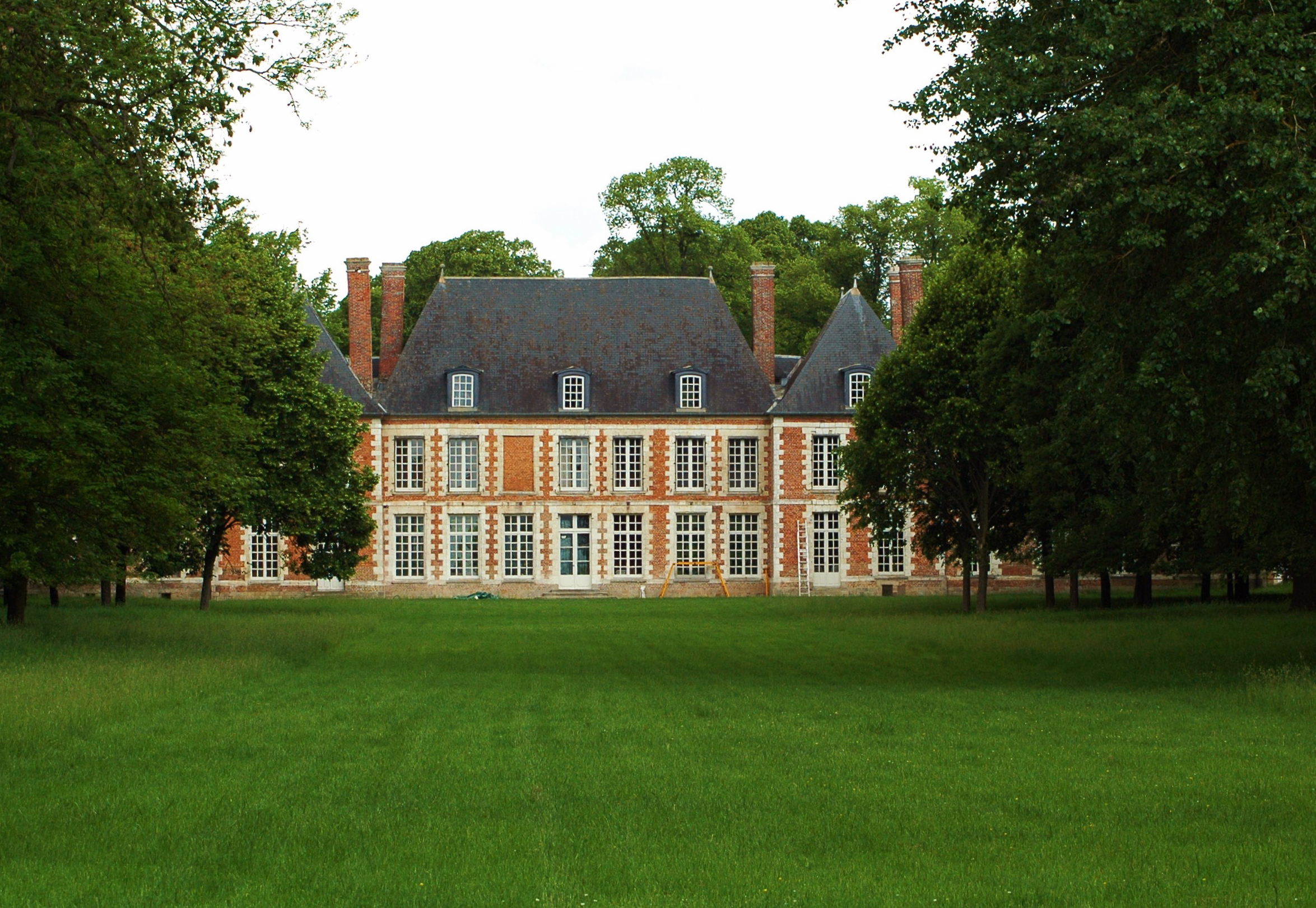
- The chateau in Ribeaucourt

- Coat of arms
- Location of Ribeaucourt
- Location within France Location within Hauts-de-France
- Coordinates: 50°07′04″N 2°07′11″E
- Country: France
- Region: Hauts-de-France
- Department: Somme
- Arrondissement: Amiens
- Canton: Flixecourt
- Intercommunality: CC Nièvre et Somme

Government
  - Mayor (2020–2026): Philippe Bellaredj
- Area^{1}: 5.42 km^{2} (2.09 sq mi)
- Elevation: 135 m (443 ft)
- Highest elevation: 136 m (446 ft)
- Lowest elevation: 83 m (272 ft)
- Population (2023): 223
  - Density: 41.1/km^{2} (107/sq mi)
- Time zone: UTC+01:00 (CET)
  - Summer (DST): UTC+02:00 (CEST)
- INSEE/Postal code: 80671 /80620
- ^{1} French Land Register data, which excludes lakes, ponds, glaciers > 1 km^{2} (0.386 sq mi or 247 acres) and river estuaries.

Ribeaucourt (French pronunciation: [ʁibokuʁ]) is a commune in the Somme department in Hauts-de-France in northern France.

== Geography ==
Ribeaucourt is situated 15 miles (24 km) east of Abbeville, on the D185 and D66 crossroads.

== Population ==
Historical population
Year	Pop.	±% p.a.
1968	206	—
1975	208	+0.14%
1982	178	−2.20%
1990	209	+2.03%
1999	185	−1.35%
2007	185	+0.00%
2012	243	+5.61%
2017	250	+0.57%
2023	223	−1.89%
Source: INSEE

== History ==
The name of the commune is a corruption of Erembauldocurtis (which comes from "Eremboldus" = (skilful or bold leader) and "curtis", meaning a fortified house). Eremboldus was the name of several male members of the Ribeaucourt family, vassals to the abbey of Saint Riquier. The other communes in France bearing the same name have the same origins.
During the Second World War, Ribeaucourt forest was the site of launching ramps for the German V1 missiles. The Germans also occupied the château. Allied bombardments on the 5 and 7 July 1944 caused serious damage to the village and the forest.

== Places of interest ==
- The 17th/18th-century château and park. Classed as a historic monument.
- The church of Saint-Sulpice. Classed as a historic monument in 1993.
- The war memorial.

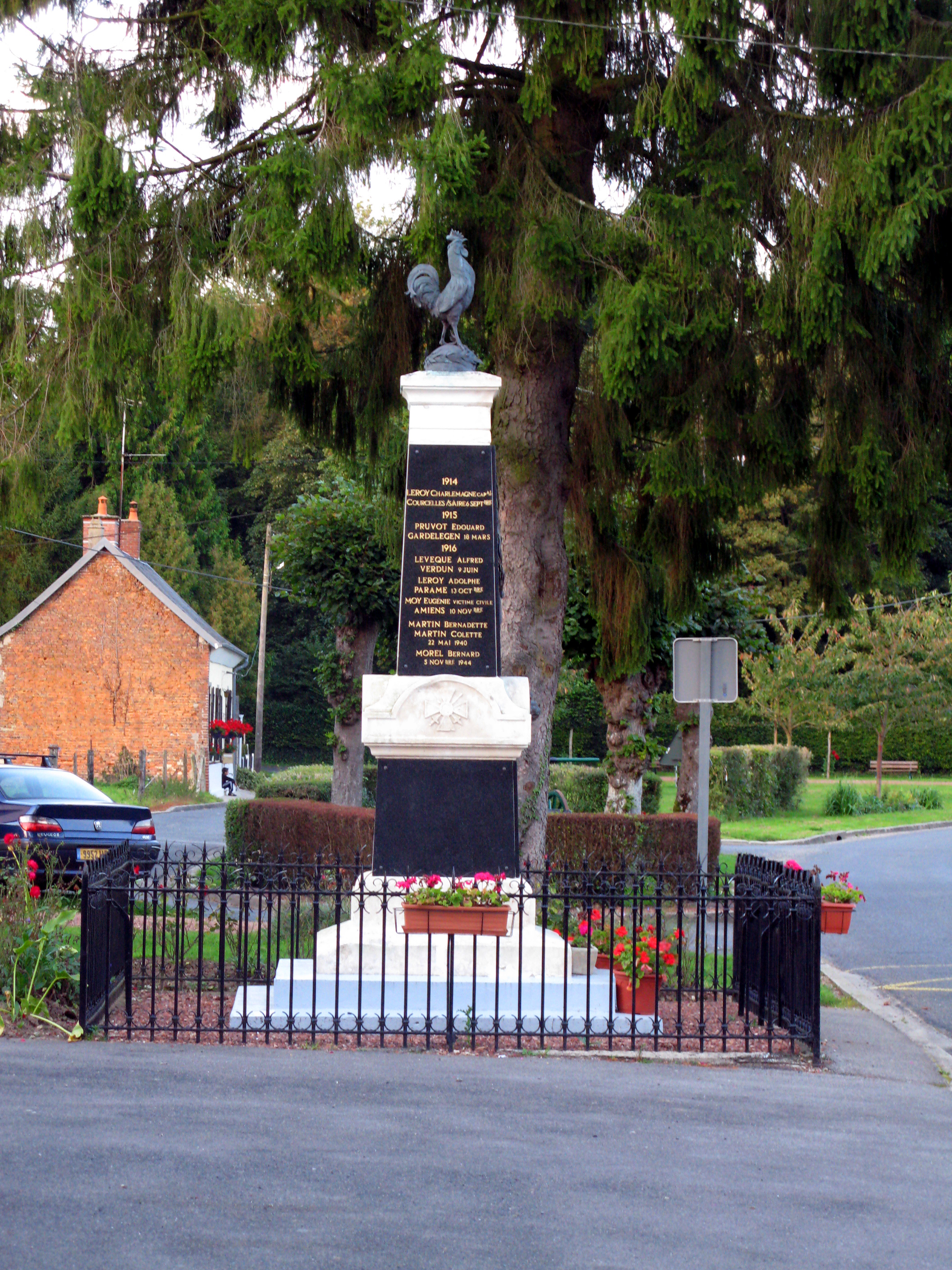
The war memorial

== See also ==
- Communes of the Somme department
