= Bettencourt-Saint-Ouen =

- Commune
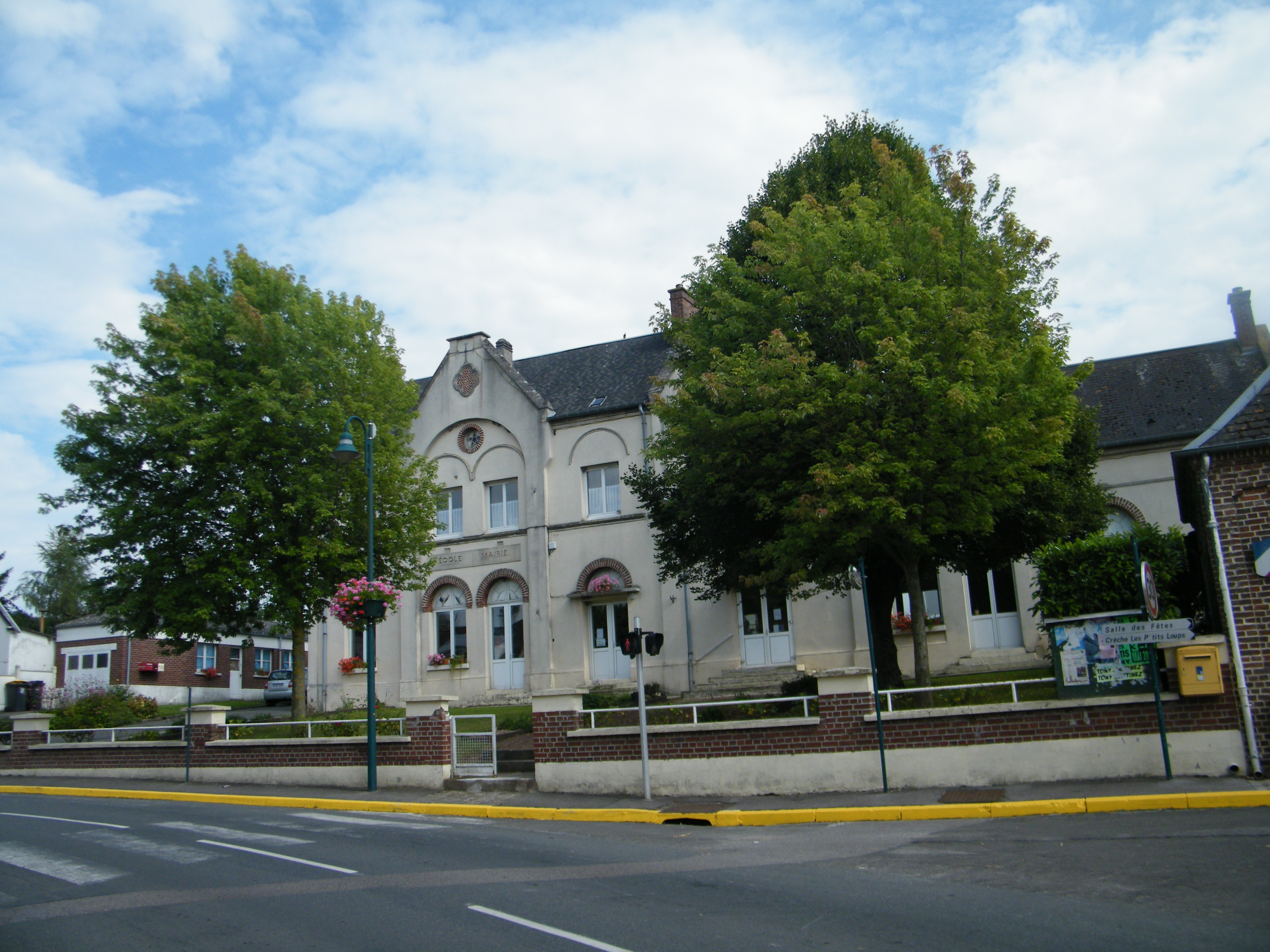
- The town hall and school in Bettencourt-Saint-Ouen
- Location of Bettencourt-Saint-Ouen
- Location within France Location within Hauts-de-France
- Coordinates: 50°01′35″N 2°06′44″E
- Country: France
- Region: Hauts-de-France
- Department: Somme
- Arrondissement: Amiens
- Canton: Flixecourt
- Intercommunality: CC Nièvre et Somme

Government
  - Mayor (2020–2026): Claude Fourcroy
- Area^{1}: 8.04 km^{2} (3.10 sq mi)
- Elevation: 35 m (115 ft)
- Highest elevation: 103 m (338 ft)
- Lowest elevation: 17 m (56 ft)
- Population (2023): 605
  - Density: 75.2/km^{2} (195/sq mi)
- Time zone: UTC+01:00 (CET)
  - Summer (DST): UTC+02:00 (CEST)
- INSEE/Postal code: 80100 /80610
- ^{1} French Land Register data, which excludes lakes, ponds, glaciers > 1 km^{2} (0.386 sq mi or 247 acres) and river estuaries.

Bettencourt-Saint-Ouen (Picard: Bétincourt-Saint-Ouin) is a commune in the Somme department and Hauts-de-France region of northern France.

== Geography ==
The commune is situated on the D57 road, some 18 miles (29 km) northwest of Amiens and less than a mile from the A16 autoroute.

== Population ==
Historical population
Year	Pop.	±% p.a.
1968	377	—
1975	340	−1.46%
1982	345	+0.21%
1990	389	+1.51%
1999	410	+0.59%
2007	516	+2.92%
2012	660	+5.05%
2017	619	−1.27%
2023	605	−0.38%
Source: INSEE

== See also ==
- Communes of the Somme department
