= Franqueville, Somme =

Franqueville
- Commune
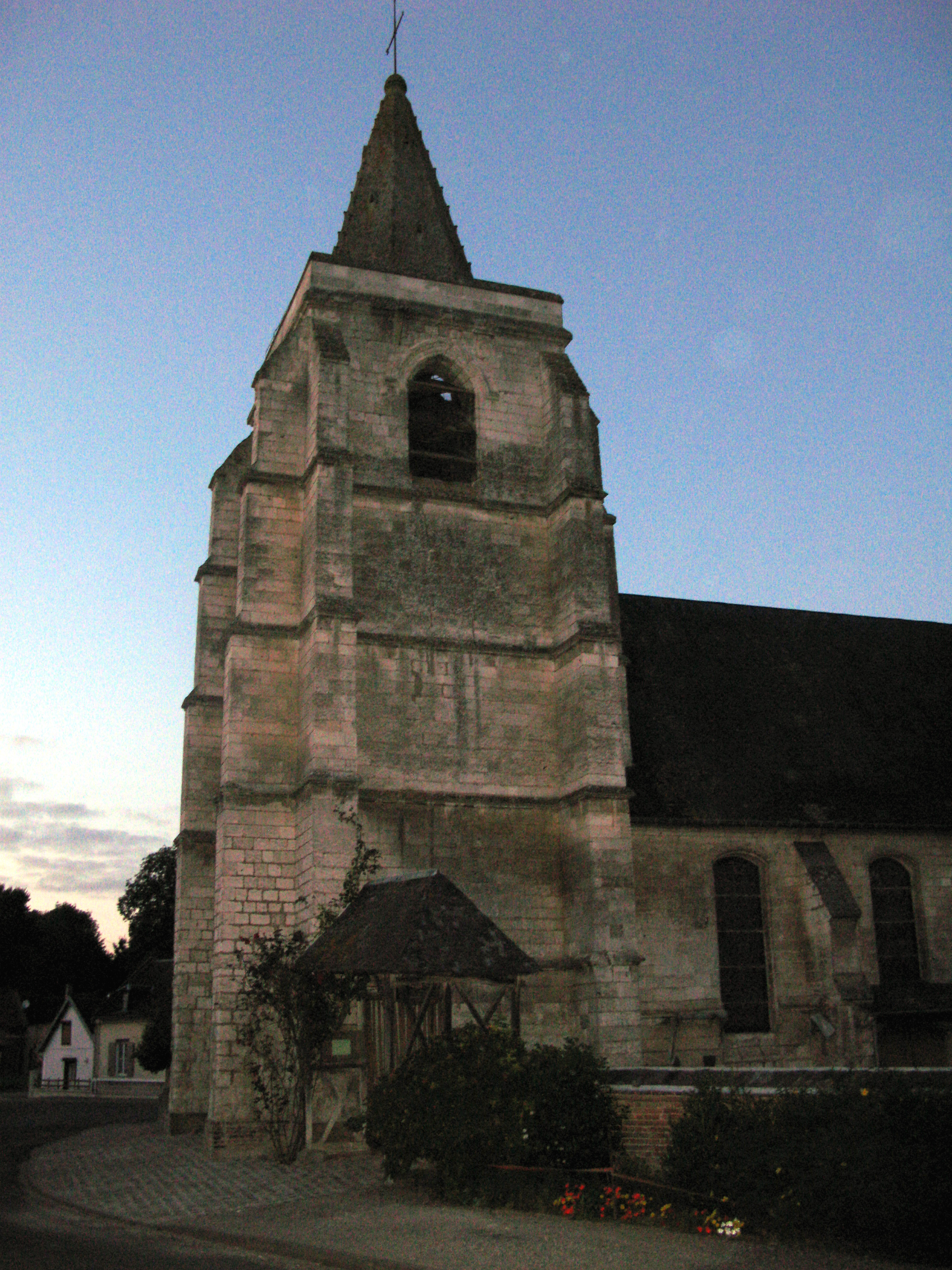
- The church in Franqueville

- Coat of arms
- Location of Franqueville
- Location within France Location within Hauts-de-France
- Coordinates: 50°05′42″N 2°06′28″E
- Country: France
- Region: Hauts-de-France
- Department: Somme
- Arrondissement: Amiens
- Canton: Flixecourt
- Intercommunality: CC Nièvre et Somme

Government
  - Mayor (2020–2026): Stéphane Colombel
- Area^{1}: 6.26 km^{2} (2.42 sq mi)
- Elevation: 69 m (226 ft)
- Highest elevation: 127 m (417 ft)
- Lowest elevation: 53 m (174 ft)
- Population (2023): 163
  - Density: 26.0/km^{2} (67.4/sq mi)
- Time zone: UTC+01:00 (CET)
  - Summer (DST): UTC+02:00 (CEST)
- INSEE/Postal code: 80346 /80620
- ^{1} French Land Register data, which excludes lakes, ponds, glaciers > 1 km^{2} (0.386 sq mi or 247 acres) and river estuaries.

Franqueville (French pronunciation: [fʁɑ̃kvil]; Picard: Franqville) is a commune in the Somme department in Hauts-de-France in northern France.

== Geography ==
Franqueville is situated on the D130 road, some 16 miles (26 km) east of Abbeville.

== Population ==
Historical population
Year	Pop.	±% p.a.
1968	120	—
1975	98	−2.85%
1982	87	−1.69%
1990	97	+1.37%
1999	108	+1.20%
2007	167	+5.60%
2012	167	+0.00%
2017	177	+1.17%
2023	163	−1.36%
Source: INSEE

== See also ==
- Communes of the Somme department
