= Vignacourt =

- Commune
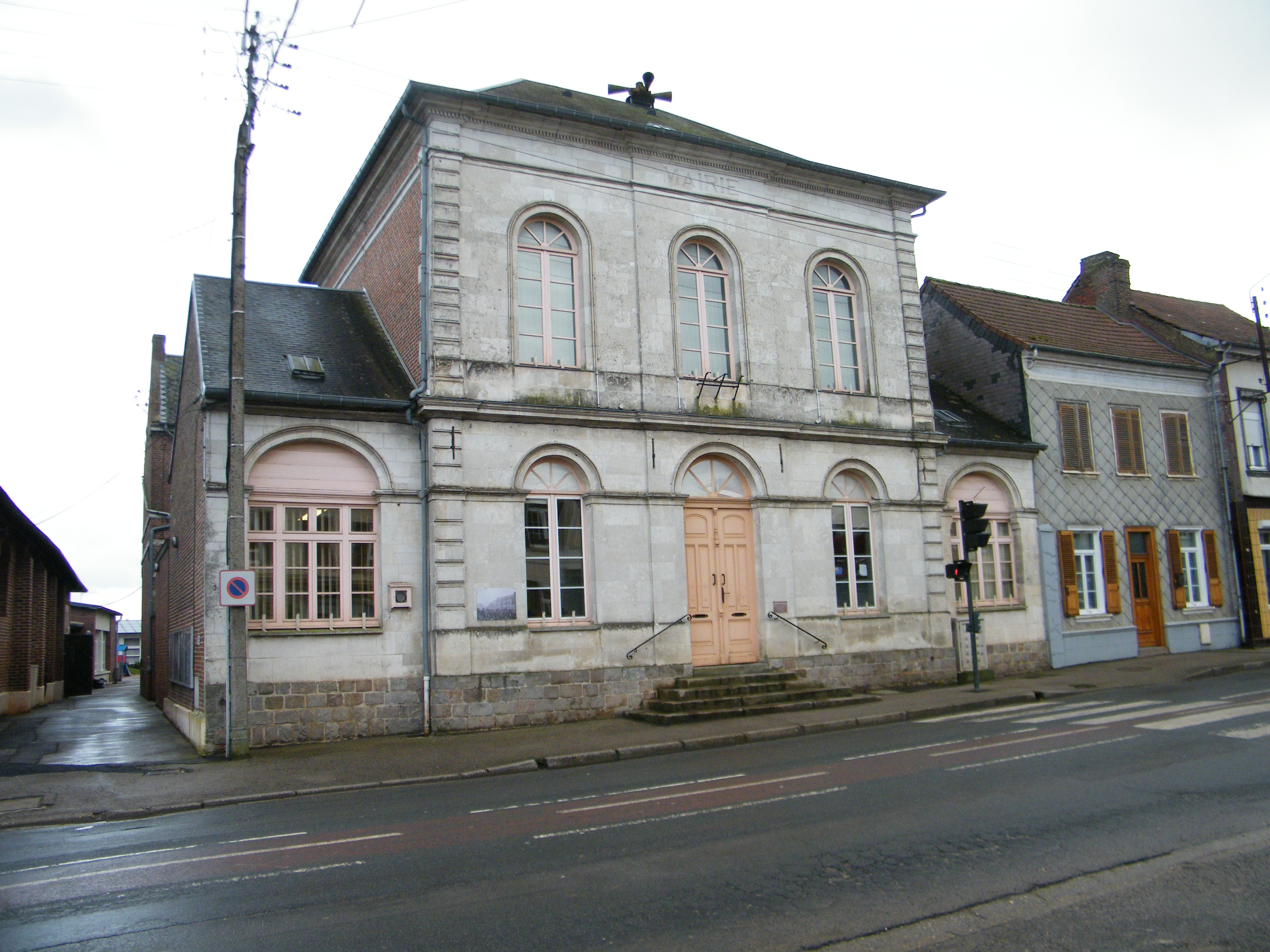
- The town hall in Vignacourt

- Coat of arms
- Location of Vignacourt
- Location within France Location within Hauts-de-France
- Coordinates: 50°00′43″N 2°11′45″E
- Country: France
- Region: Hauts-de-France
- Department: Somme
- Arrondissement: Amiens
- Canton: Flixecourt
- Intercommunality: CC Nièvre et Somme

Government
  - Mayor (2020–2026): Stéphane Ducrotoy
- Area^{1}: 29.1 km^{2} (11.2 sq mi)
- Elevation: 126 m (413 ft)
- Highest elevation: 134 m (440 ft)
- Lowest elevation: 37 m (121 ft)
- Population (2023): 2,263
  - Density: 77.8/km^{2} (201/sq mi)
- Time zone: UTC+01:00 (CET)
  - Summer (DST): UTC+02:00 (CEST)
- INSEE/Postal code: 80793 /80650
- ^{1} French Land Register data, which excludes lakes, ponds, glaciers > 1 km^{2} (0.386 sq mi or 247 acres) and river estuaries.

Vignacourt (French pronunciation: [viɲakuʁ]) is a commune in the Somme department in Hauts-de-France in northern France.

== Geography ==
Vignacourt is situated 10 miles (16 km) northwest of Amiens, on the D12 and D49 junction.

== Population ==
Historical population
Year	Pop.	±% p.a.
1968	1,828	—
1975	2,007	+1.34%
1982	2,369	+2.40%
1990	2,294	−0.40%
1999	2,183	−0.55%
2007	2,232	+0.28%
2012	2,430	+1.71%
2017	2,368	−0.52%
2023	2,263	−0.75%
Source: INSEE

== See also ==
- Communes of the Somme department
