= L'Étoile, Somme =

L'Étoile
- Commune
- Coat of arms
- Location of L'Étoile
- Location within France Location within Hauts-de-France
- Coordinates: 50°01′28″N 2°01′58″E
- Country: France
- Region: Hauts-de-France
- Department: Somme
- Arrondissement: Amiens
- Canton: Flixecourt
- Intercommunality: CC Nièvre et Somme

Government
  - Mayor (2020–2026): Ghislain Tirmarche
- Area^{1}: 7.9 km^{2} (3.1 sq mi)
- Elevation: 15 m (49 ft)
- Highest elevation: 113 m (371 ft)
- Lowest elevation: 7 m (23 ft)
- Population (2023): 1,128
  - Density: 140/km^{2} (370/sq mi)
- Time zone: UTC+01:00 (CET)
  - Summer (DST): UTC+02:00 (CEST)
- INSEE/Postal code: 80296 /80830
- ^{1} French Land Register data, which excludes lakes, ponds, glaciers > 1 km^{2} (0.386 sq mi or 247 acres) and river estuaries.

L'Étoile (French pronunciation: [letwal]; Picard: L'Étoèle) is a commune in the Somme department in Hauts-de-France in northern France.

== Geography ==
The commune is situated on the D216 road, on the banks of the river Somme, some 10 miles (16 km) northwest of Amiens.

== Population ==
Historical population
Year	Pop.	±% p.a.
1968	1,650	—
1975	1,554	−0.85%
1982	1,446	−1.02%
1990	1,334	−1.00%
1999	1,305	−0.24%
2007	1,241	−0.63%
2012	1,263	+0.35%
2017	1,194	−1.12%
2023	1,128	−0.94%
Source: INSEE

== Places of interest ==
The ruins of the Benedictine Priory of Moreaucourt

== See also ==
- Communes of the Somme department
