= Halloy-lès-Pernois =

- Commune
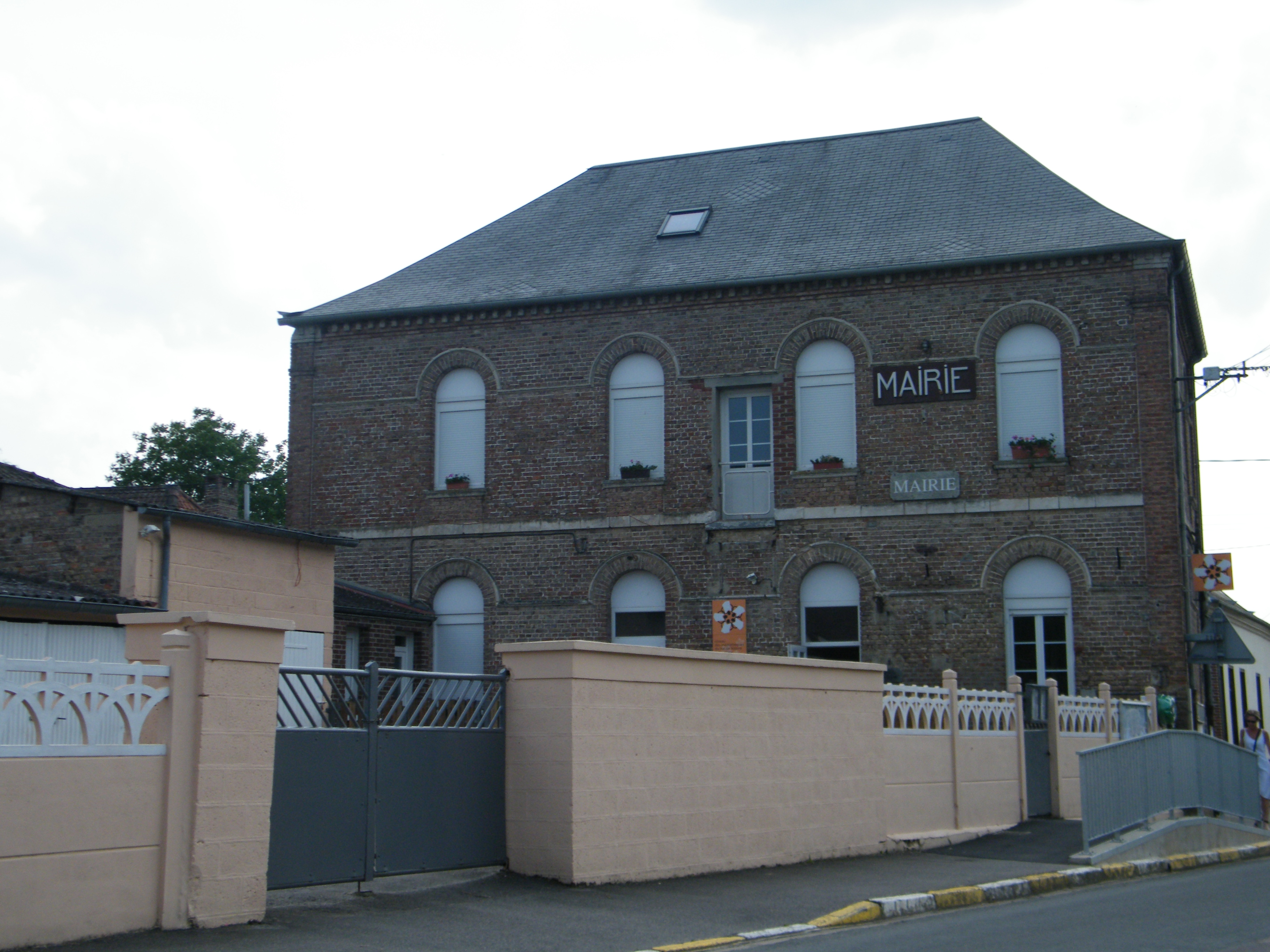
- The town hall in Halloy-lès-Pernois
- Location of Halloy-lès-Pernois
- Location within France Location within Hauts-de-France
- Coordinates: 50°03′01″N 2°11′52″E
- Country: France
- Region: Hauts-de-France
- Department: Somme
- Arrondissement: Amiens
- Canton: Flixecourt
- Intercommunality: CC Nièvre et Somme

Government
  - Mayor (2020–2026): Philippe Carpentier
- Area^{1}: 6.2 km^{2} (2.4 sq mi)
- Elevation: 42 m (138 ft)
- Highest elevation: 128 m (420 ft)
- Lowest elevation: 38 m (125 ft)
- Population (2023): 322
  - Density: 52/km^{2} (130/sq mi)
- Time zone: UTC+01:00 (CET)
  - Summer (DST): UTC+02:00 (CEST)
- INSEE/Postal code: 80408 /80670
- ^{1} French Land Register data, which excludes lakes, ponds, glaciers > 1 km^{2} (0.386 sq mi or 247 acres) and river estuaries.

Halloy-lès-Pernois is a commune in the Somme department in Hauts-de-France in northern France.

== Geography ==
The commune is situated on the D57 road, some 17 miles (27 km) northwest of Amiens.

== Population ==
Historical population
Year	Pop.	±% p.a.
1968	172	—
1975	195	+1.81%
1982	319	+7.28%
1990	341	+0.84%
1999	355	+0.45%
2007	367	+0.42%
2012	363	−0.22%
2017	343	−1.13%
2023	322	−1.05%
Source: INSEE

== See also ==
- Communes of the Somme department
