= Havernas =

- Commune
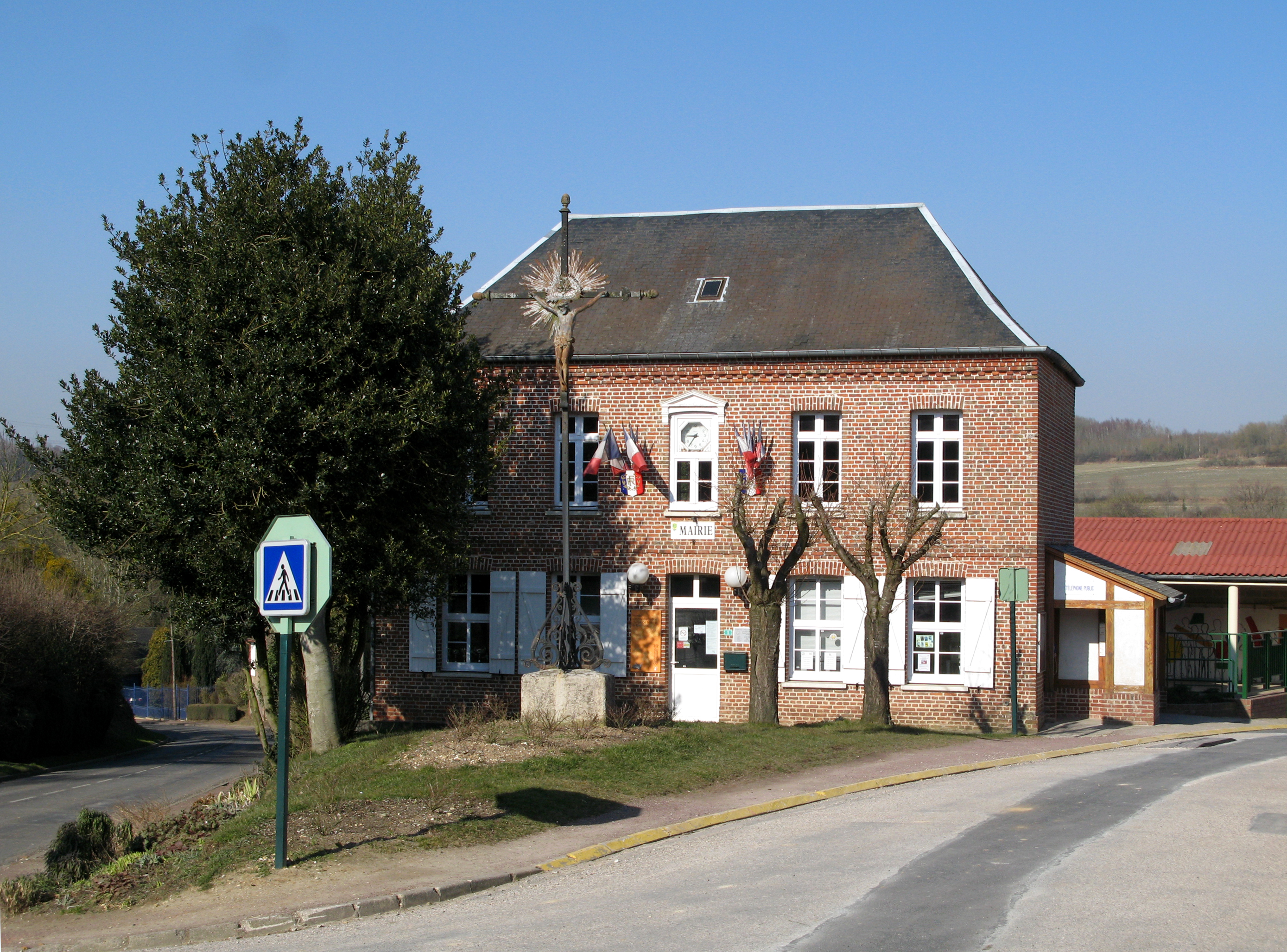
- The town hall in Havernas

- Coat of arms
- Location of Havernas
- Location within France Location within Hauts-de-France
- Coordinates: 50°02′14″N 2°14′12″E
- Country: France
- Region: Hauts-de-France
- Department: Somme
- Arrondissement: Amiens
- Canton: Flixecourt
- Intercommunality: CC Nièvre et Somme

Government
  - Mayor (2020–2026): Jean-Luc Madani Butin
- Area^{1}: 4.48 km^{2} (1.73 sq mi)
- Elevation: 100 m (330 ft)
- Highest elevation: 139 m (456 ft)
- Lowest elevation: 51 m (167 ft)
- Population (2023): 378
  - Density: 84.4/km^{2} (219/sq mi)
- Time zone: UTC+01:00 (CET)
  - Summer (DST): UTC+02:00 (CEST)
- INSEE/Postal code: 80423 /80670
- ^{1} French Land Register data, which excludes lakes, ponds, glaciers > 1 km^{2} (0.386 sq mi or 247 acres) and river estuaries.

Havernas is a commune in the Somme department in Hauts-de-France in northern France.

== Geography ==
Havernas is situated on the D933 road, some 12 miles (19 km) north of Amiens.

== Population ==
Historical population
Year	Pop.	±% p.a.
1968	133	—
1975	143	+1.04%
1982	297	+11.01%
1990	355	+2.25%
1999	375	+0.61%
2007	368	−0.24%
2012	418	+2.58%
2017	394	−1.18%
2023	378	−0.69%
Source: INSEE

== See also ==
- Communes of the Somme department
