= Canaples =

- Commune
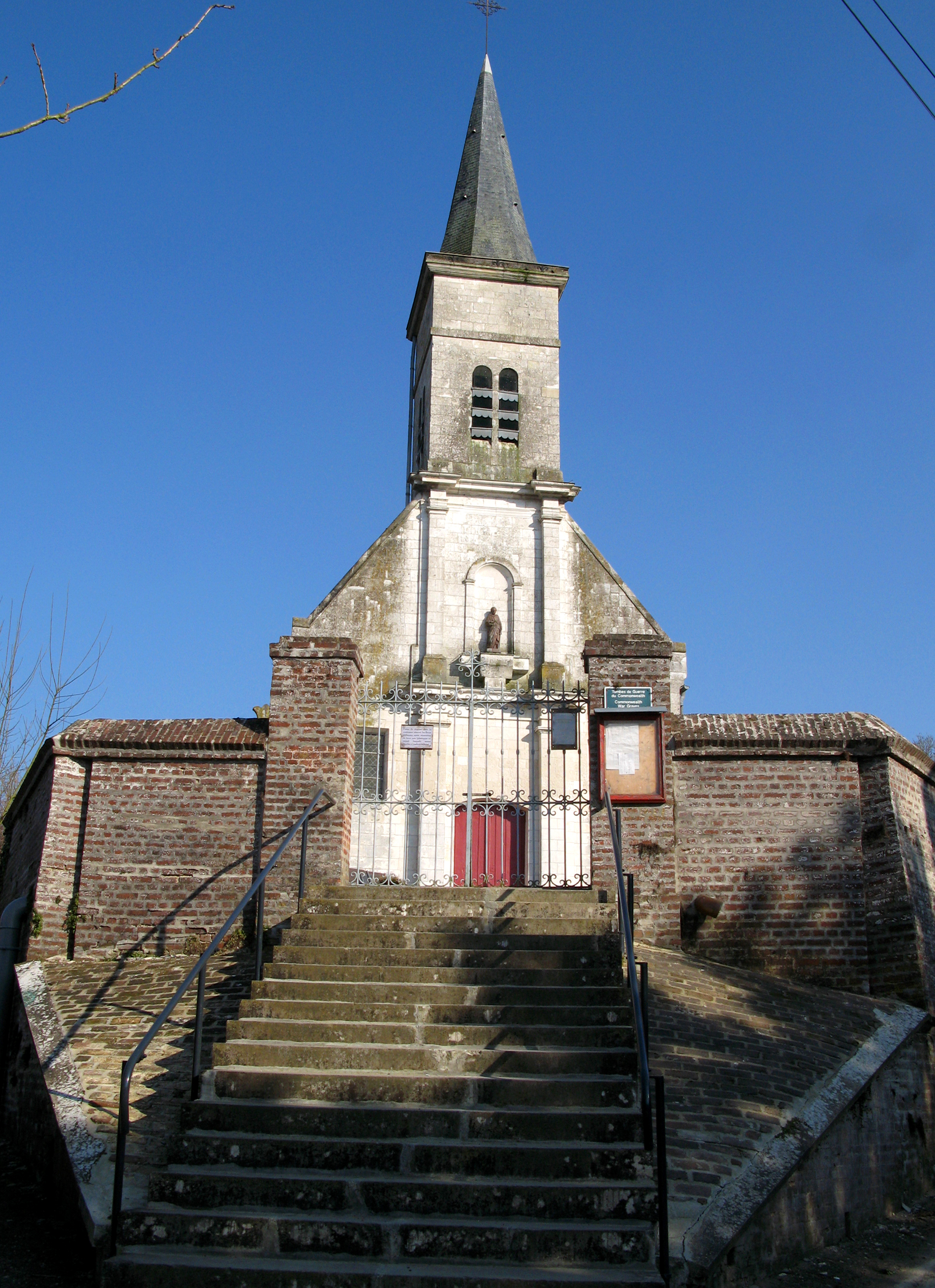
- The church in Canaples

- Coat of arms
- Location of Canaples
- Location within France Location within Hauts-de-France
- Coordinates: 50°03′26″N 2°13′07″E
- Country: France
- Region: Hauts-de-France
- Department: Somme
- Arrondissement: Amiens
- Canton: Flixecourt
- Intercommunality: CC Nièvre et Somme

Government
  - Mayor (2020–2026): Marcel Poisson
- Area^{1}: 10.26 km^{2} (3.96 sq mi)
- Elevation: 54 m (177 ft)
- Highest elevation: 153 m (502 ft)
- Lowest elevation: 40 m (130 ft)
- Population (2023): 705
  - Density: 68.7/km^{2} (178/sq mi)
- Time zone: UTC+01:00 (CET)
  - Summer (DST): UTC+02:00 (CEST)
- INSEE/Postal code: 80166 /80670
- ^{1} French Land Register data, which excludes lakes, ponds, glaciers > 1 km^{2} (0.386 sq mi or 247 acres) and river estuaries.

Canaples (French pronunciation: [kanapl]; Picard: Quénape) is a commune in the Somme department in Hauts-de-France in northern France.

== Geography ==
Canaples is situated on the D933 road, some 15 miles (24 km) north of Amiens.

== Population ==
Historical population
Year	Pop.	±% p.a.
1968	452	—
1975	529	+2.27%
1982	566	+0.97%
1990	604	+0.82%
1999	596	−0.15%
2007	607	+0.23%
2012	628	+0.68%
2017	706	+2.37%
2023	705	−0.02%
Source: INSEE

== Places of interest ==
- The public Gardens

== See also ==
- Communes of the Somme department
