= Bouchon, Somme =

Bouchon
- Commune
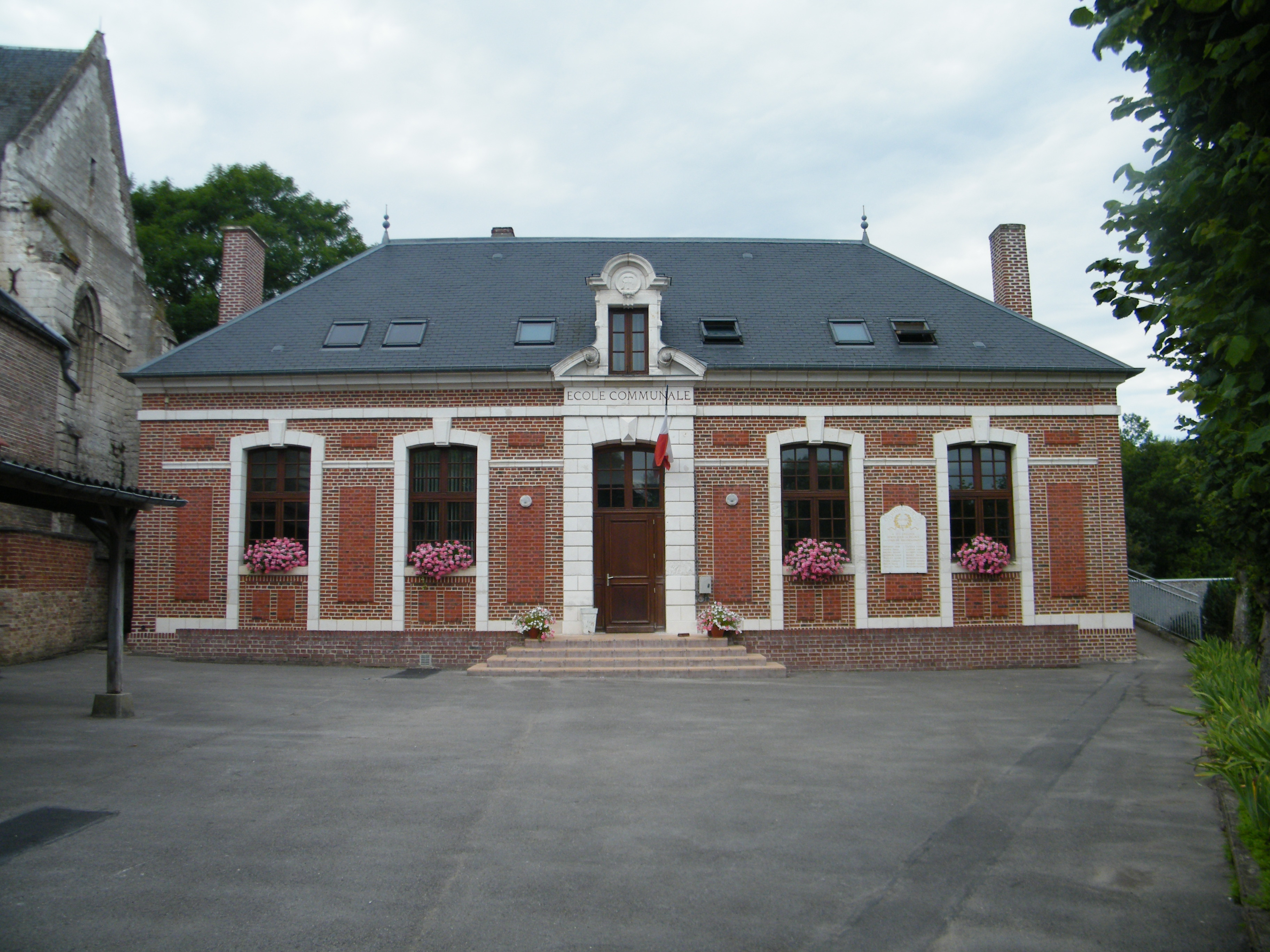
- The town hall in Bouchon

- Coat of arms
- Location of Bouchon
- Location within France Location within Hauts-de-France
- Coordinates: 50°02′08″N 2°01′51″E
- Country: France
- Region: Hauts-de-France
- Department: Somme
- Arrondissement: Amiens
- Canton: Flixecourt
- Intercommunality: CC Nièvre et Somme

Government
  - Mayor (2020–2026): Etienne Vignon
- Area^{1}: 4.6 km^{2} (1.8 sq mi)
- Elevation: 23 m (75 ft)
- Highest elevation: 105 m (344 ft)
- Lowest elevation: 15 m (49 ft)
- Population (2023): 158
  - Density: 34/km^{2} (89/sq mi)
- Time zone: UTC+01:00 (CET)
  - Summer (DST): UTC+02:00 (CEST)
- INSEE/Postal code: 80117 /80830
- ^{1} French Land Register data, which excludes lakes, ponds, glaciers > 1 km^{2} (0.386 sq mi or 247 acres) and river estuaries.

Bouchon (French pronunciation: [buʃɔ̃]) is a commune in the Somme department in Hauts-de-France in northern France.

== Geography ==
Bouchon is situated on the D216 road, by the banks of the river Somme, about 15 miles (24 km) southeast of Abbeville.

== Population ==
Historical population
Year	Pop.	±% p.a.
1968	129	—
1975	145	+1.68%
1982	163	+1.69%
1990	135	−2.33%
1999	140	+0.40%
2007	152	+1.03%
2012	151	−0.13%
2017	155	+0.52%
2023	158	+0.32%
Source: INSEE

== See also ==
- Communes of the Somme department
