= Belloy-sur-Somme =

- Commune
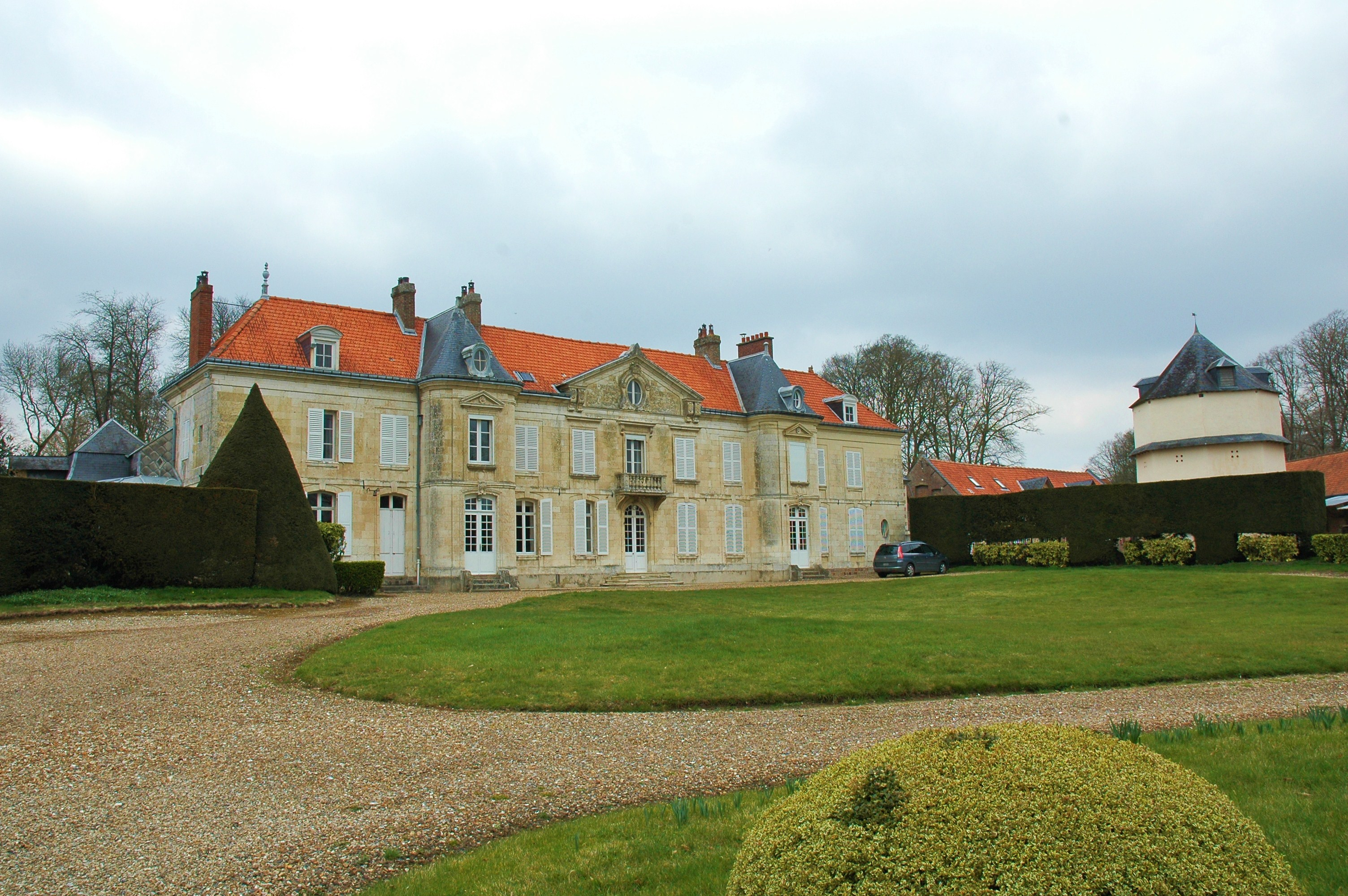
- Belloy castle
- Location of Belloy-sur-Somme
- Location within France Location within Hauts-de-France
- Coordinates: 49°57′59″N 2°08′02″E
- Country: France
- Region: Hauts-de-France
- Department: Somme
- Arrondissement: Amiens
- Canton: Ailly-sur-Somme
- Intercommunality: CC Nièvre et Somme

Government
  - Mayor (2020–2026): Jean-Luc Herbette
- Area^{1}: 13.24 km^{2} (5.11 sq mi)
- Elevation: 30 m (98 ft)
- Highest elevation: 109 m (358 ft)
- Lowest elevation: 12 m (39 ft)
- Population (2023): 717
  - Density: 54.2/km^{2} (140/sq mi)
- Time zone: UTC+01:00 (CET)
  - Summer (DST): UTC+02:00 (CEST)
- INSEE/Postal code: 80082 /80310
- ^{1} French Land Register data, which excludes lakes, ponds, glaciers > 1 km^{2} (0.386 sq mi or 247 acres) and river estuaries.

Belloy-sur-Somme (French pronunciation: [bɛlwa syʁ sɔm], literally Belloy on Somme; Picard: Belloy-su-Sonme) is a commune in the Somme department in Hauts-de-France in northern France.

== Geography ==
The commune is situated on the banks of the Somme by the N235 road, some 10 miles (16 km) northwest of Amiens.

== Population ==
Historical population
Year	Pop.	±% p.a.
1968	547	—
1975	570	+0.59%
1982	620	+1.21%
1990	733	+2.11%
1999	788	+0.81%
2007	730	−0.95%
2012	773	+1.15%
2017	752	−0.55%
2023	717	−0.79%
Source: INSEE

== See also ==
- Communes of the Somme department
