= Berteaucourt-les-Dames =

- Commune
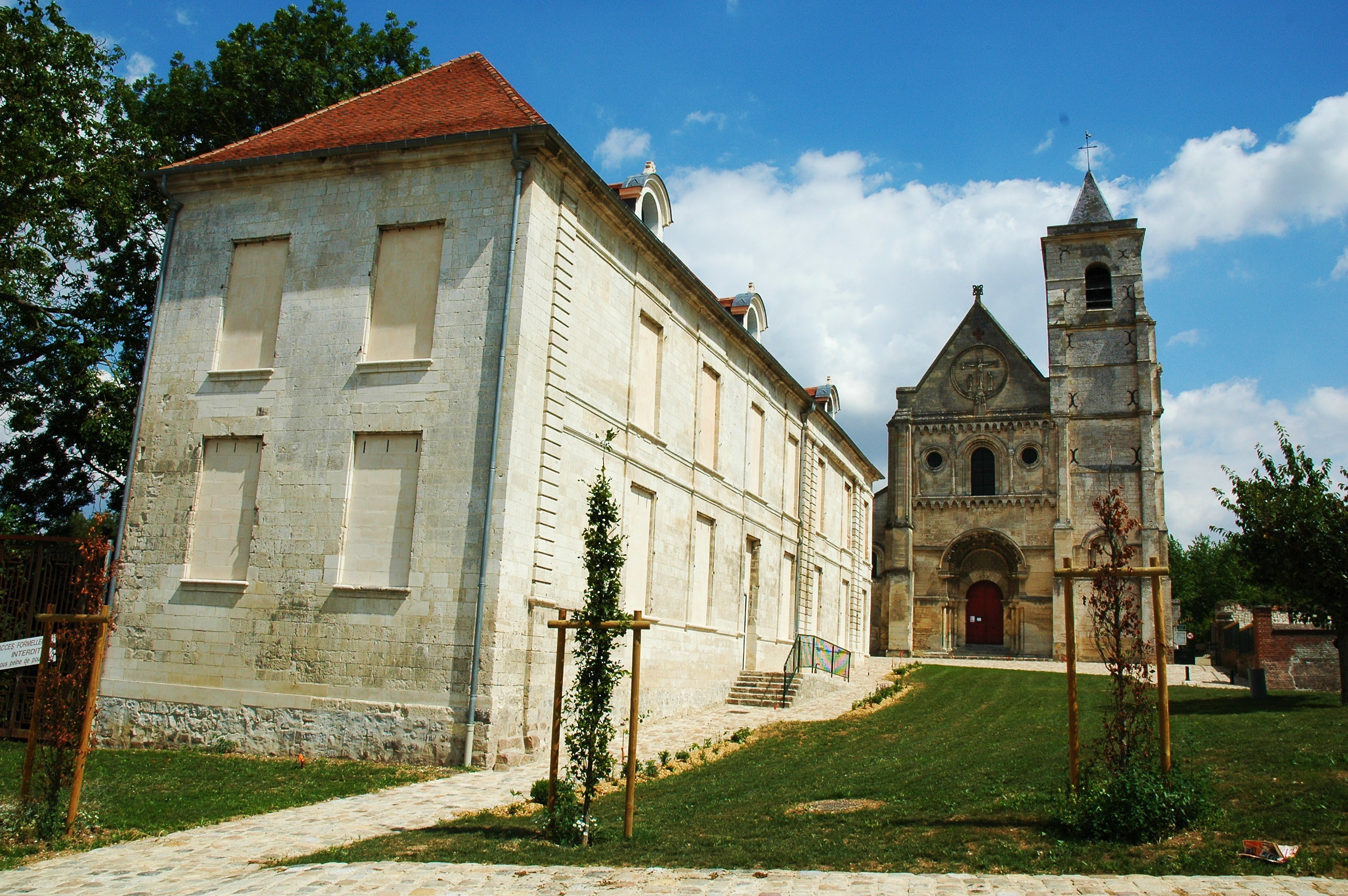
- The abbey and church in Berteaucourt-les-Dames

- Coat of arms
- Location of Berteaucourt-les-Dames
- Location within France Location within Hauts-de-France
- Coordinates: 50°02′51″N 2°09′13″E
- Country: France
- Region: Hauts-de-France
- Department: Somme
- Arrondissement: Amiens
- Canton: Flixecourt
- Intercommunality: CC Nièvre et Somme

Government
  - Mayor (2025–2026): Brigitte Lepoix
- Area^{1}: 4.64 km^{2} (1.79 sq mi)
- Elevation: 28 m (92 ft)
- Highest elevation: 122 m (400 ft)
- Lowest elevation: 24 m (79 ft)
- Population (2023): 1,092
  - Density: 235/km^{2} (610/sq mi)
- Time zone: UTC+01:00 (CET)
  - Summer (DST): UTC+02:00 (CEST)
- INSEE/Postal code: 80093 /80850
- ^{1} French Land Register data, which excludes lakes, ponds, glaciers > 1 km^{2} (0.386 sq mi or 247 acres) and river estuaries.

Berteaucourt-les-Dames (Picard: Bértécourt-chés-Danmes) is a commune in the Somme department in Hauts-de-France in northern France.

== Geography ==
The commune is situated at the junction of the D12 and the D57 roads, between Amiens and Abbeville.

== Population ==
Historical population
| Year | Pop. | ±% p.a. |
|---|---|---|
| 1968 | 1,149 | — |
| 1975 | 1,067 | −1.05% |
| 1982 | 1,044 | −0.31% |
| 1990 | 1,116 | +0.84% |
| 1999 | 1,109 | −0.07% |
| 2007 | 1,154 | +0.50% |
| 2012 | 1,136 | −0.31% |
| 2017 | 1,162 | +0.45% |
| 2023 | 1,092 | −1.03% |
Source: INSEE

== Places of interest ==
- Benedictine Abbey of St. Mary (Abbaye Sainte-Marie de Berteaucourt).

== See also ==
- Communes of the Somme department
