= Surcamps =

- Commune
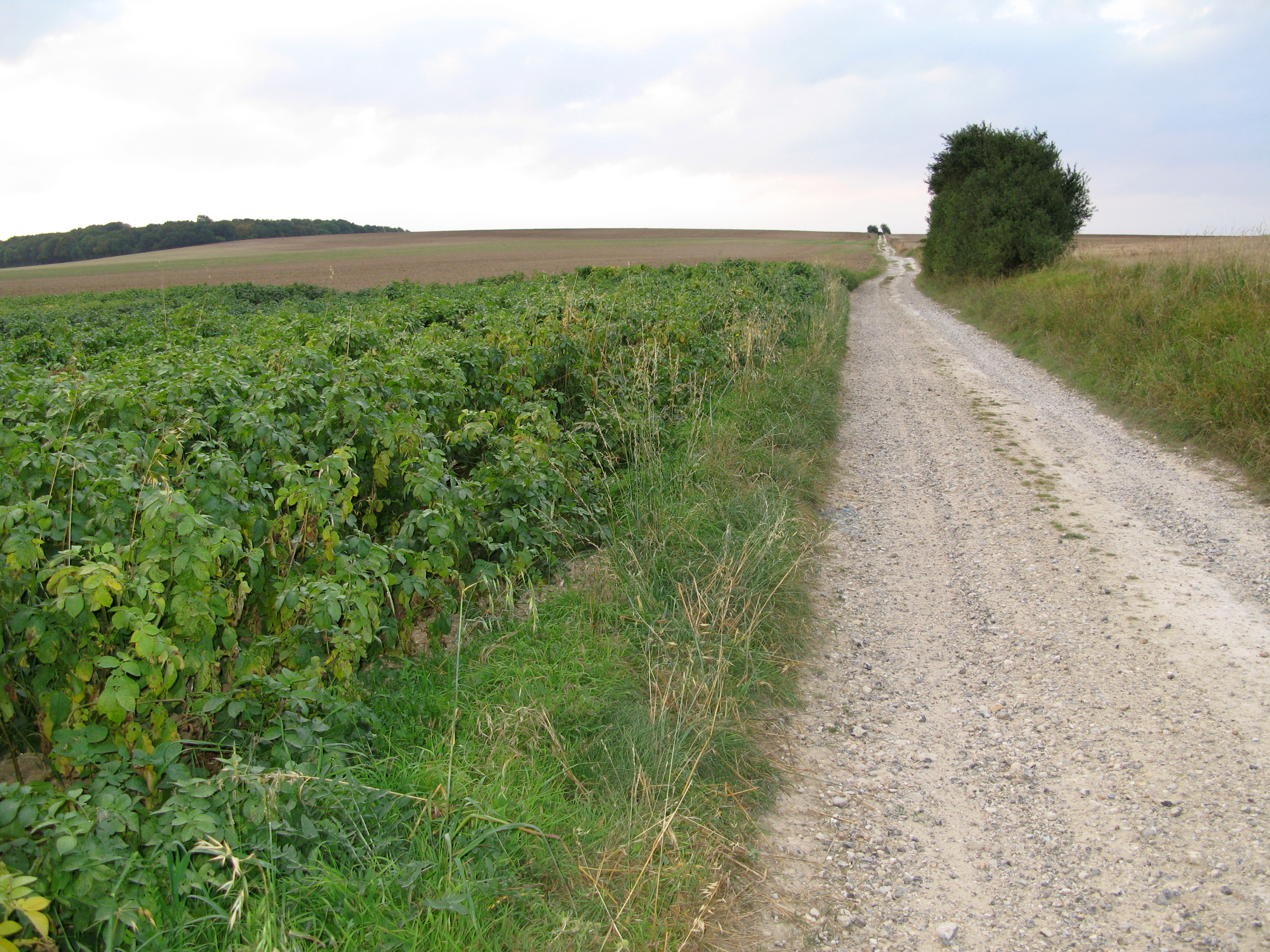
- The old Roman road
- Location of Surcamps
- Location within France Location within Hauts-de-France
- Coordinates: 50°04′13″N 2°04′32″E
- Country: France
- Region: Hauts-de-France
- Department: Somme
- Arrondissement: Amiens
- Canton: Flixecourt
- Intercommunality: CC Nièvre et Somme

Government
  - Mayor (2020–2026): Dominique Boullet
- Area^{1}: 2.97 km^{2} (1.15 sq mi)
- Elevation: 110 m (360 ft)
- Highest elevation: 117 m (384 ft)
- Lowest elevation: 63 m (207 ft)
- Population (2023): 84
  - Density: 28/km^{2} (73/sq mi)
- Time zone: UTC+01:00 (CET)
  - Summer (DST): UTC+02:00 (CEST)
- INSEE/Postal code: 80742 /80620
- ^{1} French Land Register data, which excludes lakes, ponds, glaciers > 1 km^{2} (0.386 sq mi or 247 acres) and river estuaries.

Surcamps (French pronunciation: [syʁkɑ̃]) is a commune located in the Somme department, Hauts-de-France, northern France.

== Geography ==
Surcamps is situated 10 miles (16 km) southeast of Amiens, on the D216e road, by the side of the old Roman road, the Chaussée Brunehaut.

== Population ==
Historical population
Year	Pop.	±% p.a.
1968	67	—
1975	82	+2.93%
1982	73	−1.65%
1990	64	−1.63%
1999	56	−1.47%
2007	69	+2.64%
2012	74	+1.41%
2017	64	−2.86%
2023	84	+4.64%
Source: INSEE

== Places of interest ==
- The nineteenth century church
- Traces of Gallo-Roman settlements
- The wood of Coroy, where the well-preserved remains of a Nazi V-1 flying bomb launch site is situated. Built by French prisoners in the summer of 1943, it was bombed 12 times by the Allies from December 1943 until April 1944.

== See also ==
- Communes of the Somme department
