= Pernois =

- Commune
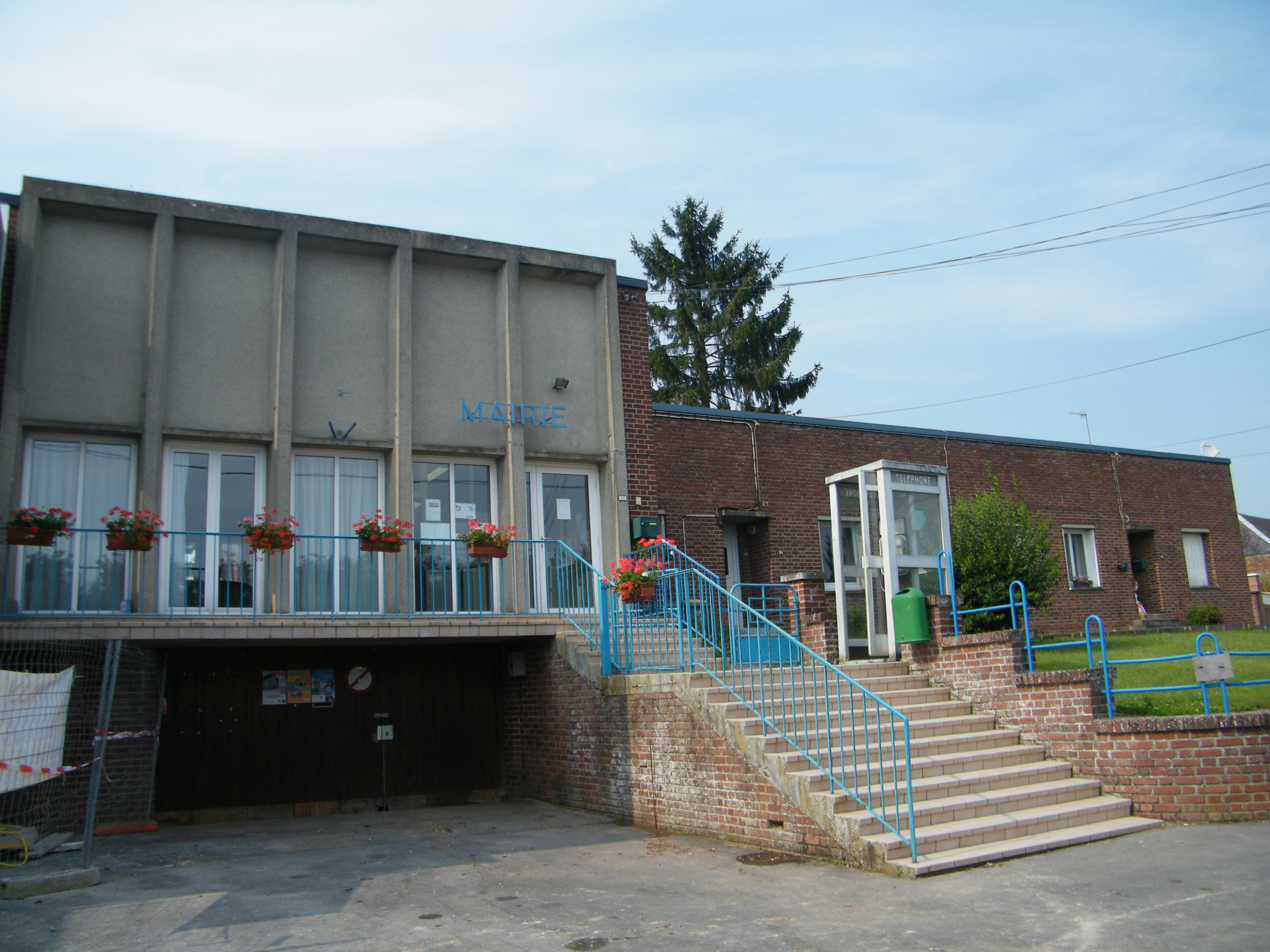
- The town hall in Pernois
- Location of Pernois
- Location within France Location within Hauts-de-France
- Coordinates: 50°03′11″N 2°11′07″E
- Country: France
- Region: Hauts-de-France
- Department: Somme
- Arrondissement: Amiens
- Canton: Flixecourt
- Intercommunality: CC Nièvre et Somme

Government
  - Mayor (2020–2026): Eric Olivier
- Area^{1}: 8.83 km^{2} (3.41 sq mi)
- Elevation: 39 m (128 ft)
- Highest elevation: 143 m (469 ft)
- Lowest elevation: 31 m (102 ft)
- Population (2023): 686
  - Density: 77.7/km^{2} (201/sq mi)
- Time zone: UTC+01:00 (CET)
  - Summer (DST): UTC+02:00 (CEST)
- INSEE/Postal code: 80619 /80670
- ^{1} French Land Register data, which excludes lakes, ponds, glaciers > 1 km^{2} (0.386 sq mi or 247 acres) and river estuaries.

Pernois (French pronunciation: [pɛʁnwa]) is a commune in the Somme department in Hauts-de-France in northern France.

== Geography ==
Pernois is situated on the D57 road, some 13 miles (21 km) northwest of Amiens.

== Population ==
Historical population
Year	Pop.	±% p.a.
1968	430	—
1975	416	−0.47%
1982	508	+2.90%
1990	634	+2.81%
1999	645	+0.19%
2007	716	+1.31%
2012	722	+0.17%
2017	735	+0.36%
2023	686	−1.14%
Source: INSEE

== See also ==
- Communes of the Somme department
