= Le Mesge =

- Commune
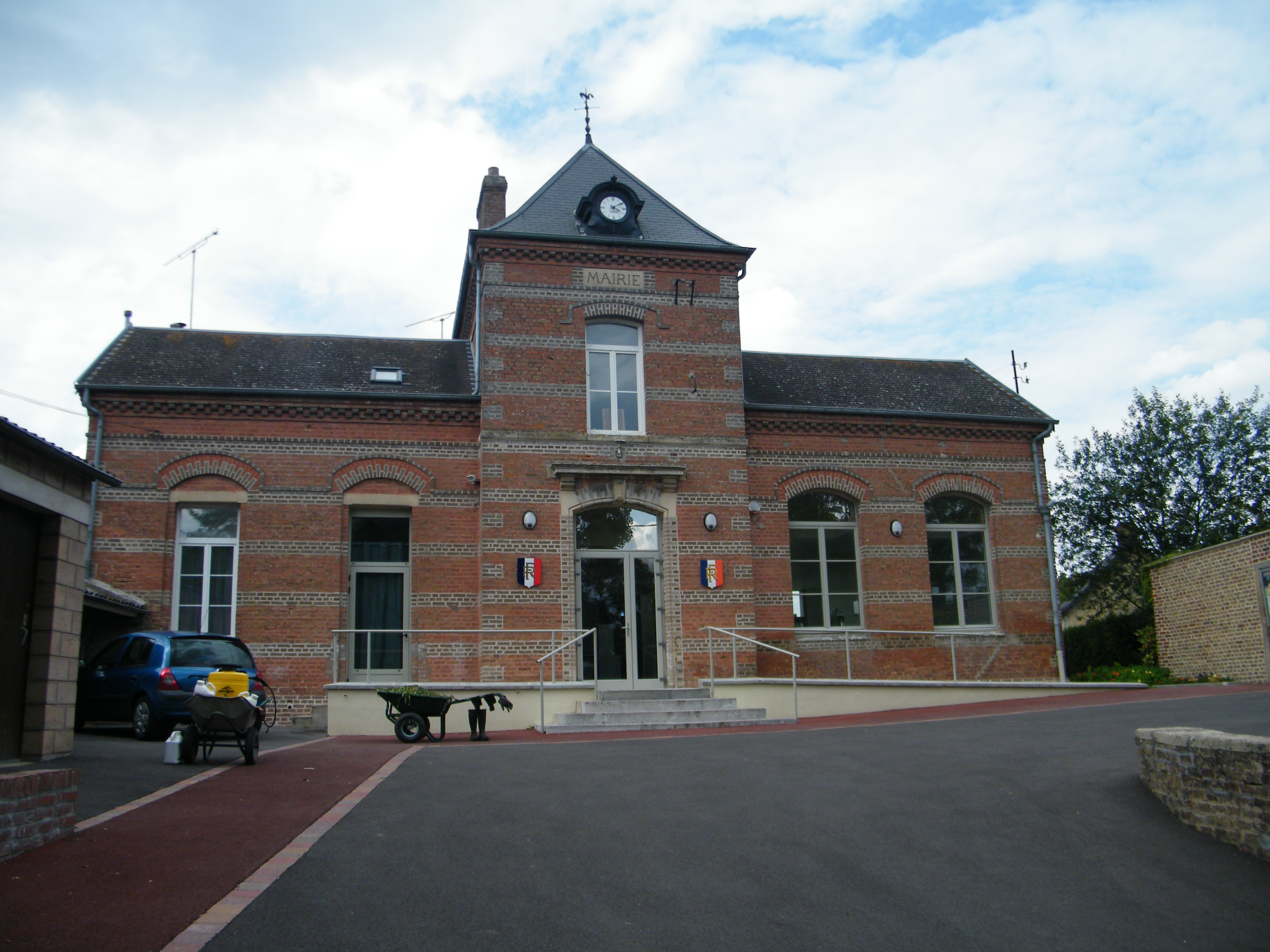
- The town hall in Le Mesge

- Coat of arms
- Location of Le Mesge
- Location within France Location within Hauts-de-France
- Coordinates: 49°56′45″N 2°03′14″E
- Country: France
- Region: Hauts-de-France
- Department: Somme
- Arrondissement: Amiens
- Canton: Ailly-sur-Somme
- Intercommunality: CC Nièvre et Somme

Government
  - Mayor (2020–2026): Bertrand Blaisel
- Area^{1}: 8.73 km^{2} (3.37 sq mi)
- Elevation: 73 m (240 ft)
- Highest elevation: 112 m (367 ft)
- Lowest elevation: 25 m (82 ft)
- Population (2023): 144
  - Density: 16.5/km^{2} (42.7/sq mi)
- Time zone: UTC+01:00 (CET)
  - Summer (DST): UTC+02:00 (CEST)
- INSEE/Postal code: 80535 /80310
- ^{1} French Land Register data, which excludes lakes, ponds, glaciers > 1 km^{2} (0.386 sq mi or 247 acres) and river estuaries.

Le Mesge (French pronunciation: [lə mɛʒ]) is a commune in the Somme department in Hauts-de-France in northern France.

== Geography ==
Le Mesge is situated on the D69 road, some 13 miles (21 km) northwest of Amiens.

== Population ==
Historical population
Year	Pop.	±% p.a.
1968	188	—
1975	165	−1.85%
1982	153	−1.07%
1990	156	+0.24%
1999	150	−0.43%
2007	172	+1.73%
2012	186	+1.58%
2017	176	−1.10%
2023	144	−3.29%
Source: INSEE

== See also ==
- Communes of the Somme department
