= Lanches-Saint-Hilaire =

- Commune
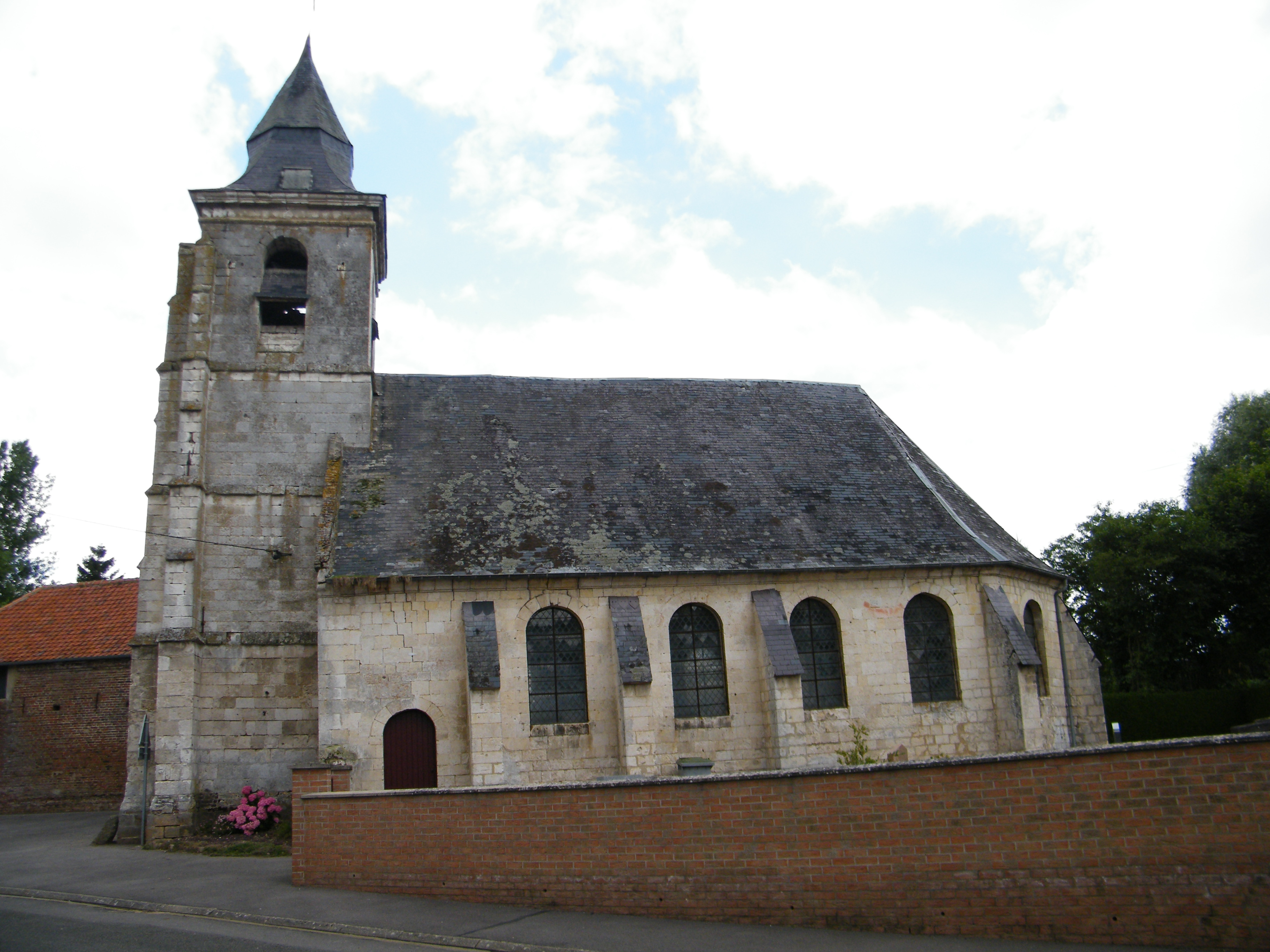
- The church in Lanches-Saint-Hilaire
- Location of Lanches-Saint-Hilaire
- Location within France Location within Hauts-de-France
- Coordinates: 50°06′15″N 2°08′25″E
- Country: France
- Region: Hauts-de-France
- Department: Somme
- Arrondissement: Amiens
- Canton: Flixecourt
- Intercommunality: CC Nièvre et Somme

Government
  - Mayor (2020–2026): Jean-Luc Waligora
- Area^{1}: 5.45 km^{2} (2.10 sq mi)
- Elevation: 76 m (249 ft)
- Highest elevation: 136 m (446 ft)
- Lowest elevation: 48 m (157 ft)
- Population (2023): 133
  - Density: 24.4/km^{2} (63.2/sq mi)
- Time zone: UTC+01:00 (CET)
  - Summer (DST): UTC+02:00 (CEST)
- INSEE/Postal code: 80466 /80620
- ^{1} French Land Register data, which excludes lakes, ponds, glaciers > 1 km^{2} (0.386 sq mi or 247 acres) and river estuaries.

Lanches-Saint-Hilaire (French pronunciation: [lɑ̃ʃ sɛ̃.t‿ilɛʁ]; Picard: Lanche-Saint-Hilaire) is a commune in the Somme department in Hauts-de-France in northern France.

== Geography ==
The commune is situated on the D118e road, some 15 miles (24 km) east of Abbeville.

== Population ==
Historical population
Year	Pop.	±% p.a.
1968	103	—
1975	95	−1.15%
1982	69	−4.47%
1990	93	+3.80%
1999	109	+1.78%
2007	120	+1.21%
2012	125	+0.82%
2017	131	+0.94%
2023	133	+0.25%
Source: INSEE

== See also ==
- Communes of the Somme department
