= Domart-en-Ponthieu =

- Commune
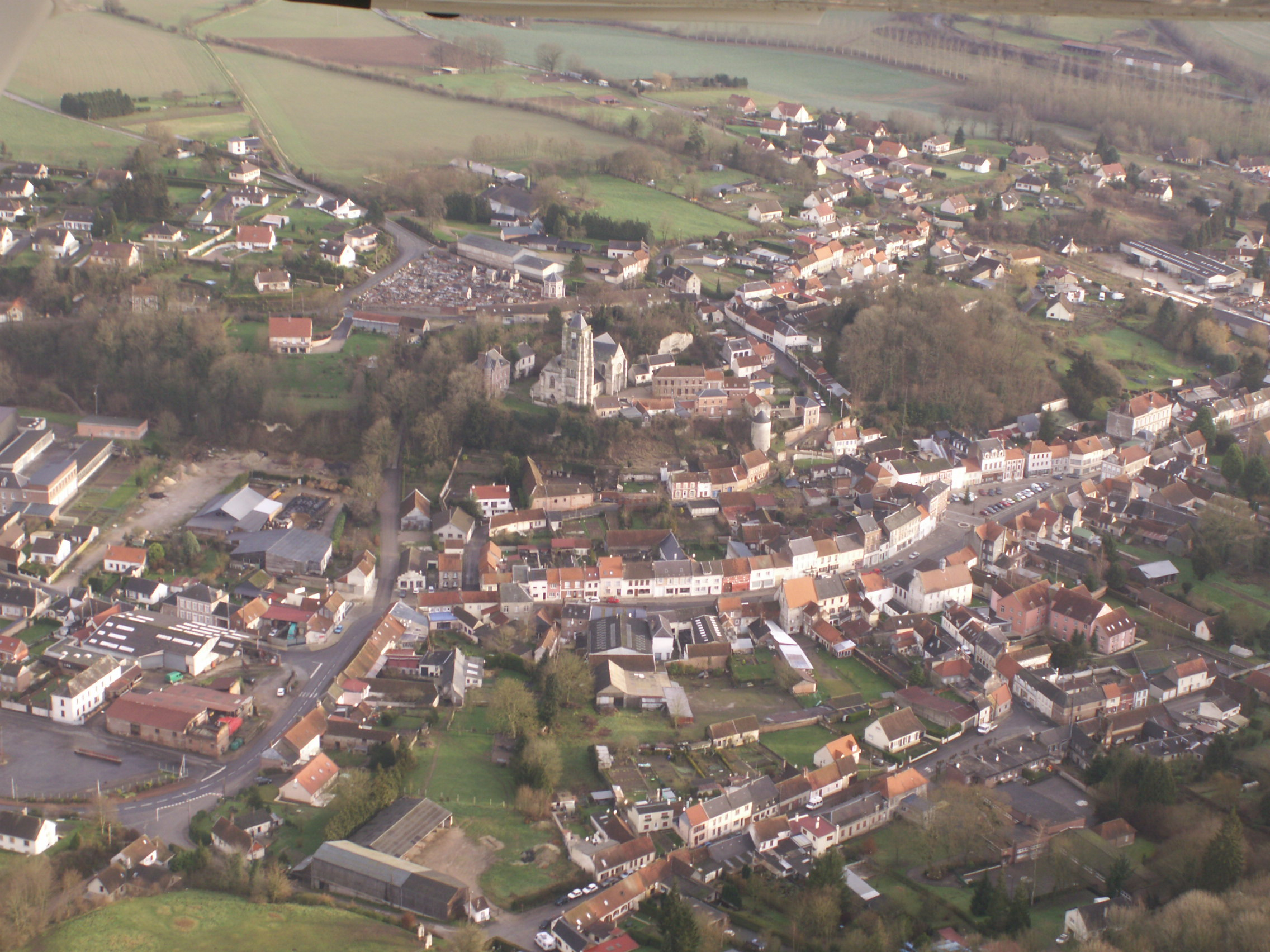
- An aerial view of Domart-en-Ponthieu

- Coat of arms
- Location of Domart-en-Ponthieu
- Location within France Location within Hauts-de-France
- Coordinates: 50°04′31″N 2°07′34″E
- Country: France
- Region: Hauts-de-France
- Department: Somme
- Arrondissement: Amiens
- Canton: Flixecourt
- Intercommunality: CC Nièvre et Somme

Government
  - Mayor (2020–2026): Nicolas Maréchal
- Area^{1}: 17.93 km^{2} (6.92 sq mi)
- Elevation: 44 m (144 ft)
- Highest elevation: 132 m (433 ft)
- Lowest elevation: 32 m (105 ft)
- Population (2023): 1,081
  - Density: 60.29/km^{2} (156.2/sq mi)
- Time zone: UTC+01:00 (CET)
  - Summer (DST): UTC+02:00 (CEST)
- INSEE/Postal code: 80241 /80620
- ^{1} French Land Register data, which excludes lakes, ponds, glaciers > 1 km^{2} (0.386 sq mi or 247 acres) and river estuaries.

Domart-en-Ponthieu (French pronunciation: [dɔmaʁ ɑ̃ pɔ̃tjø], literally Domart in Ponthieu; Picard: Donmart-in-Pontiu) is a commune in the Somme department in Hauts-de-France in northern France.

== Geography ==
The commune is situated on the D216 road, some 14 miles (23 km) southeast of Abbeville.

== History ==
After the Armistice following World War I, British troops from the Oxfordshire and Buckinghamshire Light Infantry were stationed at Domart-en-Ponthieu under the command of a Colonel Flanagan. Awaiting demobilisation, they were able to relax for a time. Private Arthur Bullock recalled this stay, including a memorable occasion on which he heard a talk by the renowned Woodbine Willie.

== Population ==
Historical population
Year	Pop.	±% p.a.
1968	1,150	—
1975	1,152	+0.02%
1982	1,175	+0.28%
1990	1,107	−0.74%
1999	1,126	+0.19%
2007	1,163	+0.40%
2012	1,158	−0.09%
2017	1,094	−1.13%
2023	1,081	−0.20%
Source: INSEE

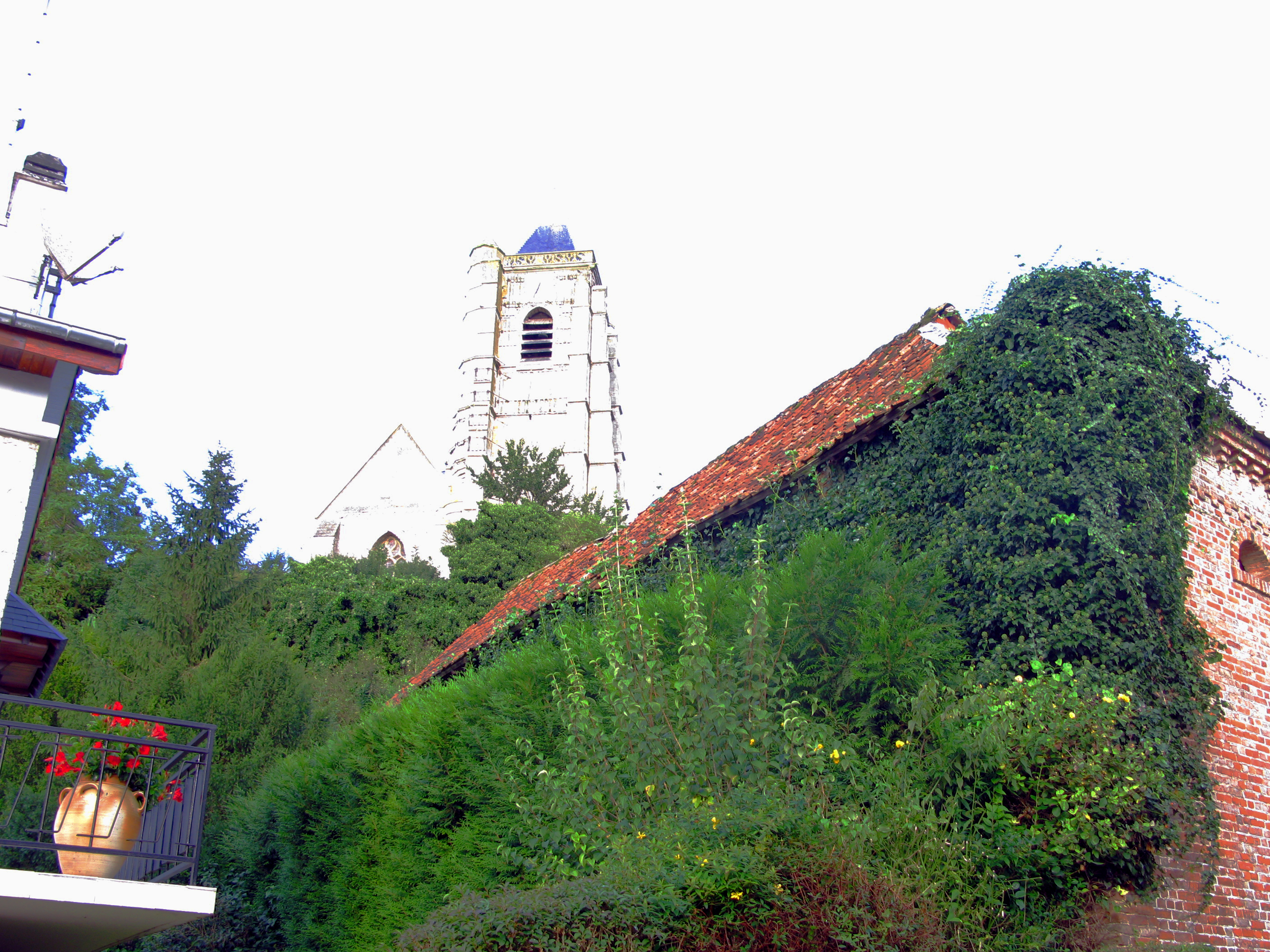
The church in its verdant setting

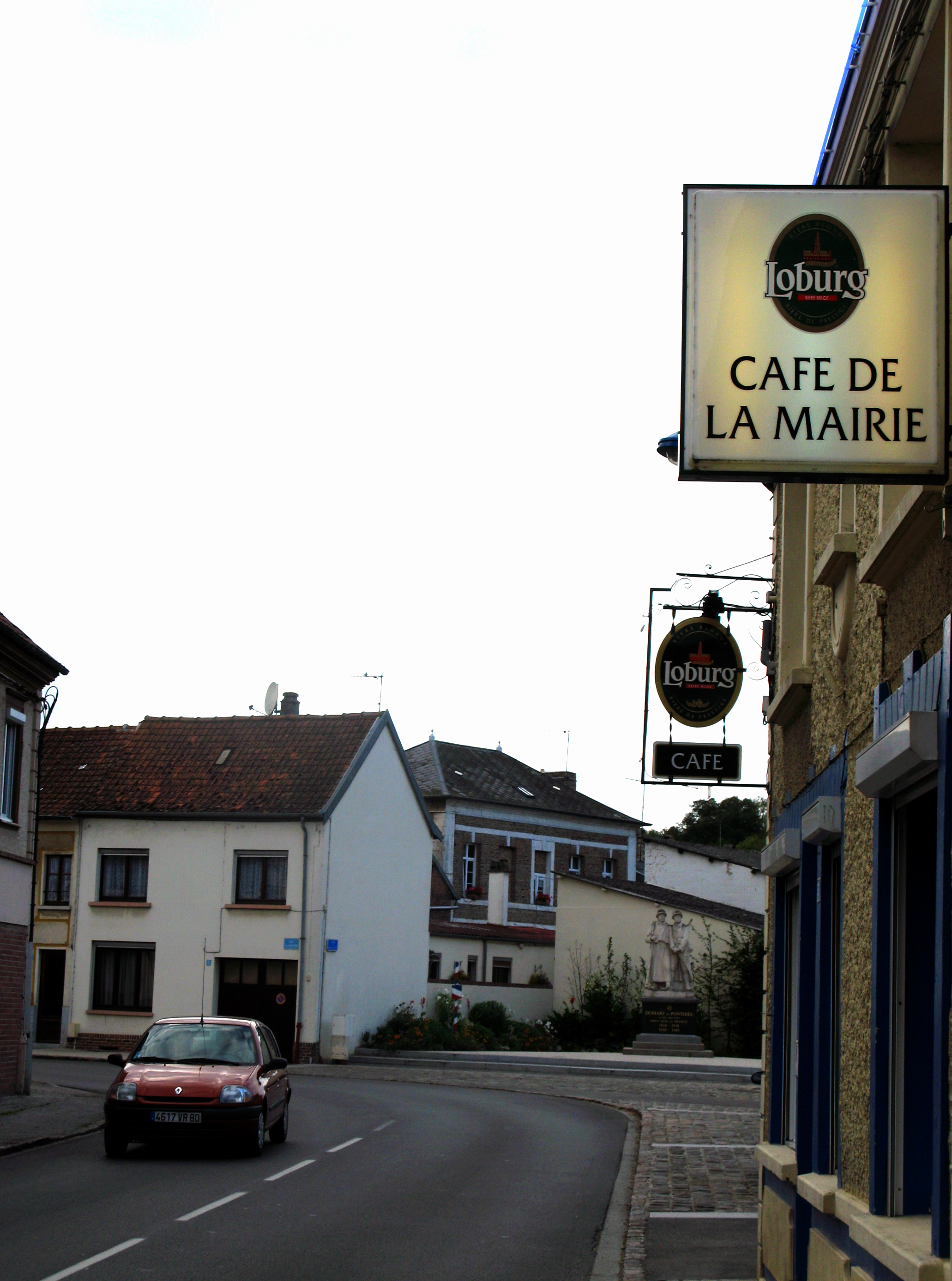
The war memorial

== Places of interest ==
- The Templars house
- The round tower (remains of the château)
- Church
- The war memorial
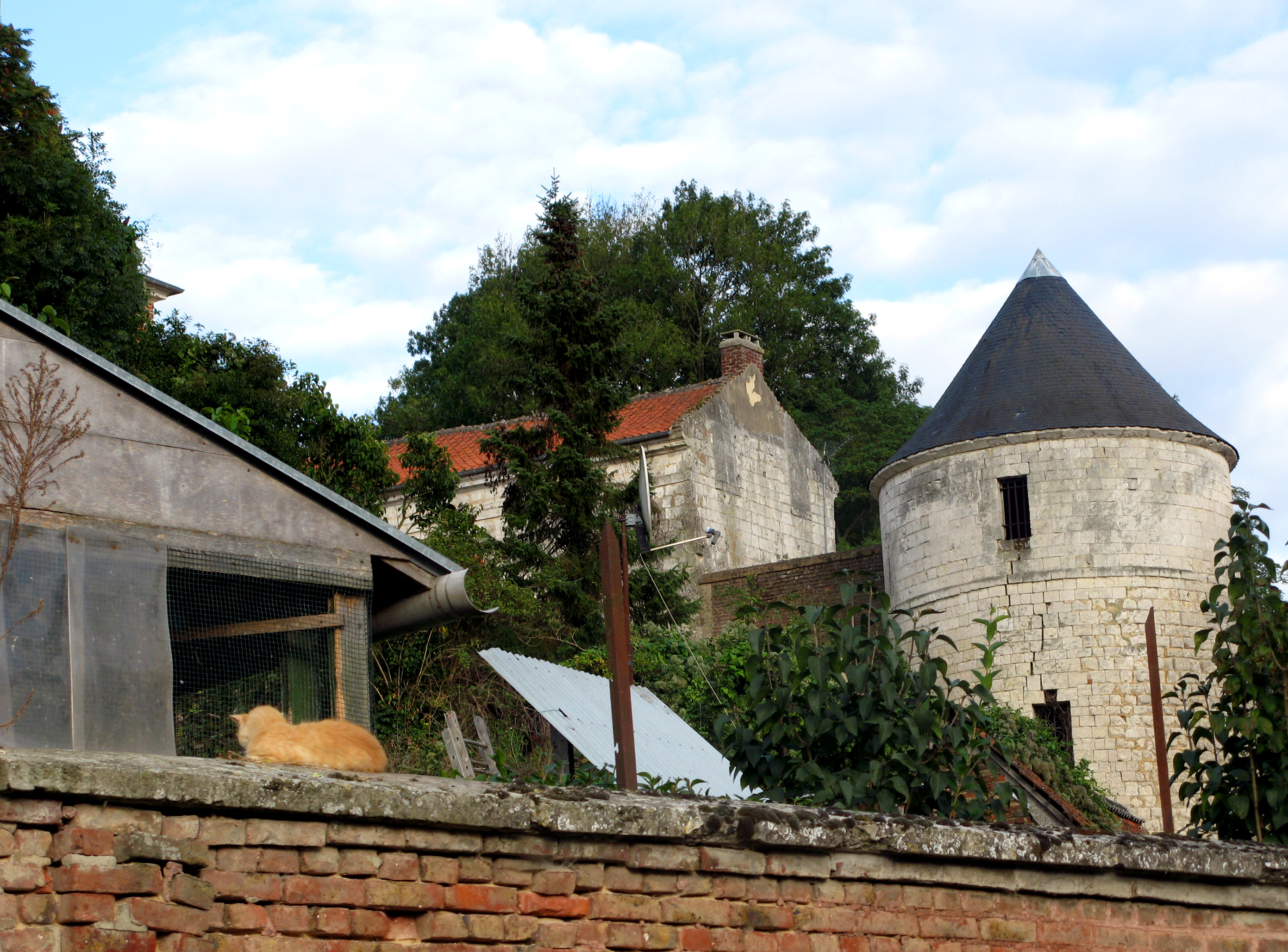
The round tower

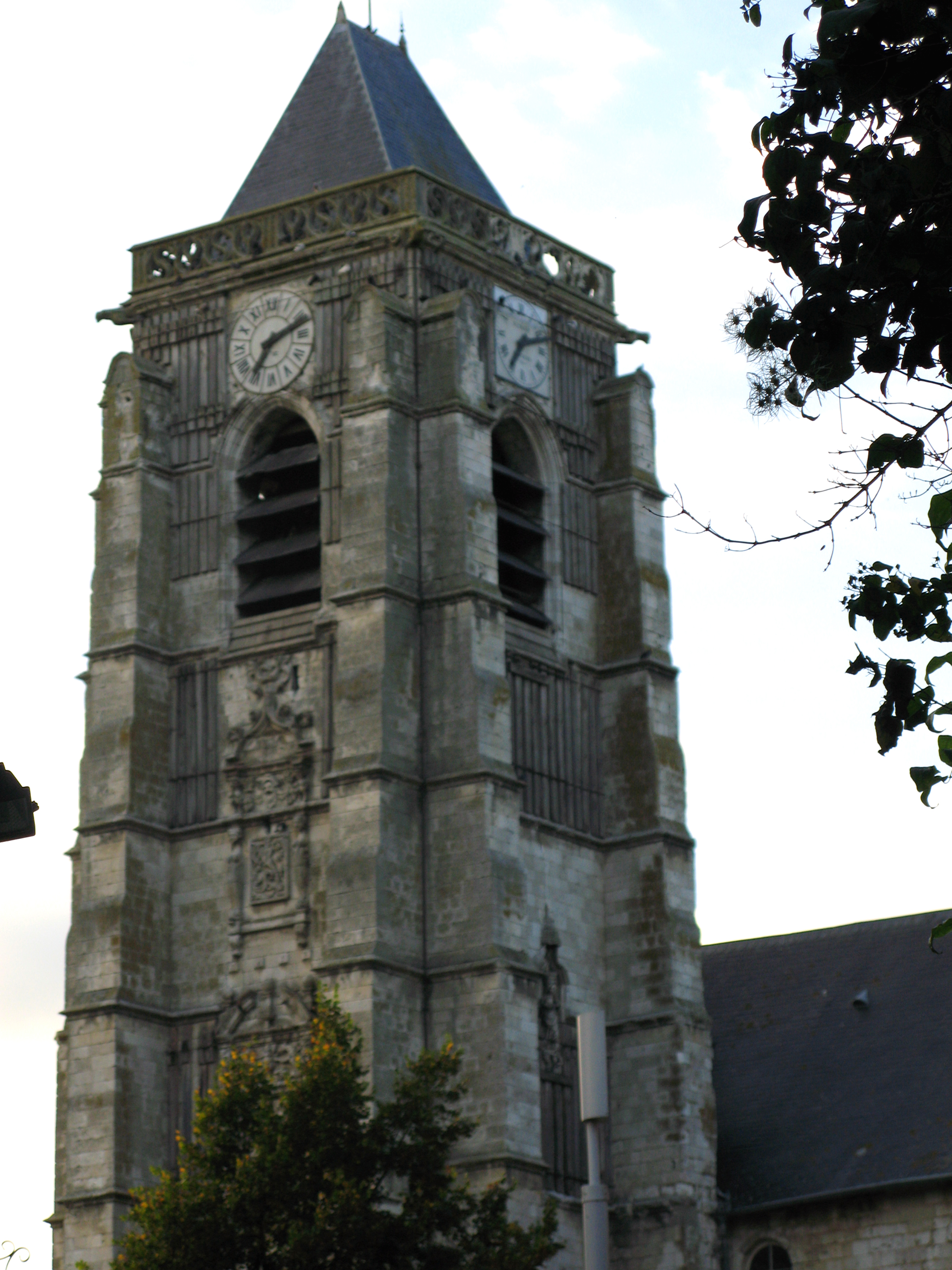
The church tower

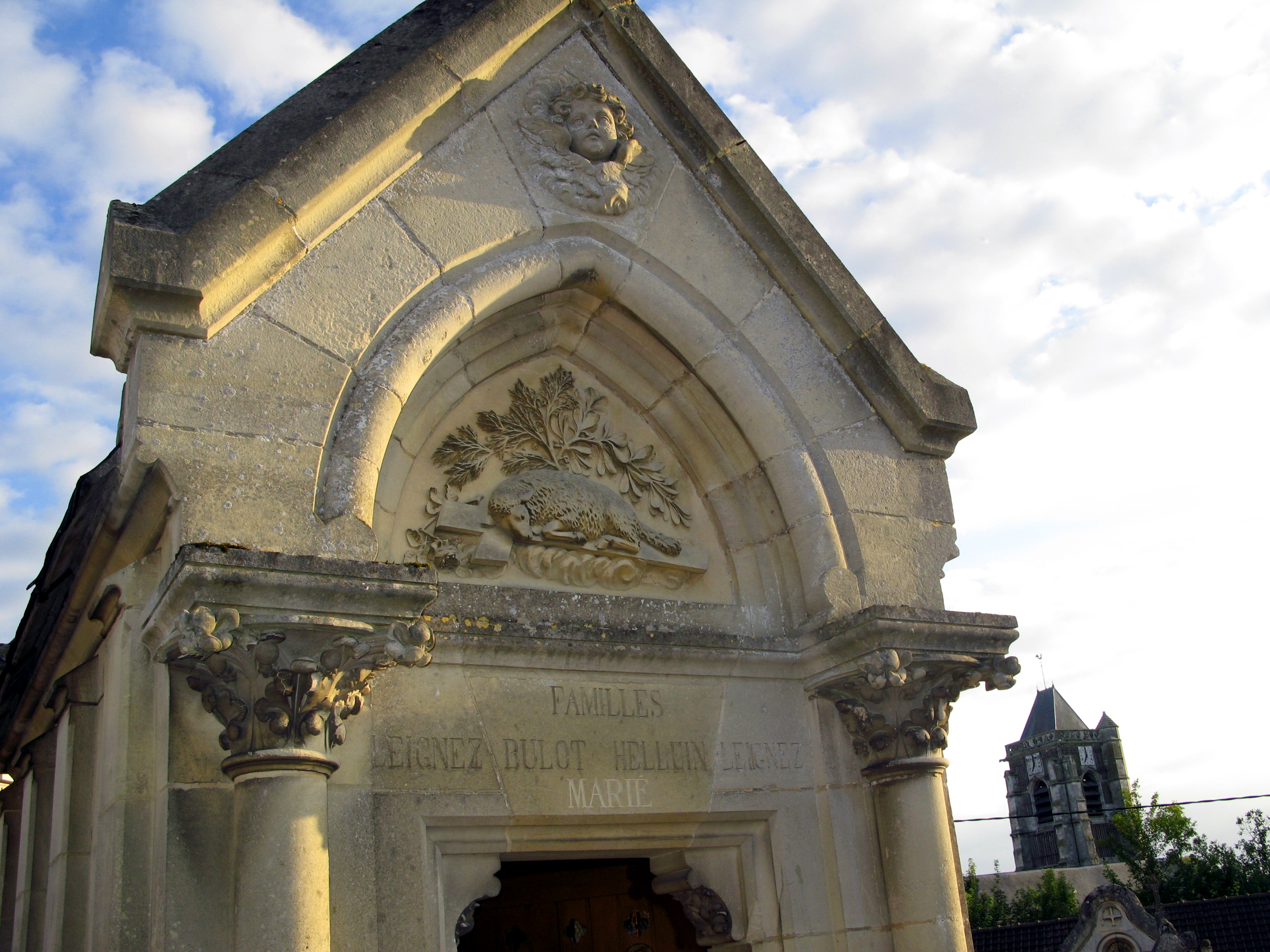
The cemetery gate
- Aerial views
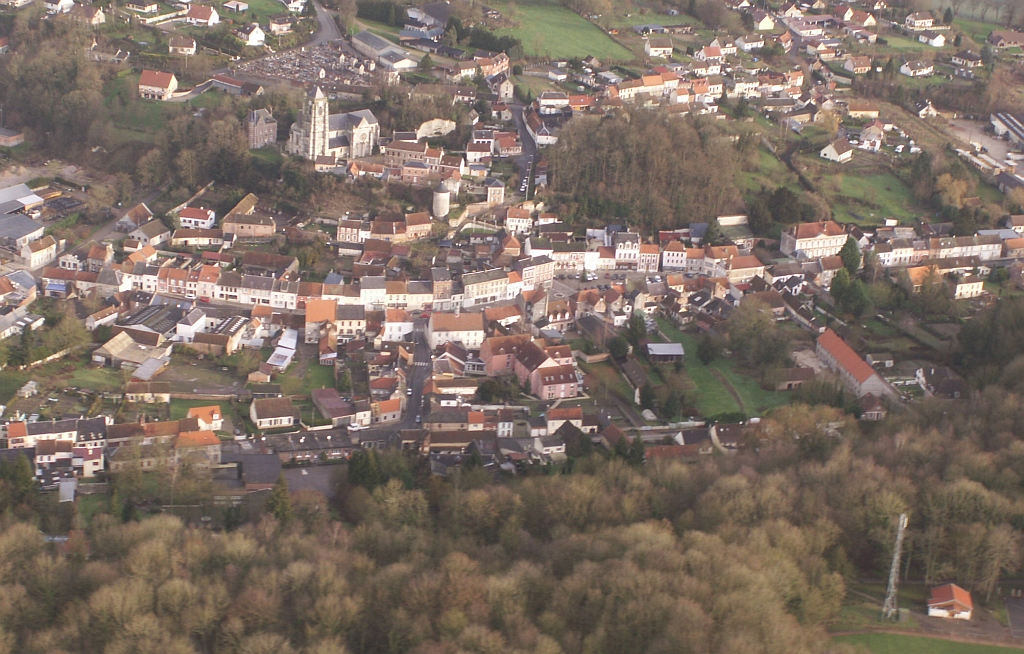

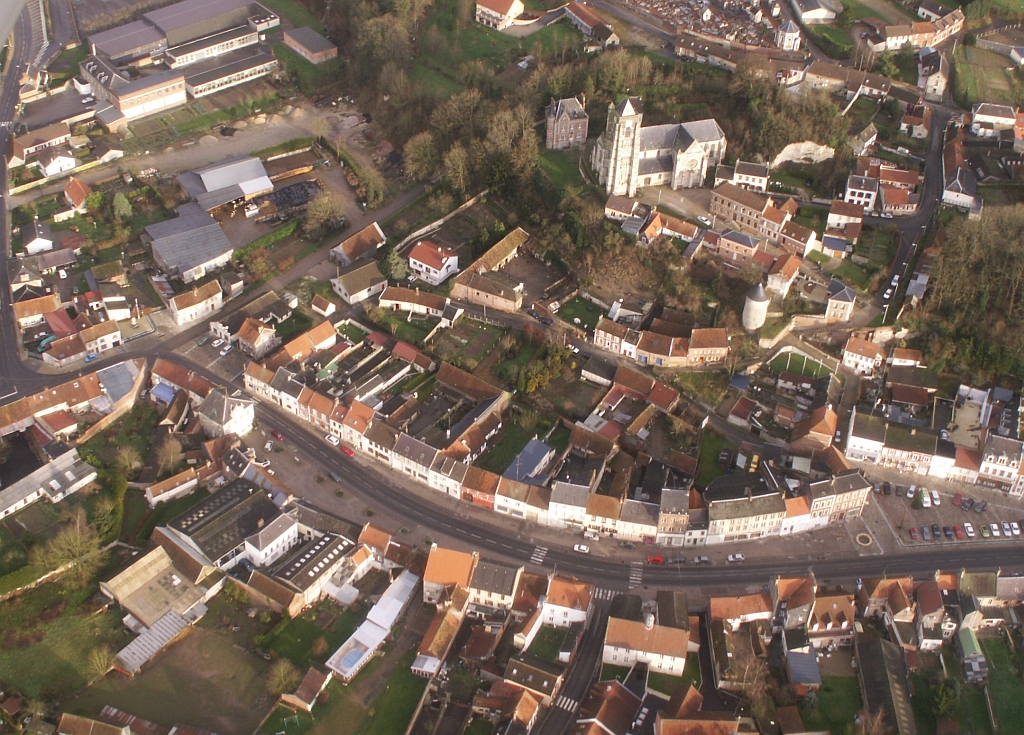

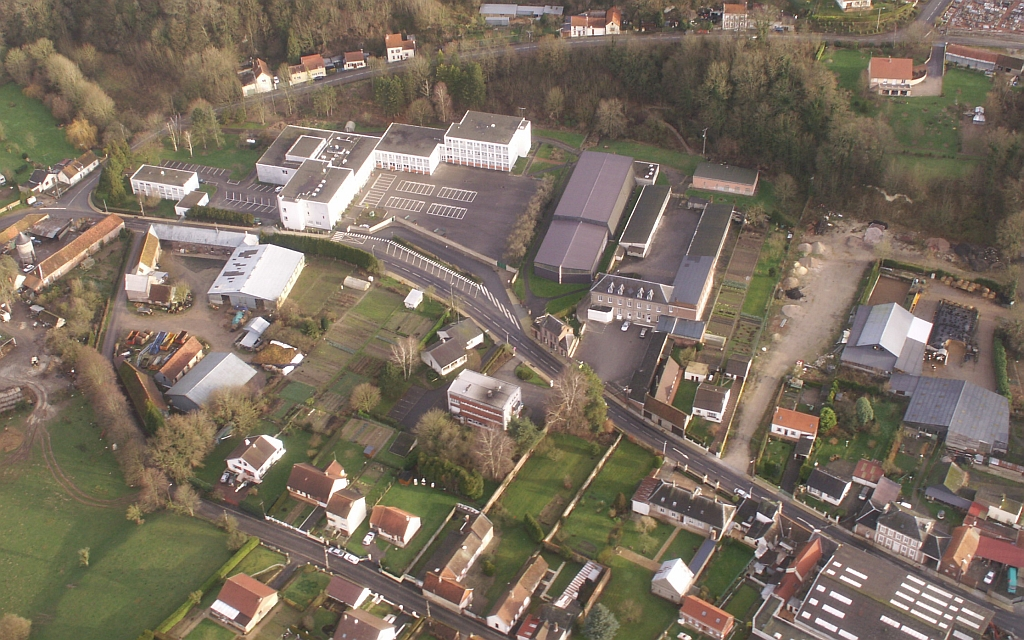

== See also ==
- Communes of the Somme department
