= Canton of Oisemont =

Coordinates: 49°57′22″N 1°46′2″E

Oisemont
- Former canton
- Interactive map of Oisemont
- Country: France
- Region: Hauts-de-France
- Department: Somme
- No. of communes: {{{nbcomm}}}
- Disbanded: 2015
- Area: 143.83 km^{2} (55.53 sq mi)
- Population (2012): 6,183
  - Density: 42.99/km^{2} (111.3/sq mi)

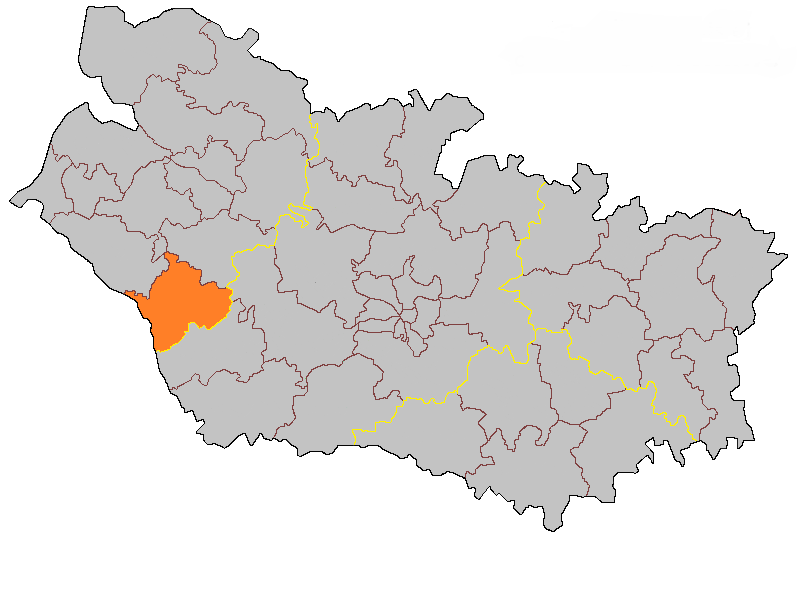

The Canton of Oisemont is a former canton in the department of the Somme and in the Picardy region of northern France. It was disbanded following the French canton reorganisation in March 2015. It consisted of 31 communes, which joined the canton of Poix-de-Picardie in 2015. It had 6,183 inhabitants (2012).

== Geography ==
The canton is organised around the commune of Oisemont in the arrondissement of Abbeville (arrondissement of Amiens before 2009). The altitude varies from 48m at Heucourt-Croquoison to 204m at Neuville-Coppegueule for an average of 118m. The canton's economy is almost entirely agricultural, only the chef-lieu having a population in excess of 1000.

The canton comprised 31 communes:

- Andainville
- Aumâtre
- Avesnes-Chaussoy
- Bermesnil
- Cannessières
- Épaumesnil
- Étréjust
- Fontaine-le-Sec
- Forceville-en-Vimeu
- Foucaucourt-Hors-Nesle
- Fresnes-Tilloloy
- Fresneville
- Fresnoy-Andainville
- Frettecuisse
- Heucourt-Croquoison
- Inval-Boiron
- Lignières-en-Vimeu
- Le Mazis
- Mouflières
- Nesle-l'Hôpital
- Neslette
- Neuville-au-Bois
- Neuville-Coppegueule
- Oisemont
- Saint-Aubin-Rivière
- Saint-Léger-sur-Bresle
- Saint-Maulvis
- Senarpont
- Vergies
- Villeroy
- Woirel

== Population ==
1962	1968	1975	1982	1990	1999
5753	6347	6340	6232	6172	5957
Census count starting from 1962 : Population without double counting

== See also ==
- Arrondissements of the Somme department
- Cantons of the Somme department
- Communes of the Somme department
