= Amiens 8th (Nord) Canton =

Coordinates: 49°53′32″N 2°17′55″E

Amiens-8
- Former canton
- Interactive map of Amiens-8
- Country: France
- Region: Hauts-de-France
- Department: Somme
- No. of communes: {{{nbcomm}}}
- Disbanded: 2015
- Population (2012): 16,103

The Amiens 8th (Nord) Canton is a former canton situated in the department of the Somme and in the Picardy region of northern France. It was disbanded following the French canton reorganisation which came into effect in March 2015. It had 16,103 inhabitants (2012).

== Geography ==
The canton was organised around the commune of Amiens in the arrondissement of Amiens. The altitude varies from 14m at Amiens, to 131m at Poulainville for an average of 44m.

The canton comprised 3 communes:

- Allonville
- Amiens (partly)
- Poulainville

== See also ==
- Arrondissements of the Somme department
- Cantons of the Somme department
- Communes of the Somme department
