= Canton of Amiens-1 =

Coordinates: 49°54′N 2°17′E

Amiens-1
- Canton
- Interactive map of Amiens-1
- Country: France
- Region: Hauts-de-France
- Department: Somme
- No. of communes: {{{nbcomm}}}
- Population (2023): 26,286
- INSEE code: 80 06

The Canton of Amiens-1 is a canton situated in the department of the Somme and in the Hauts-de-France region of northern France.

== Geography ==
The canton covers the northwestern part of the commune of Amiens in the arrondissement of Amiens.

== See also ==
- Arrondissements of the Somme department
- Cantons of the Somme department
- Communes of the Somme department
