= Vraignes =

Vraignes may refer to two communes in the Somme department in northern France:

- Vraignes-en-Vermandois
- Vraignes-lès-Hornoy
