= Foucaucourt =

Foucaucourt may refer to the following municipalities in France :

- Foucaucourt-en-Santerre, in the Somme department
- Foucaucourt-Hors-Nesle, in the Somme department
- Foucaucourt-sur-Thabas, in the Meuse department

== Aerodromes ==
- Foucaucourt Aerodrome, a temporary World War I airfield near Foucaucourt-en-Santerre in the Somme department
- Foucaucourt Aerodrome, a temporary World War I airfield near Foucaucourt-sur-Thabas in the Meuse department
