= Fourdrinoy =

- Commune
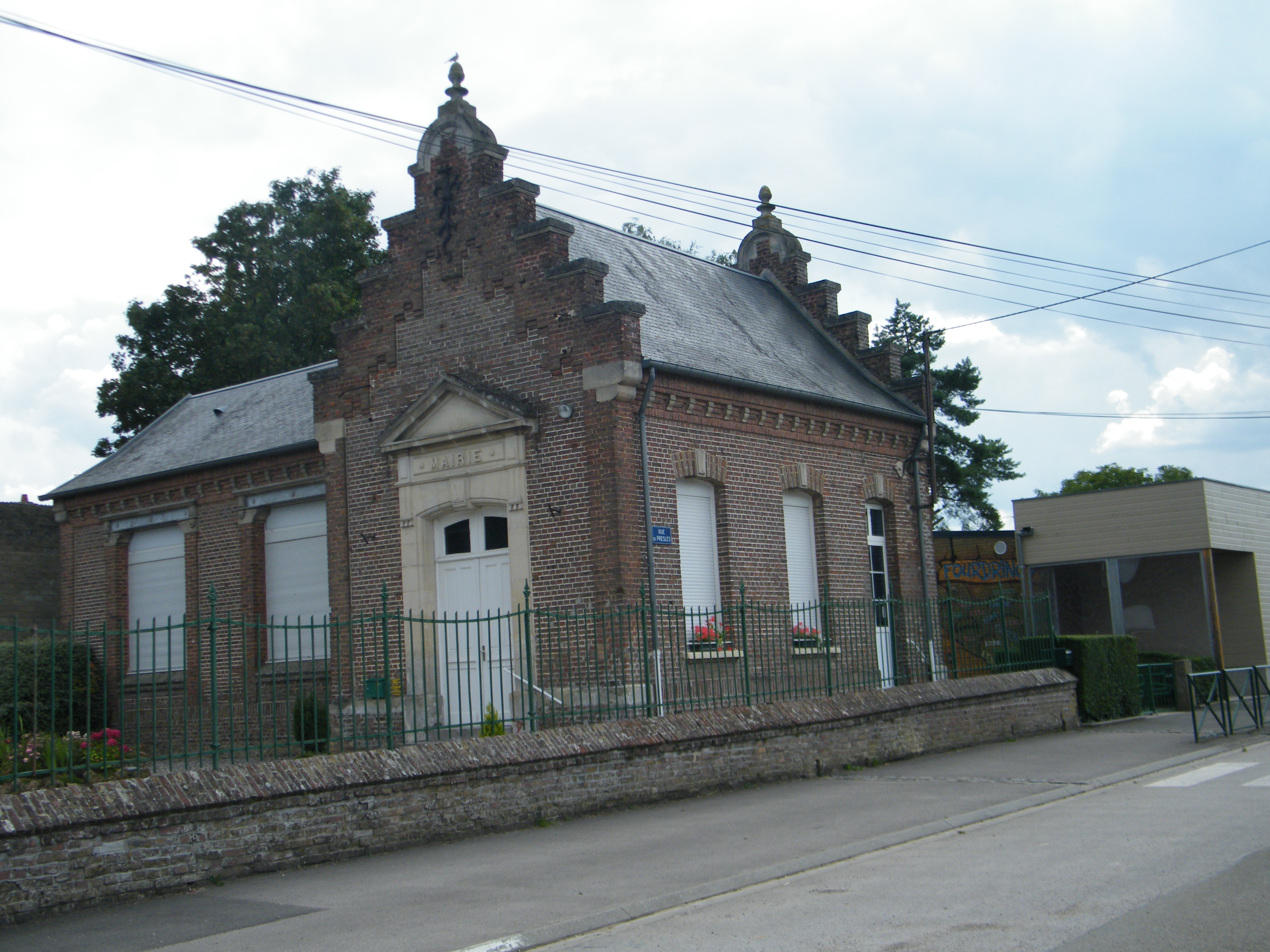
- The town hall in Fourdrinoy
- Location of Fourdrinoy
- Location within France Location within Hauts-de-France
- Coordinates: 49°55′06″N 2°06′26″E
- Country: France
- Region: Hauts-de-France
- Department: Somme
- Arrondissement: Amiens
- Canton: Ailly-sur-Somme
- Intercommunality: CC Nièvre et Somme

Government
  - Mayor (2020–2026): Manuel Guillot
- Area^{1}: 9.12 km^{2} (3.52 sq mi)
- Elevation: 106 m (348 ft)
- Highest elevation: 120 m (390 ft)
- Lowest elevation: 42 m (138 ft)
- Population (2023): 380
  - Density: 42/km^{2} (110/sq mi)
- Time zone: UTC+01:00 (CET)
  - Summer (DST): UTC+02:00 (CEST)
- INSEE/Postal code: 80341 /80310
- ^{1} French Land Register data, which excludes lakes, ponds, glaciers > 1 km^{2} (0.386 sq mi or 247 acres) and river estuaries.

Fourdrinoy (French pronunciation: [fuʁdʁinwa]; Picard: Fordinoé) is a commune in the Somme department in Hauts-de-France in northern France.

== Geography ==
Fourdrinoy is situated 6 miles (10 km) northwest of Amiens on the D121 road

== Population ==
Historical population
Year	Pop.	±% p.a.
1968	268	—
1975	276	+0.42%
1982	340	+3.02%
1990	334	−0.22%
1999	326	−0.27%
2007	347	+0.78%
2012	368	+1.18%
2017	417	+2.53%
2023	380	−1.54%
Source: INSEE

== See also ==
- Communes of the Somme department
