= Guizancourt =

Guizancourt Dizincourt (Picard)
- Commune
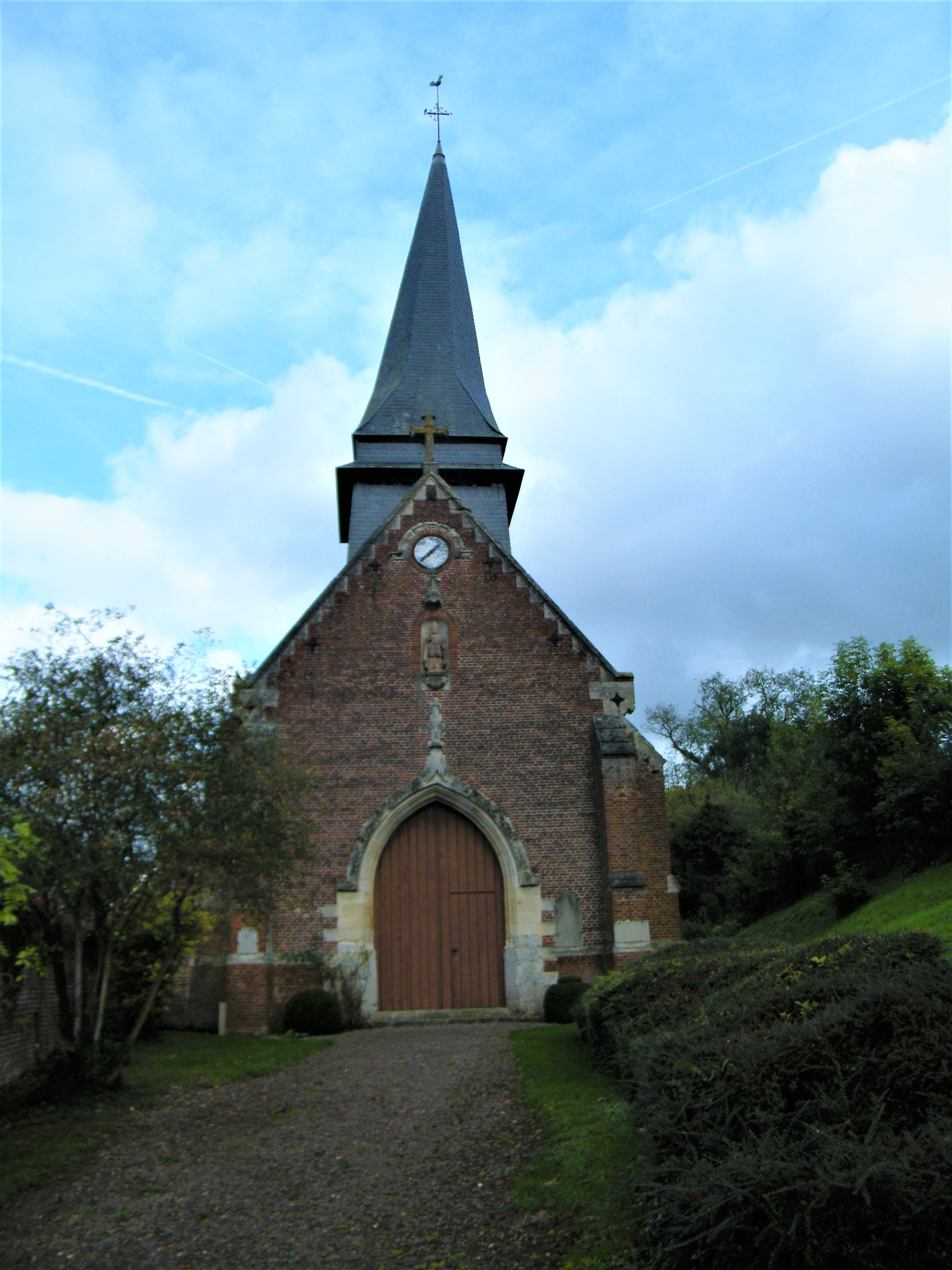
- The church in Guizancourt

- Coat of arms
- Location of Guizancourt
- Location within France Location within Hauts-de-France
- Coordinates: 49°44′12″N 1°59′44″E
- Country: France
- Region: Hauts-de-France
- Department: Somme
- Arrondissement: Amiens
- Canton: Poix-de-Picardie
- Intercommunality: CC Somme Sud-Ouest

Government
  - Mayor (2020–2026): Dany Vasseur
- Area^{1}: 5.94 km^{2} (2.29 sq mi)
- Elevation: 85 m (279 ft)
- Highest elevation: 184 m (604 ft)
- Lowest elevation: 90 m (300 ft)
- Population (2023): 113
  - Density: 19.0/km^{2} (49.3/sq mi)
- Time zone: UTC+01:00 (CET)
  - Summer (DST): UTC+02:00 (CEST)
- INSEE/Postal code: 80402 /80290
- ^{1} French Land Register data, which excludes lakes, ponds, glaciers > 1 km^{2} (0.386 sq mi or 247 acres) and river estuaries.

Guizancourt (French pronunciation: [ɡizɑ̃kuʁ]; Picard: Dizincourt ) is a commune in the Somme department in Hauts-de-France in northern France.

== Geography ==
Guizancourt is situated on the D94 road, some 15 miles (24 km) southwest of Amiens.

== Population ==
Historical population
Year	Pop.	±% p.a.
1968	94	—
1975	82	−1.93%
1982	89	+1.18%
1990	97	+1.08%
1999	105	+0.88%
2007	130	+2.71%
2012	117	−2.09%
2017	127	+1.65%
2023	113	−1.93%
Source: INSEE

== See also ==
- Communes of the Somme department
