= Beaucamps-le-Vieux =

- Commune
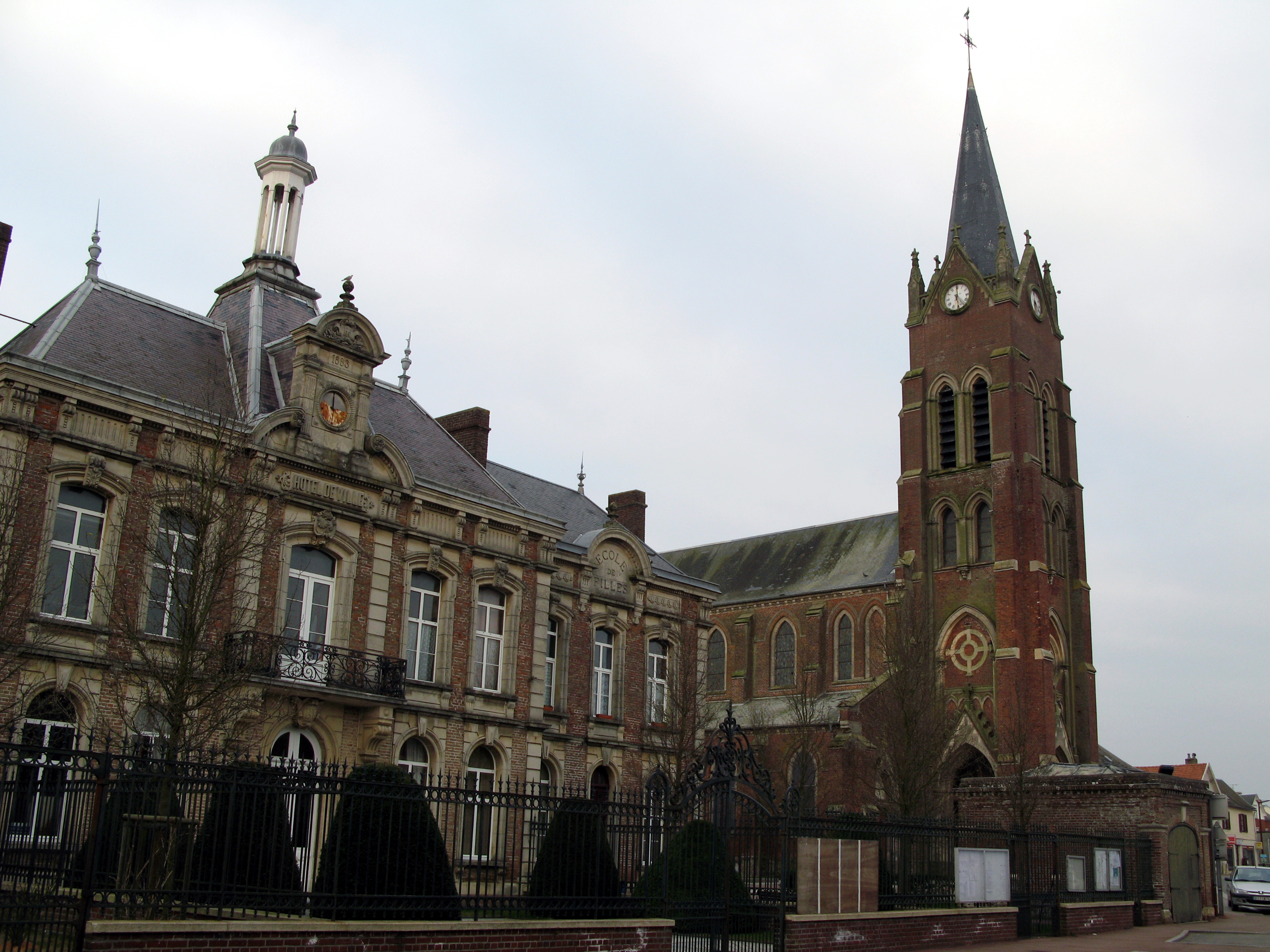
- The town hall and church of Beaucamps-le-Vieux

- Coat of arms
- Location of Beaucamps-le-Vieux
- Location within France Location within Hauts-de-France
- Coordinates: 49°50′42″N 1°46′48″E
- Country: France
- Region: Hauts-de-France
- Department: Somme
- Arrondissement: Amiens
- Canton: Poix-de-Picardie
- Intercommunality: CC Somme Sud-Ouest

Government
  - Mayor (2020–2026): François Thiverny
- Area^{1}: 5.02 km^{2} (1.94 sq mi)
- Elevation: 189 m (620 ft)
- Highest elevation: 201 m (659 ft)
- Lowest elevation: 127 m (417 ft)
- Population (2023): 1,396
  - Density: 278/km^{2} (720/sq mi)
- Time zone: UTC+01:00 (CET)
  - Summer (DST): UTC+02:00 (CEST)
- INSEE/Postal code: 80062 /80430
- ^{1} French Land Register data, which excludes lakes, ponds, glaciers > 1 km^{2} (0.386 sq mi or 247 acres) and river estuaries.

Beaucamps-le-Vieux (French pronunciation: [bokɑ̃ lə vjø]; Picard: Bieucamp) is a commune in the Somme department in Hauts-de-France in northern France.

== Geography ==
The commune is situated at the junction of the D96, D496 and D211 roads, 3 kilometres (2 mi) from the banks of the Bresle, the border of the departments of the Somme and Seine-Maritime.

== Population ==
Historical population
Year	Pop.	±% p.a.
1968	1,449	—
1975	1,457	+0.08%
1982	1,443	−0.14%
1990	1,404	−0.34%
1999	1,385	−0.15%
2007	1,443	+0.51%
2012	1,417	−0.36%
2017	1,421	+0.06%
2023	1,396	−0.30%
Source: INSEE

== History ==
In 1891, Beaucamps-le-Vieux became the provisional terminal of the Somme regional railway, coming from Amiens, then later reaching Aumale in 1901 and eventually Envermeu in 1906. The line closed to passengers in 1940, and to all traffic in 1947. The train station still stands, but is in private ownership.

== See also ==
- Communes of the Somme department
