= Saint-Léger-sur-Bresle =

- Commune
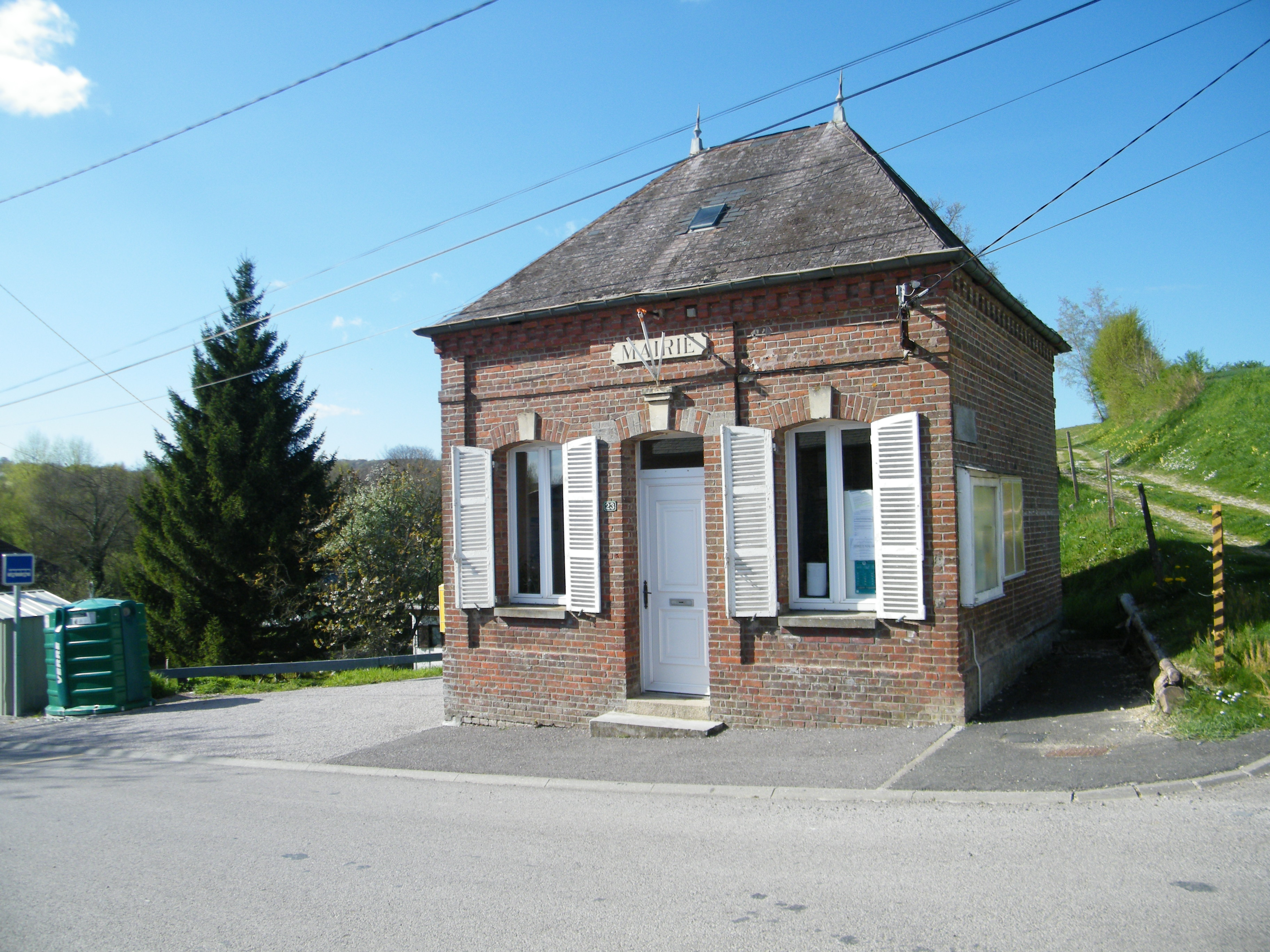
- The town hall in Saint-Léger-sur-Bresle
- Location of Saint-Léger-sur-Bresle
- Location within France Location within Hauts-de-France
- Coordinates: 49°52′10″N 1°43′14″E
- Country: France
- Region: Hauts-de-France
- Department: Somme
- Arrondissement: Amiens
- Canton: Poix-de-Picardie
- Intercommunality: CC Somme Sud-Ouest

Government
  - Mayor (2020–2026): Jean-Claude Houas
- Area^{1}: 1.09 km^{2} (0.42 sq mi)
- Elevation: 71 m (233 ft)
- Highest elevation: 179 m (587 ft)
- Lowest elevation: 71 m (233 ft)
- Population (2023): 80
  - Density: 73/km^{2} (190/sq mi)
- Time zone: UTC+01:00 (CET)
  - Summer (DST): UTC+02:00 (CEST)
- INSEE/Postal code: 80707 /80140
- ^{1} French Land Register data, which excludes lakes, ponds, glaciers > 1 km^{2} (0.386 sq mi or 247 acres) and river estuaries.

Saint-Léger-sur-Bresle (French pronunciation: [sɛ̃ leʒe syʁ bʁɛl], literally Saint-Léger on Bresle; Picard: Saint-Lgé-su-Brèle) is a commune in the Somme department in Hauts-de-France in northern France.

== Geography ==
The commune is situated 23 kilometres (14 mi) south of Abbeville, on the D246 road and by the banks of the river Bresle, the border with Seine-Maritime.

== Population ==
Historical population
Year	Pop.	±% p.a.
1968	46	—
1975	52	+1.77%
1982	34	−5.89%
1990	51	+5.20%
1999	57	+1.24%
2007	78	+4.00%
2012	87	+2.21%
2017	81	−1.42%
2023	80	−0.21%
Source: INSEE

== See also ==
- Communes of the Somme department
