= Marlers =

- Commune
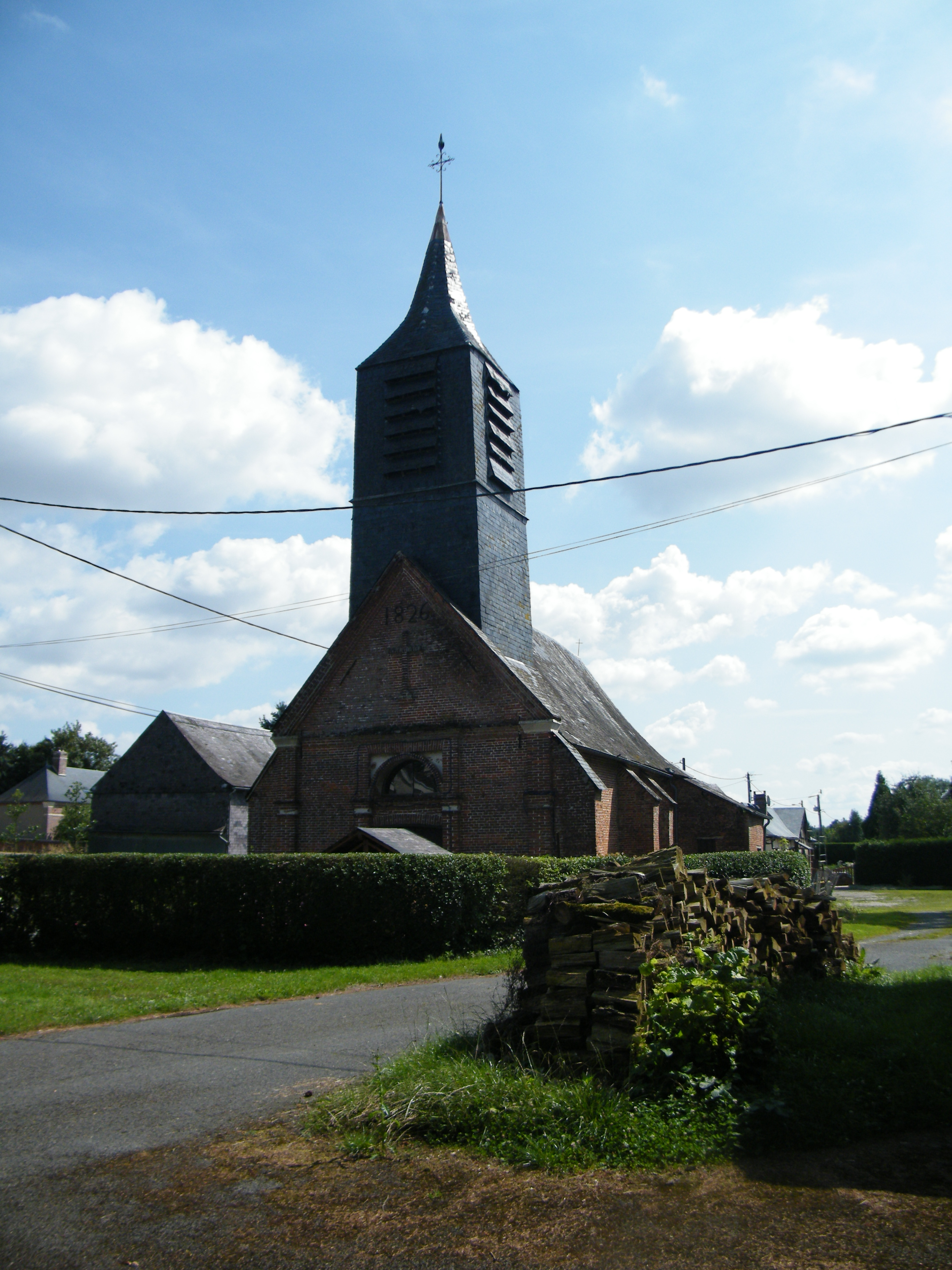
- The church in Marlers
- Location of Marlers
- Location within France Location within Hauts-de-France
- Coordinates: 49°45′44″N 1°50′59″E
- Country: France
- Region: Hauts-de-France
- Department: Somme
- Arrondissement: Amiens
- Canton: Poix-de-Picardie
- Intercommunality: CC Somme Sud-Ouest

Government
  - Mayor (2020–2026): Robert Noppe
- Area^{1}: 3.93 km^{2} (1.52 sq mi)
- Elevation: 203 m (666 ft)
- Highest elevation: 210 m (690 ft)
- Lowest elevation: 167 m (548 ft)
- Population (2023): 149
  - Density: 37.9/km^{2} (98.2/sq mi)
- Time zone: UTC+01:00 (CET)
  - Summer (DST): UTC+02:00 (CEST)
- INSEE/Postal code: 80515 /80290
- ^{1} French Land Register data, which excludes lakes, ponds, glaciers > 1 km^{2} (0.386 sq mi or 247 acres) and river estuaries.

Marlers is a commune in the Somme department in Hauts-de-France in northern France.

== Geography ==
Marlers is situated on the D98 road, some 25 miles (40 km) southwest of Amiens.

== History ==
The commune was called Marles on the 19th century Cassini map.

== Population ==
Historical population
| Year | Pop. | ±% p.a. |
|---|---|---|
| 1968 | 155 | — |
| 1975 | 159 | +0.36% |
| 1982 | 152 | −0.64% |
| 1990 | 120 | −2.91% |
| 1999 | 147 | +2.28% |
| 2007 | 168 | +1.68% |
| 2012 | 144 | −3.04% |
| 2017 | 141 | −0.42% |
| 2023 | 149 | +0.92% |
Source: INSEE

== Places of interest ==
- The war memorial

== See also ==
- Communes of the Somme department
