= Vergies =

- Commune
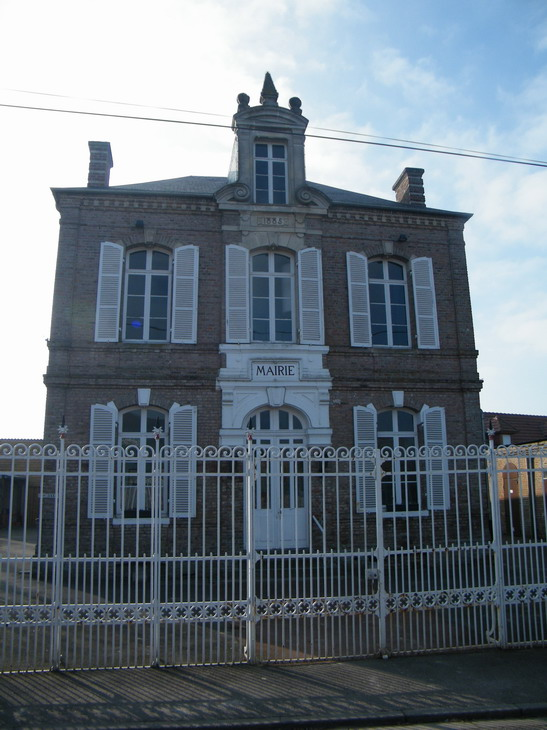
- The town hall in Vergies
- Location of Vergies
- Location within France Location within Hauts-de-France
- Coordinates: 49°56′03″N 1°50′53″E
- Country: France
- Region: Hauts-de-France
- Department: Somme
- Arrondissement: Amiens
- Canton: Poix-de-Picardie
- Intercommunality: CC Somme Sud-Ouest

Government
  - Mayor (2020–2026): Xavier Lenglet
- Area^{1}: 8 km^{2} (3.1 sq mi)
- Elevation: 128 m (420 ft)
- Highest elevation: 129 m (423 ft)
- Lowest elevation: 58 m (190 ft)
- Population (2023): 174
  - Density: 22/km^{2} (56/sq mi)
- Time zone: UTC+01:00 (CET)
  - Summer (DST): UTC+02:00 (CEST)
- INSEE/Postal code: 80788 /80270
- ^{1} French Land Register data, which excludes lakes, ponds, glaciers > 1 km^{2} (0.386 sq mi or 247 acres) and river estuaries.

Vergies (French pronunciation: [vɛʁʒi]) is a commune in the Somme department in Hauts-de-France in northern France.

== Geography ==
Vergies is situated 17 miles (27 km) west of Amiens, on the D298 road

== Population ==
Historical population
Year	Pop.	±% p.a.
1968	203	—
1975	199	−0.28%
1982	192	−0.51%
1990	153	−2.80%
1999	151	−0.15%
2007	191	+2.98%
2012	183	−0.85%
2017	163	−2.29%
2023	174	+1.09%
Source: INSEE

== See also ==
- Communes of the Somme department
