= Fontaine-le-Sec =

- Commune
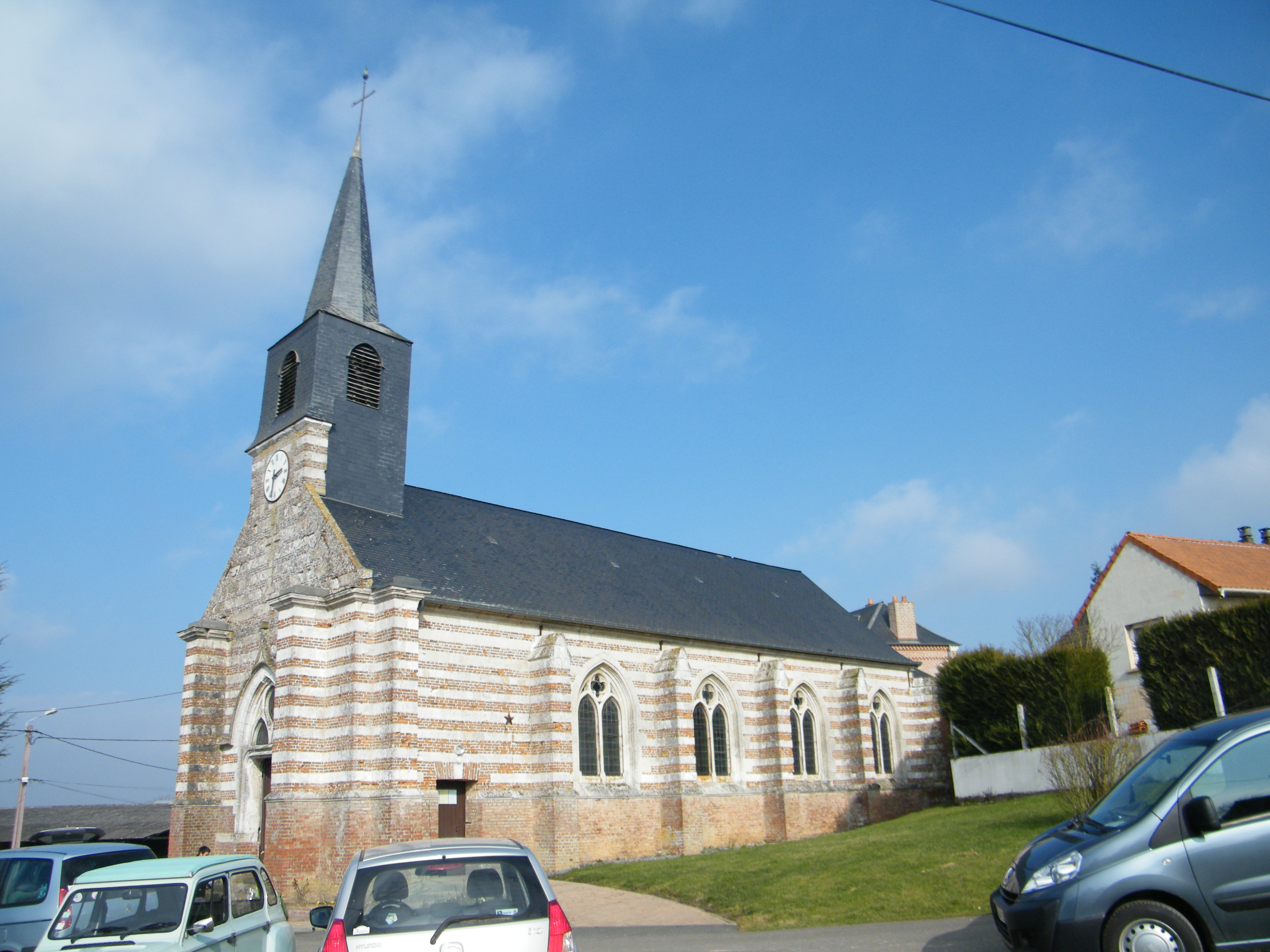
- The church in Fontaine-le-Sec
- Location of Fontaine-le-Sec
- Location within France Location within Hauts-de-France
- Coordinates: 49°56′41″N 1°48′34″E
- Country: France
- Region: Hauts-de-France
- Department: Somme
- Arrondissement: Amiens
- Canton: Poix-de-Picardie
- Intercommunality: CC Somme Sud-Ouest

Government
  - Mayor (2020–2026): Guy Dufour
- Area^{1}: 7.44 km^{2} (2.87 sq mi)
- Elevation: 100 m (330 ft)
- Highest elevation: 129 m (423 ft)
- Lowest elevation: 65 m (213 ft)
- Population (2023): 143
  - Density: 19.2/km^{2} (49.8/sq mi)
- Time zone: UTC+01:00 (CET)
  - Summer (DST): UTC+02:00 (CEST)
- INSEE/Postal code: 80324 /80140
- ^{1} French Land Register data, which excludes lakes, ponds, glaciers > 1 km^{2} (0.386 sq mi or 247 acres) and river estuaries.

Fontaine-le-Sec (French pronunciation: [fɔ̃tɛn lə sɛk]; Picard: Fontainne-Sèque) is a commune in the Somme department in Hauts-de-France in northern France.

== Geography ==
The commune is situated just off the D29 road, some 13 miles (21 km) south of Abbeville.

== Population ==
Historical population
Year	Pop.	±% p.a.
1968	191	—
1975	180	−0.84%
1982	171	−0.73%
1990	149	−1.71%
1999	151	+0.15%
2007	126	−2.24%
2012	148	+3.27%
2017	154	+0.80%
2023	143	−1.23%
Source: INSEE

== See also ==
- Communes of the Somme department
