= Inval-Boiron =

- Commune
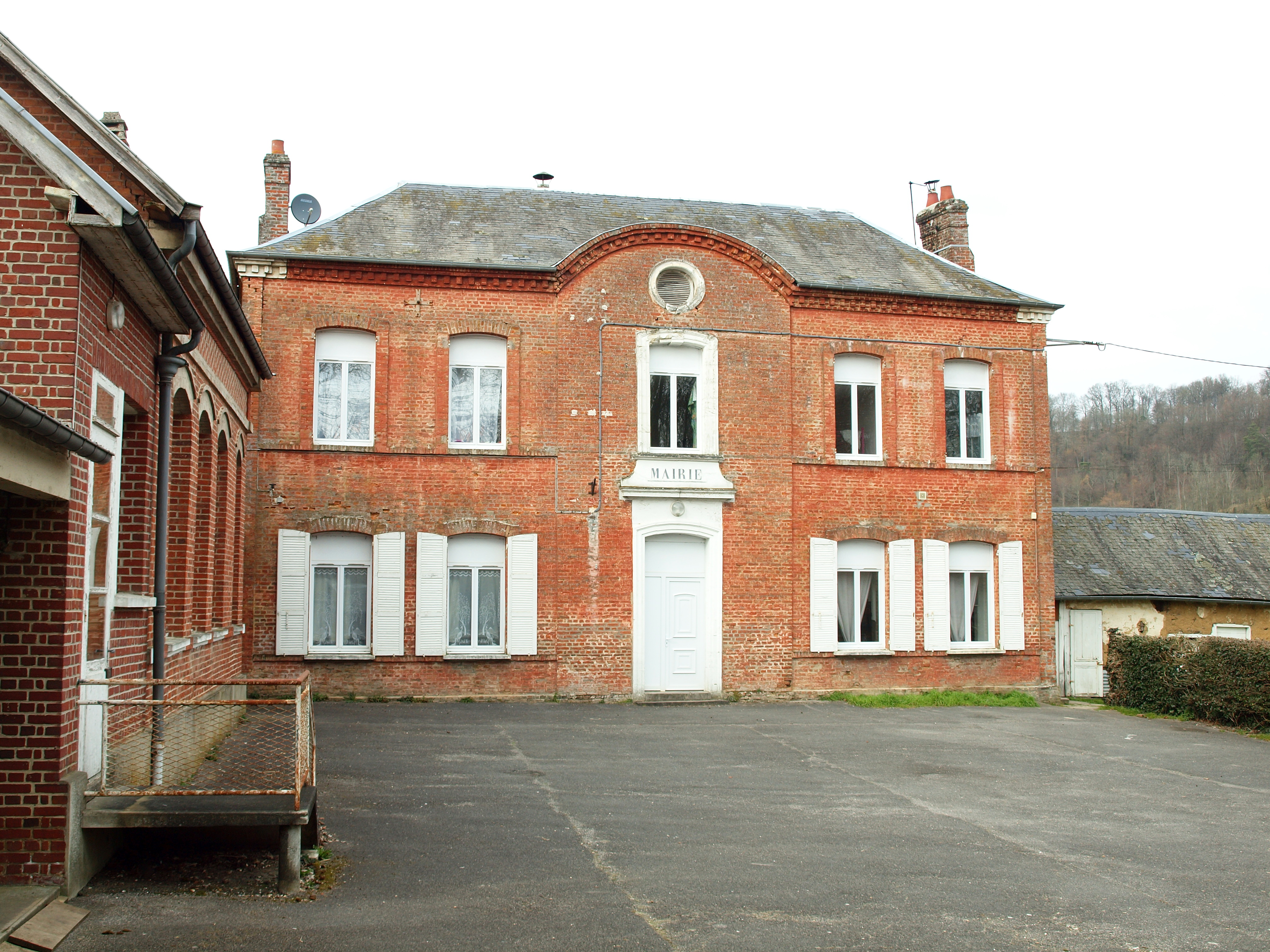
- The town hall in Inval-Boiron
- Location of Inval-Boiron
- Location within France Location within Hauts-de-France
- Coordinates: 49°53′04″N 1°44′54″E
- Country: France
- Region: Hauts-de-France
- Department: Somme
- Arrondissement: Amiens
- Canton: Poix-de-Picardie
- Intercommunality: CC Somme Sud-Ouest

Government
  - Mayor (2020–2026): Marcel Genty
- Area^{1}: 3.32 km^{2} (1.28 sq mi)
- Elevation: 100 m (330 ft)
- Highest elevation: 176 m (577 ft)
- Lowest elevation: 75 m (246 ft)
- Population (2023): 118
  - Density: 35.5/km^{2} (92.1/sq mi)
- Time zone: UTC+01:00 (CET)
  - Summer (DST): UTC+02:00 (CEST)
- INSEE/Postal code: 80450 /80430
- ^{1} French Land Register data, which excludes lakes, ponds, glaciers > 1 km^{2} (0.386 sq mi or 247 acres) and river estuaries.

Inval-Boiron (French pronunciation: [ɛ̃val bwaʁɔ̃]) is a commune in the Somme department in Hauts-de-France in northern France.

== Geography ==
The commune is situated on the D211 road, some 20 miles (32 km) south of Abbeville.

== Population ==
Historical population
Year	Pop.	±% p.a.
1968	108	—
1975	94	−1.96%
1982	94	+0.00%
1990	83	−1.54%
1999	90	+0.90%
2007	78	−1.77%
2012	101	+5.30%
2017	113	+2.27%
2023	118	+0.72%
Source: INSEE

== See also ==
- Communes of the Somme department
