= Lignières-en-Vimeu =

- Commune
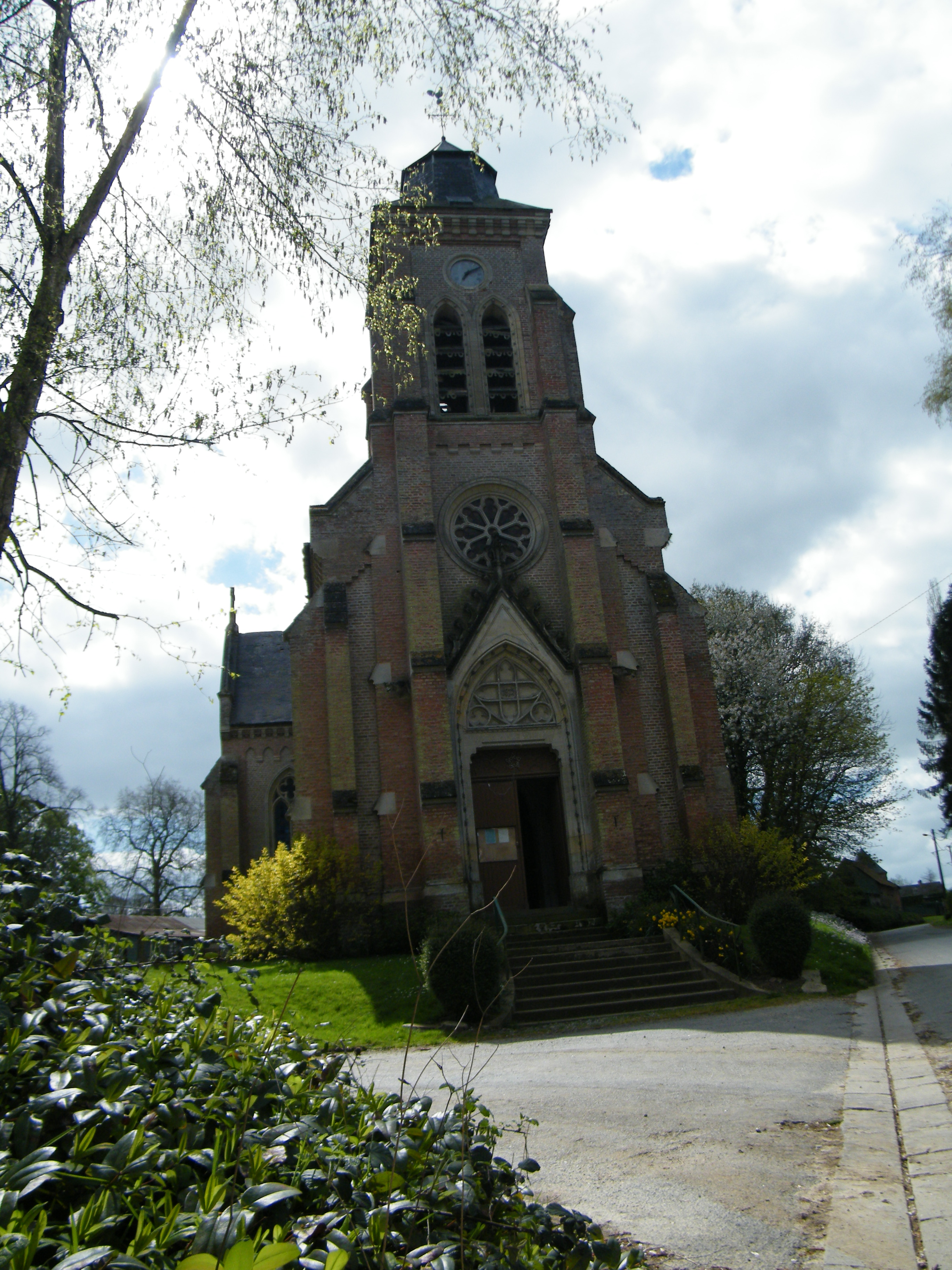
- The church in Lignières-en-Vimeu
- Location of Lignières-en-Vimeu
- Location within France Location within Hauts-de-France
- Coordinates: 49°54′38″N 1°44′18″E
- Country: France
- Region: Hauts-de-France
- Department: Somme
- Arrondissement: Amiens
- Canton: Poix-de-Picardie
- Intercommunality: Somme Sud-Ouest

Government
  - Mayor (2020–2026): Isabelle de Waziers
- Area^{1}: 3.29 km^{2} (1.27 sq mi)
- Elevation: 150 m (490 ft)
- Highest elevation: 171 m (561 ft)
- Lowest elevation: 143 m (469 ft)
- Population (2023): 108
  - Density: 32.8/km^{2} (85.0/sq mi)
- Time zone: UTC+01:00 (CET)
  - Summer (DST): UTC+02:00 (CEST)
- INSEE/Postal code: 80480 /80140
- ^{1} French Land Register data, which excludes lakes, ponds, glaciers > 1 km^{2} (0.386 sq mi or 247 acres) and river estuaries.

Lignières-en-Vimeu (French pronunciation: [liɲjɛʁ ɑ̃ vimø]) is a commune in the Somme department in Hauts-de-France in northern France.

== Geography ==
The commune is situated on the D110 road, some 15 miles (24 km) south-southwest of Abbeville.

== Population ==
Historical population
Year	Pop.	±% p.a.
1968	110	—
1975	104	−0.80%
1982	126	+2.78%
1990	121	−0.50%
1999	107	−1.36%
2007	114	+0.80%
2012	114	+0.00%
2017	111	−0.53%
2023	108	−0.46%
Source: INSEE

== See also ==
- Communes of the Somme department
