= Poulainville =

- Commune
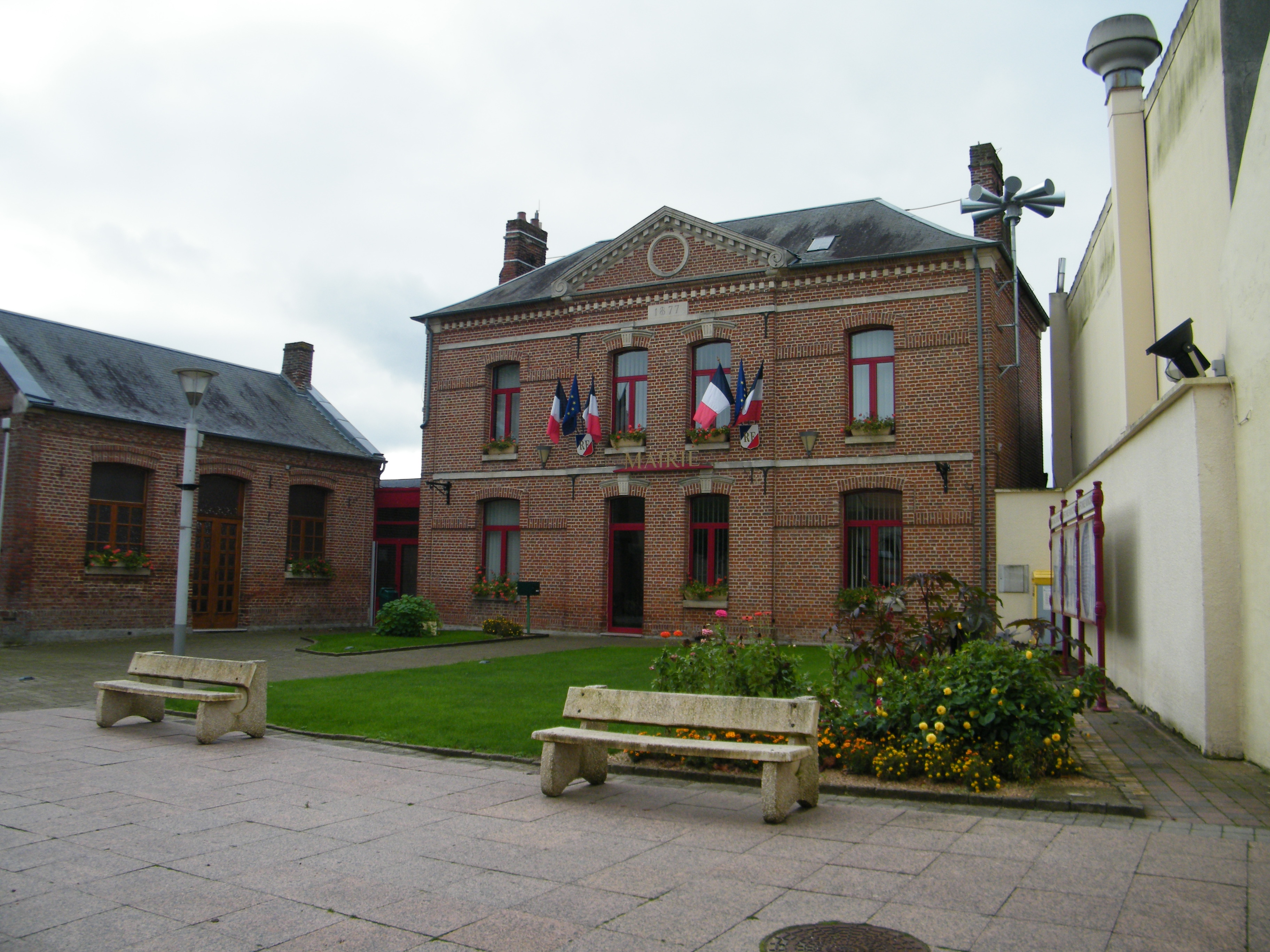
- The town hall in Poulainville
- Location of Poulainville
- Location within France Location within Hauts-de-France
- Coordinates: 49°56′52″N 2°18′54″E
- Country: France
- Region: Hauts-de-France
- Department: Somme
- Arrondissement: Amiens
- Canton: Amiens-2
- Intercommunality: Amiens Métropole

Government
  - Mayor (2020–2026): Claude Vitry
- Area^{1}: 12.6 km^{2} (4.9 sq mi)
- Elevation: 67 m (220 ft)
- Highest elevation: 131 m (430 ft)
- Lowest elevation: 33 m (108 ft)
- Population (2023): 1,335
  - Density: 106/km^{2} (274/sq mi)
- Time zone: UTC+01:00 (CET)
  - Summer (DST): UTC+02:00 (CEST)
- INSEE/Postal code: 80639 /80260
- ^{1} French Land Register data, which excludes lakes, ponds, glaciers > 1 km^{2} (0.386 sq mi or 247 acres) and river estuaries.

Poulainville (French pronunciation: [pulɛ̃vil]) is a commune in the Somme department in Hauts-de-France in northern France.

== Geography ==
Poulainville is situated on the N25 road, less than 5 km (3 mi) north of Amiens.

== Population ==
Historical population
Year	Pop.	±% p.a.
1968	504	—
1975	978	+9.93%
1982	1,254	+3.62%
1990	1,360	+1.02%
1999	1,373	+0.11%
2007	1,320	−0.49%
2012	1,245	−1.16%
2017	1,211	−0.55%
2023	1,335	+1.64%
Source: INSEE

== See also ==
- Communes of the Somme department
