= Vraignes-lès-Hornoy =

- Commune
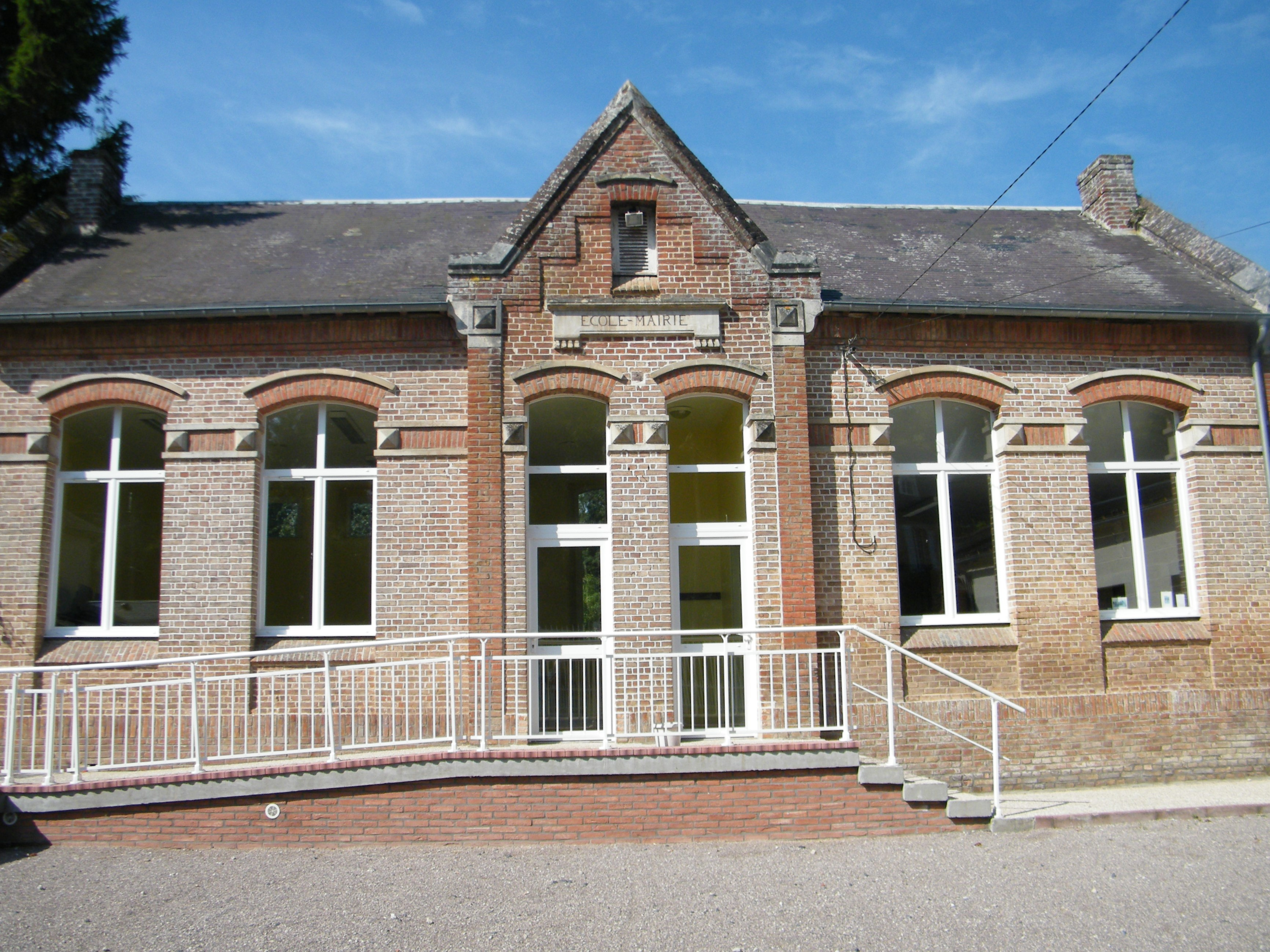
- The town hall and school in Vraignes-lès-Hornoy
- Location of Vraignes-lès-Hornoy
- Location within France Location within Hauts-de-France
- Coordinates: 49°49′42″N 1°54′40″E
- Country: France
- Region: Hauts-de-France
- Department: Somme
- Arrondissement: Amiens
- Canton: Poix-de-Picardie
- Intercommunality: Somme Sud-Ouest

Government
  - Mayor (2020–2026): Maxime Hetroy
- Area^{1}: 5.65 km^{2} (2.18 sq mi)
- Elevation: 170 m (560 ft)
- Highest elevation: 181 m (594 ft)
- Lowest elevation: 142 m (466 ft)
- Population (2023): 96
  - Density: 17/km^{2} (44/sq mi)
- Time zone: UTC+01:00 (CET)
  - Summer (DST): UTC+02:00 (CEST)
- INSEE/Postal code: 80813 /80640
- ^{1} French Land Register data, which excludes lakes, ponds, glaciers > 1 km^{2} (0.386 sq mi or 247 acres) and river estuaries.

Vraignes-lès-Hornoy is a commune in the Somme department in Hauts-de-France in northern France.

== Geography ==
The commune is situated 26 kilometres (16 mi) southwest of Amiens, on the D51a artery.

== Population ==
Historical population
Year	Pop.	±% p.a.
1968	111	—
1975	96	−2.05%
1982	92	−0.61%
1990	87	−0.70%
1999	82	−0.66%
2007	89	+1.03%
2012	88	−0.23%
2017	96	+1.76%
2023	96	+0.00%
Source: INSEE

St Valery church

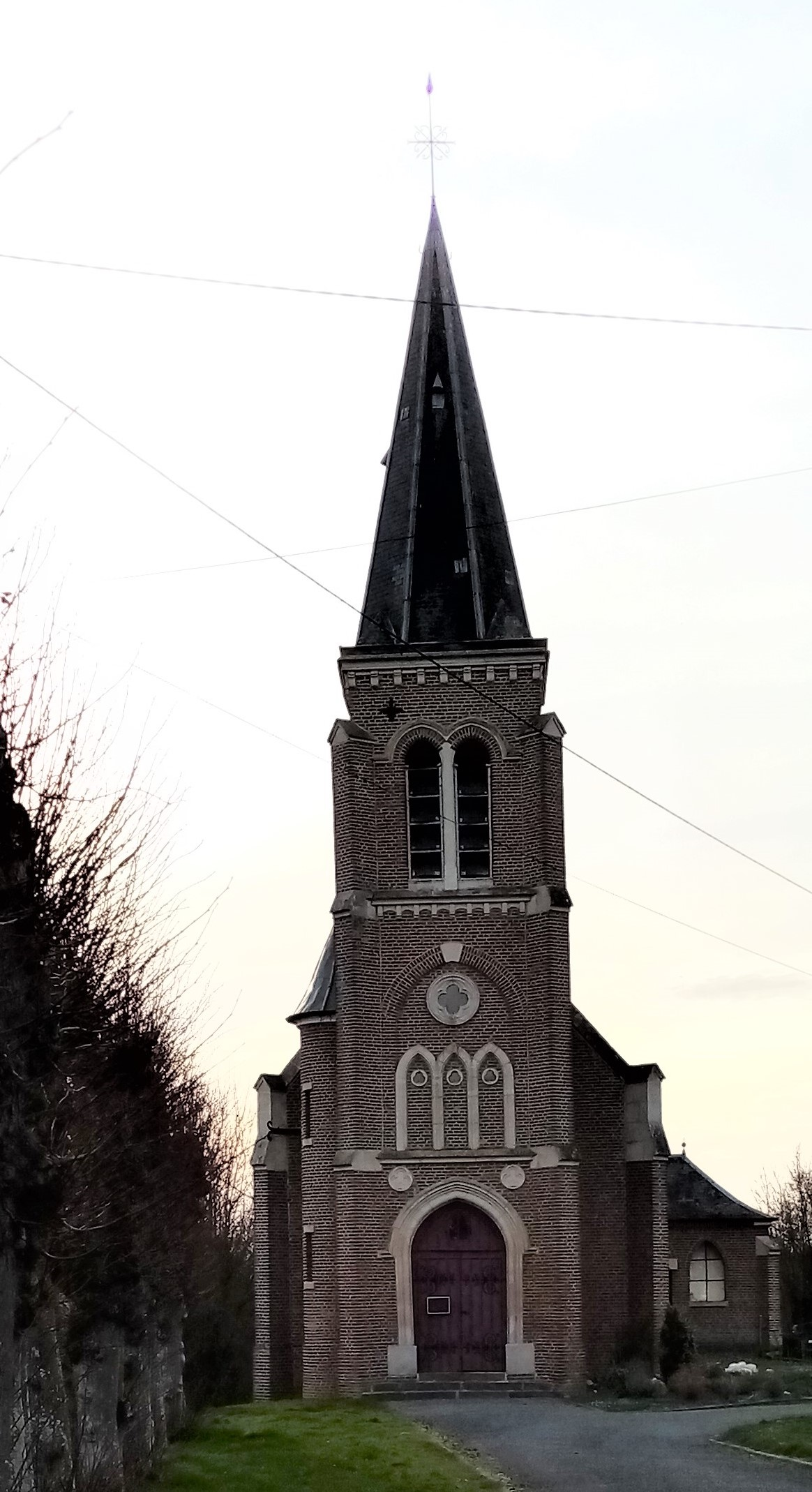

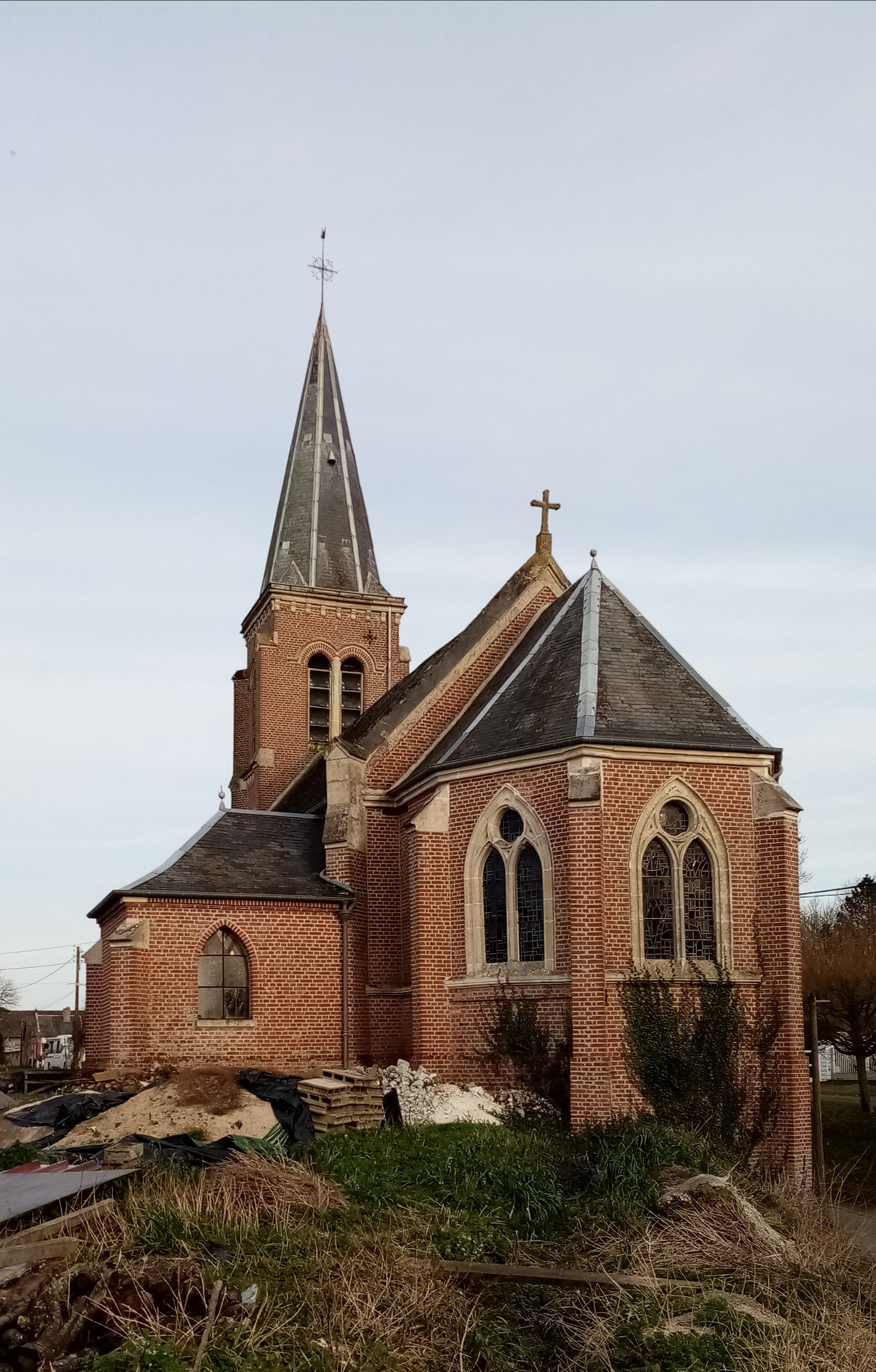

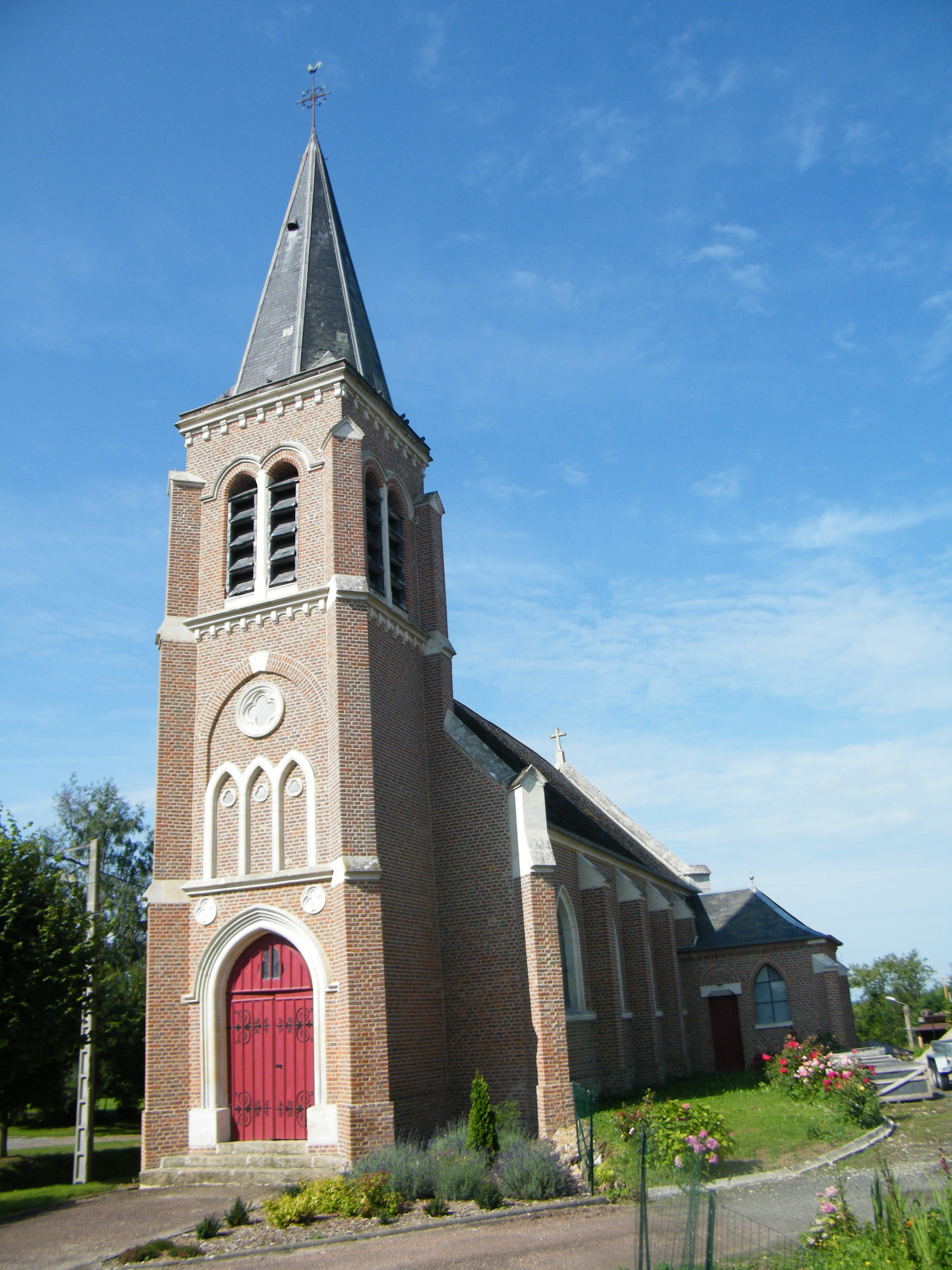

== See also ==
- Communes of the Somme department
