= Mouflières =

- Commune
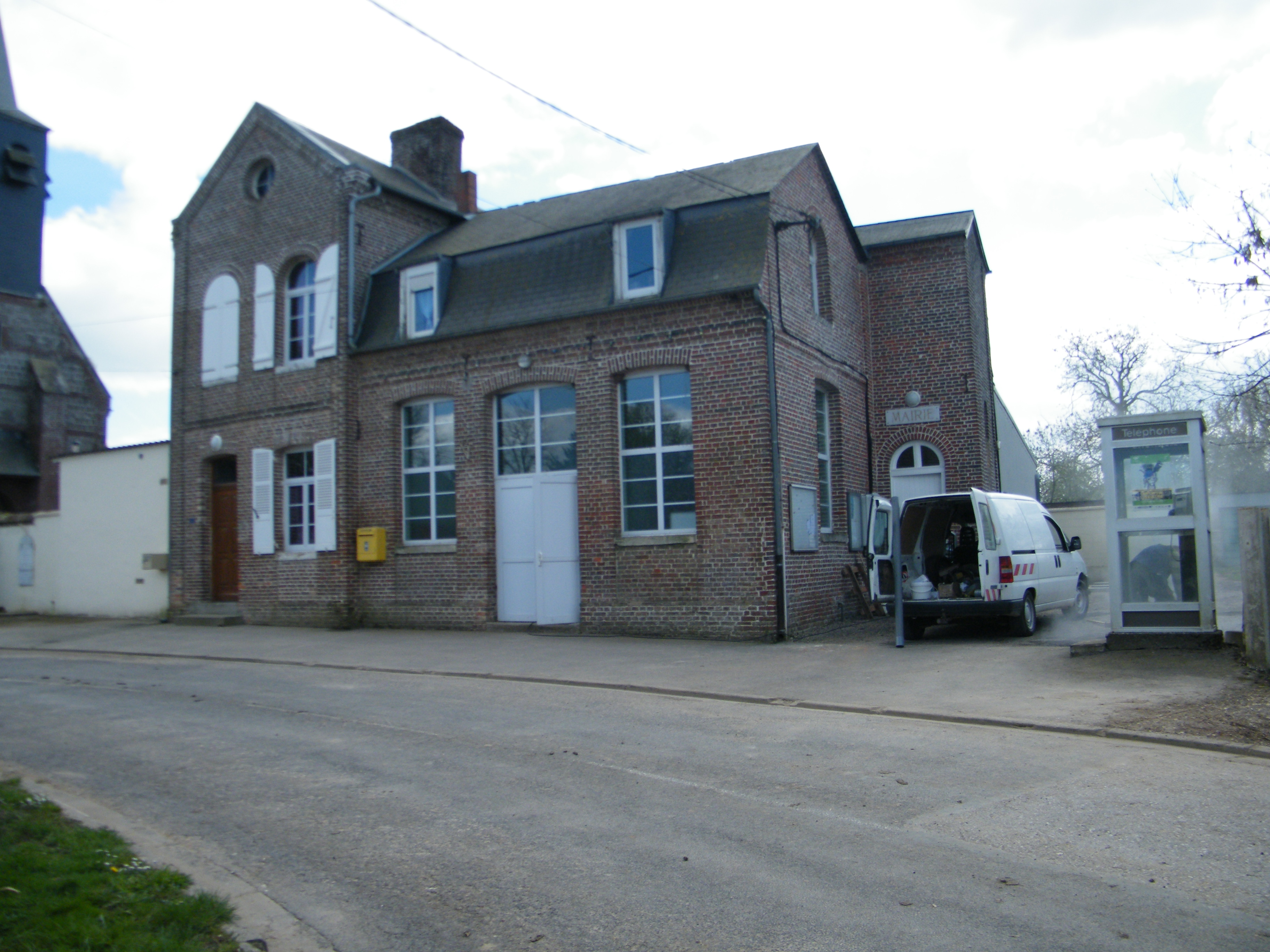
- The town hall in Mouflières
- Location of Mouflières
- Location within France Location within Hauts-de-France
- Coordinates: 49°55′22″N 1°44′35″E
- Country: France
- Region: Hauts-de-France
- Department: Somme
- Arrondissement: Amiens
- Canton: Poix-de-Picardie
- Intercommunality: CC Somme Sud-Ouest

Government
  - Mayor (2020–2026): Claude Morel
- Area^{1}: 2.76 km^{2} (1.07 sq mi)
- Elevation: 150 m (490 ft)
- Highest elevation: 152 m (499 ft)
- Lowest elevation: 114 m (374 ft)
- Population (2023): 75
  - Density: 27/km^{2} (70/sq mi)
- Time zone: UTC+01:00 (CET)
  - Summer (DST): UTC+02:00 (CEST)
- INSEE/Postal code: 80575 /80140
- ^{1} French Land Register data, which excludes lakes, ponds, glaciers > 1 km^{2} (0.386 sq mi or 247 acres) and river estuaries.

Mouflières (French pronunciation: [muflijɛʁ]) is a commune in the Somme department in Hauts-de-France in northern France.

== Geography ==
The commune is situated on the D25 road, some 15 miles (24 km) south of Abbeville.

== Population ==
Historical population
Year	Pop.	±% p.a.
1968	90	—
1975	96	+0.93%
1982	86	−1.56%
1990	74	−1.86%
1999	71	−0.46%
2007	89	+2.86%
2012	96	+1.53%
2017	86	−2.18%
2023	75	−2.26%
Source: INSEE

== See also ==
- Communes of the Somme department
