= Aumâtre =

- Commune
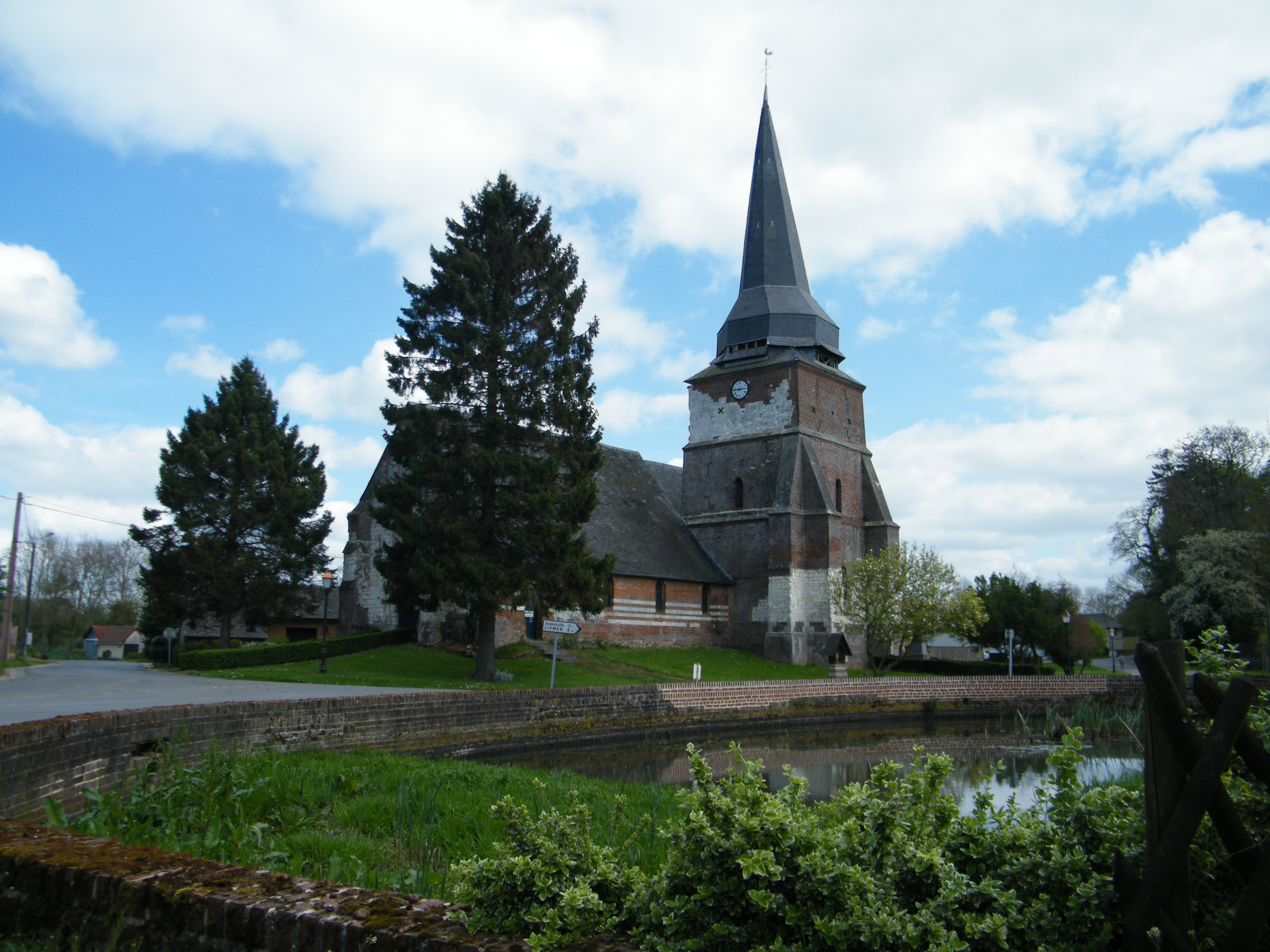
- The church in Aumâtre
- Location of Aumâtre
- Location within France Location within Hauts-de-France
- Coordinates: 49°55′13″N 1°46′23″E
- Country: France
- Region: Hauts-de-France
- Department: Somme
- Arrondissement: Amiens
- Canton: Poix-de-Picardie
- Intercommunality: CC Somme Sud-Ouest

Government
  - Mayor (2020–2026): Louis Quevauvillers
- Area^{1}: 5.57 km^{2} (2.15 sq mi)
- Elevation: 144 m (472 ft)
- Highest elevation: 151 m (495 ft)
- Lowest elevation: 86 m (282 ft)
- Population (2023): 170
  - Density: 31/km^{2} (79/sq mi)
- Time zone: UTC+01:00 (CET)
  - Summer (DST): UTC+02:00 (CEST)
- INSEE/Postal code: 80040 /80140
- ^{1} French Land Register data, which excludes lakes, ponds, glaciers > 1 km^{2} (0.386 sq mi or 247 acres) and river estuaries.

Aumâtre (French pronunciation: [omatʁ]; Picard: Aumate) is a commune in the Somme department in Hauts-de-France in northern France.

== See also ==
- Communes of the Somme department
