= Étréjust =

- Commune
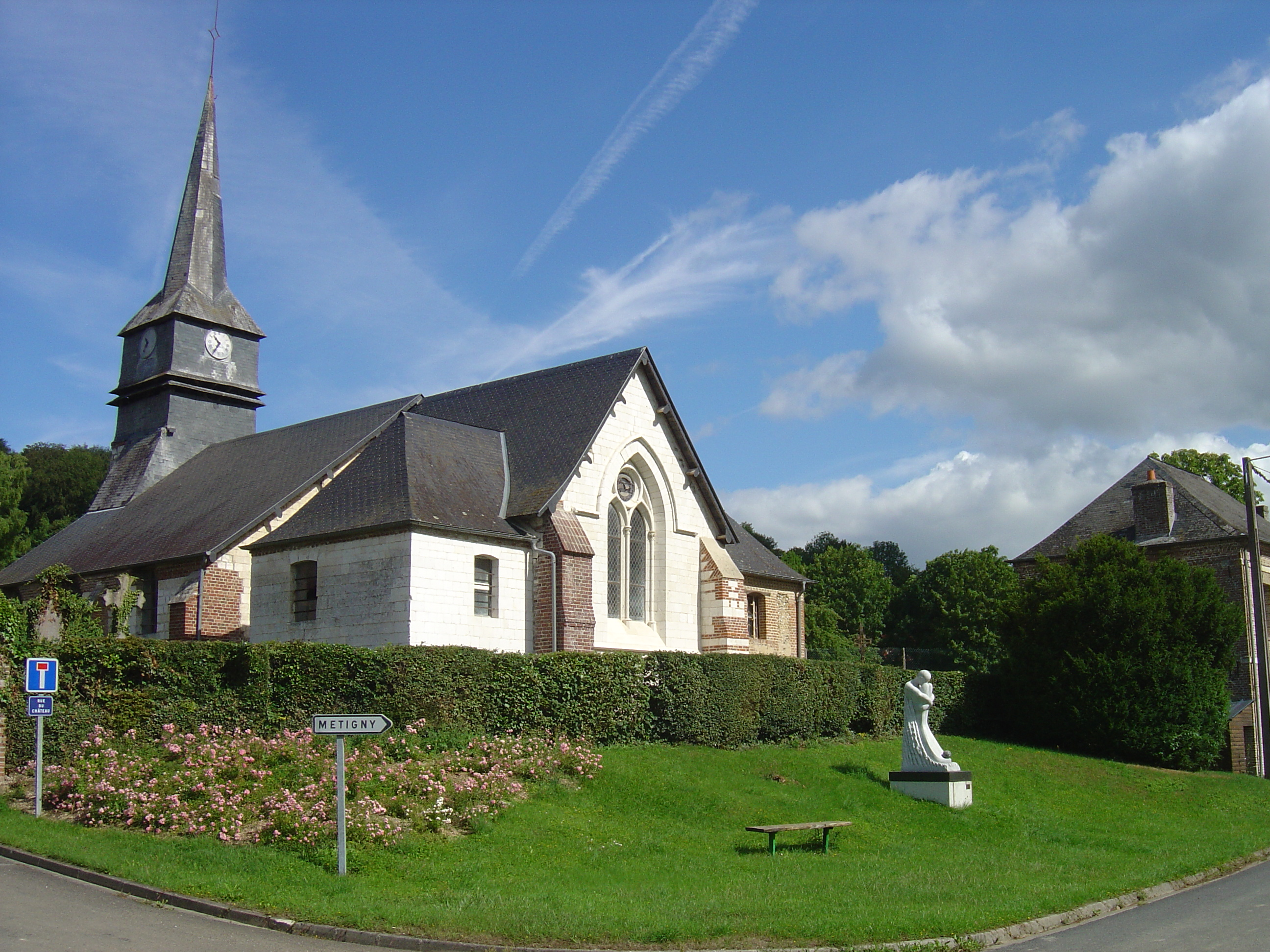
- Church in Étréjust
- Location of Étréjust
- Location within France Location within Hauts-de-France
- Coordinates: 49°54′45″N 1°53′25″E
- Country: France
- Region: Hauts-de-France
- Department: Somme
- Arrondissement: Amiens
- Canton: Poix-de-Picardie
- Intercommunality: CC Somme Sud-Ouest

Government
  - Mayor (2026–32): Céline Beaucourt
- Area^{1}: 3.78 km^{2} (1.46 sq mi)
- Elevation: 72 m (236 ft)
- Highest elevation: 128 m (420 ft)
- Lowest elevation: 52 m (171 ft)
- Population (2023): 42
  - Density: 11/km^{2} (29/sq mi)
- Time zone: UTC+01:00 (CET)
  - Summer (DST): UTC+02:00 (CEST)
- INSEE/Postal code: 80297 /80140
- ^{1} French Land Register data, which excludes lakes, ponds, glaciers > 1 km^{2} (0.386 sq mi or 247 acres) and river estuaries.

Étréjust (Picard: Utruju) is a commune in the Somme department in Hauts-de-France in northern France.

== Geography ==
Étréjust is situated at the junction of the D157a and D157b roads, some 34 km (21 mi) west of Amiens.

== Population ==
Historical population
Year	Pop.	±% p.a.
1968	54	—
1975	48	−1.67%
1982	47	−0.30%
1990	40	−2.00%
1999	39	−0.28%
2007	43	+1.23%
2012	44	+0.46%
2017	44	+0.00%
2023	42	−0.77%
Source: INSEE

== See also ==
- Communes of the Somme department
