= Nesle-l'Hôpital =

- Commune
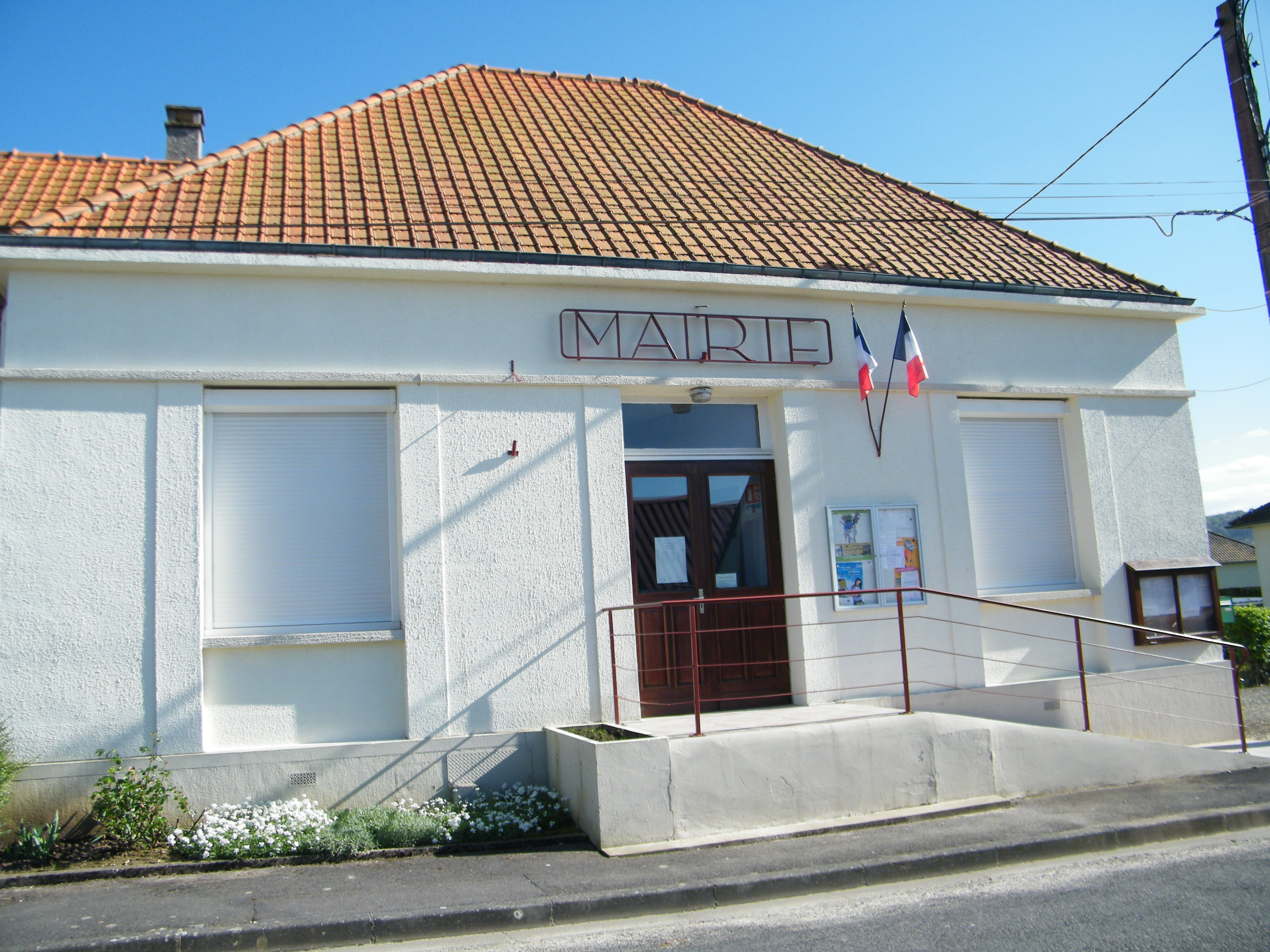
- The town hall in Nesle-l'Hôpital
- Location of Nesle-l'Hôpital
- Location within France Location within Hauts-de-France
- Coordinates: 49°54′27″N 1°41′29″E
- Country: France
- Region: Hauts-de-France
- Department: Somme
- Arrondissement: Amiens
- Canton: Poix-de-Picardie
- Intercommunality: CC Somme Sud-Ouest

Government
  - Mayor (2020–2026): Christophe Blampoix
- Area^{1}: 4.8 km^{2} (1.9 sq mi)
- Elevation: 50 m (160 ft)
- Highest elevation: 177 m (581 ft)
- Lowest elevation: 56 m (184 ft)
- Population (2023): 174
  - Density: 36/km^{2} (94/sq mi)
- Time zone: UTC+01:00 (CET)
  - Summer (DST): UTC+02:00 (CEST)
- INSEE/Postal code: 80586 /80140
- ^{1} French Land Register data, which excludes lakes, ponds, glaciers > 1 km^{2} (0.386 sq mi or 247 acres) and river estuaries.

Nesle-l'Hôpital (French pronunciation: [nɛl lopital]) is a commune in the Somme department in Hauts-de-France in northern France.

== Geography ==
The commune is situated on the D1015 road, some 16 miles (26 km) southwest of Abbeville, on the banks of the river Bresle, the border with Seine-Maritime.

== Population ==
Historical population
Year	Pop.	±% p.a.
1968	179	—
1975	155	−2.04%
1982	163	+0.72%
1990	176	+0.96%
1999	158	−1.19%
2007	184	+1.92%
2012	157	−3.12%
2017	156	−0.13%
2023	174	+1.84%
Source: INSEE

== See also ==
- Communes of the Somme department
