= Villeroy, Somme =

Villeroy
- Commune
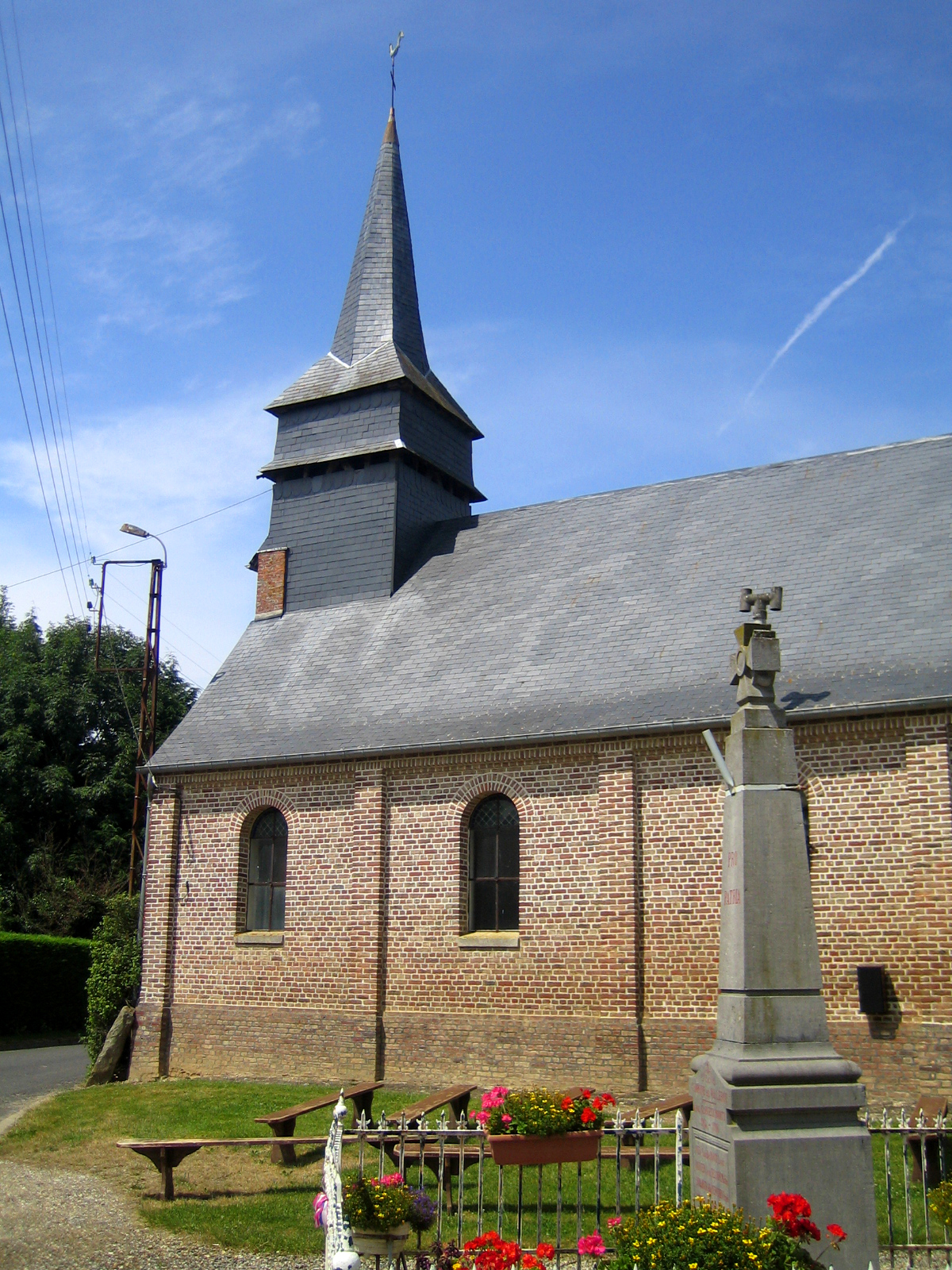
- The church and war memorial in Villeroy
- Location of Villeroy
- Location within France Location within Hauts-de-France
- Coordinates: 49°56′25″N 1°43′28″E
- Country: France
- Region: Hauts-de-France
- Department: Somme
- Arrondissement: Amiens
- Canton: Poix-de-Picardie
- Intercommunality: CC Somme Sud-Ouest

Government
  - Mayor (2020–2026): David Dancourt
- Area^{1}: 6.02 km^{2} (2.32 sq mi)
- Elevation: 139 m (456 ft)
- Highest elevation: 159 m (522 ft)
- Lowest elevation: 119 m (390 ft)
- Population (2023): 177
  - Density: 29.4/km^{2} (76.2/sq mi)
- Time zone: UTC+01:00 (CET)
  - Summer (DST): UTC+02:00 (CEST)
- INSEE/Postal code: 80796 /80140
- ^{1} French Land Register data, which excludes lakes, ponds, glaciers > 1 km^{2} (0.386 sq mi or 247 acres) and river estuaries.

Villeroy (French pronunciation: [vilʁwa]) is a commune in the Somme department in Hauts-de-France in northern France.

== Geography ==
Villeroy is situated 13 mi (21 km) southwest of Abbeville, on the D108e road

== Population ==
Historical population

Year	Pop.	±% p.a.
1793	318	—
1836	384	+0.44%
1866	344	−0.37%
1896	288	−0.59%
1936	222	−0.65%
1962	247	+0.41%
1968	242	−0.34%
1975	218	−1.48%

Year	Pop.	±% p.a.
1982	205	−0.87%
1990	210	+0.30%
1999	216	+0.31%
2007	215	−0.06%
2012	209	−0.56%
2017	190	−1.89%
2023	177	−1.17%

Source: EHESS and INSEE (1968-2023)

== History ==
The village was known as "Villa Regia", in 1129. It was once owned by the Knights Templar who built a wall around the village.
The seigneury was first noted as Bailleul-Vimeu, which was then passed to the seigneurs of Rambures.

== Places of interest ==
- The church of Saint Sauveur, rebuilt in the 19th century.

== See also ==
- Communes of the Somme department
