= Heucourt-Croquoison =

- Commune
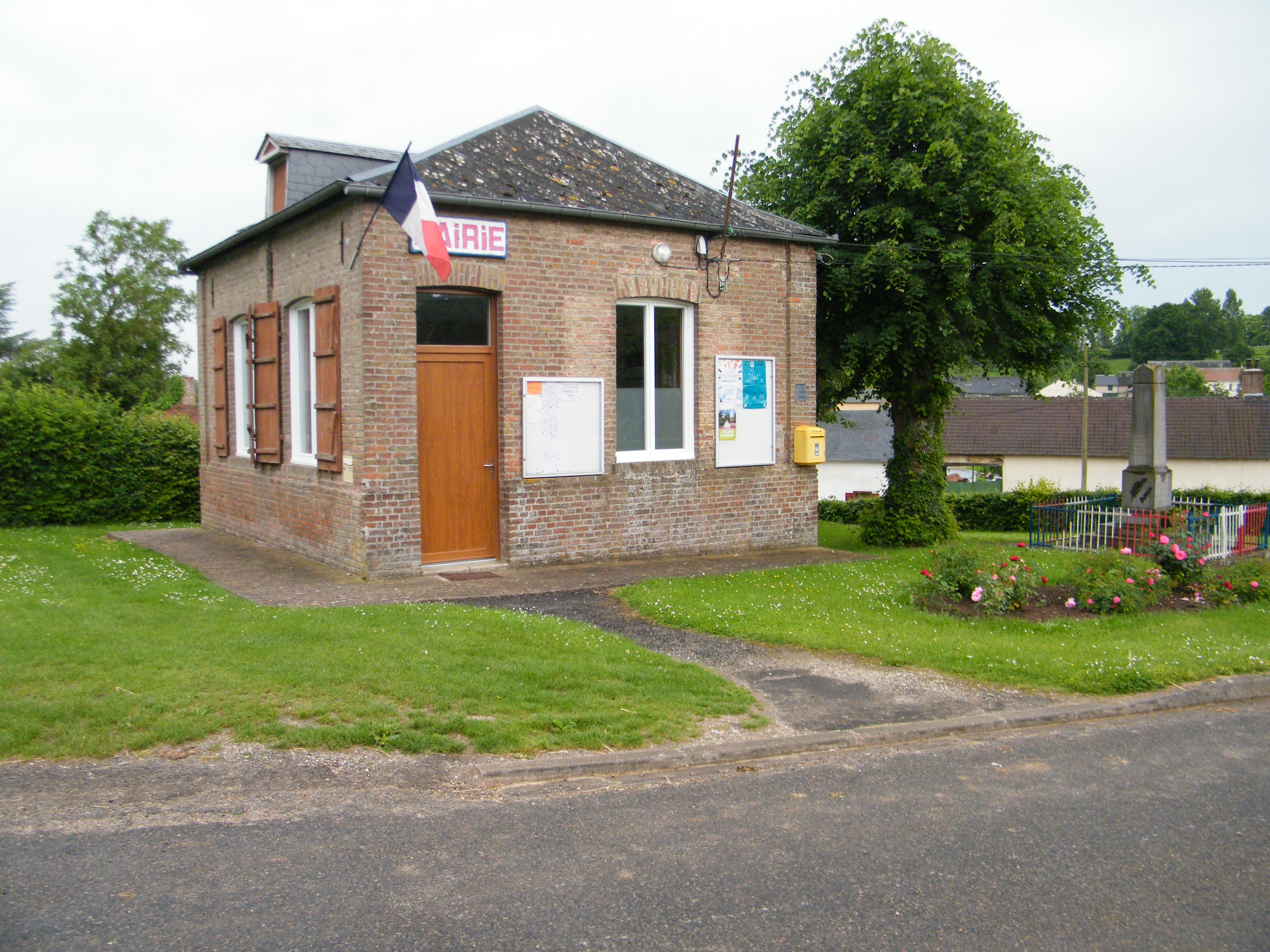
- The town hall in Heucourt

- Coat of arms
- Location of Heucourt-Croquoison
- Location within France Location within Hauts-de-France
- Coordinates: 49°55′53″N 1°53′01″E
- Country: France
- Region: Hauts-de-France
- Department: Somme
- Arrondissement: Amiens
- Canton: Poix-de-Picardie
- Intercommunality: CC Somme Sud-Ouest

Government
  - Mayor (2020–2026): Florence Vaquer
- Area^{1}: 5 km^{2} (1.9 sq mi)
- Elevation: 80 m (260 ft)
- Highest elevation: 129 m (423 ft)
- Lowest elevation: 48 m (157 ft)
- Population (2023): 108
  - Density: 22/km^{2} (56/sq mi)
- Time zone: UTC+01:00 (CET)
  - Summer (DST): UTC+02:00 (CEST)
- INSEE/Postal code: 80437 /80270
- ^{1} French Land Register data, which excludes lakes, ponds, glaciers > 1 km^{2} (0.386 sq mi or 247 acres) and river estuaries.

Heucourt-Croquoison (French pronunciation: [økuʁ kʁɔkwazɔ̃]) is a commune in the Somme department in Hauts-de-France in northern France.

== Geography ==
The commune is situated on the D96 road, 26 kilometres (16 mi) south of Abbeville.

== Population ==
Historical population
Year	Pop.	±% p.a.
1968	104	—
1975	104	+0.00%
1982	82	−3.34%
1990	89	+1.03%
1999	101	+1.42%
2007	115	+1.64%
2012	120	+0.85%
2017	117	−0.51%
2023	108	−1.33%
Source: INSEE

== See also ==
- Communes of the Somme department
