= Foucaucourt-Hors-Nesle =

- Commune
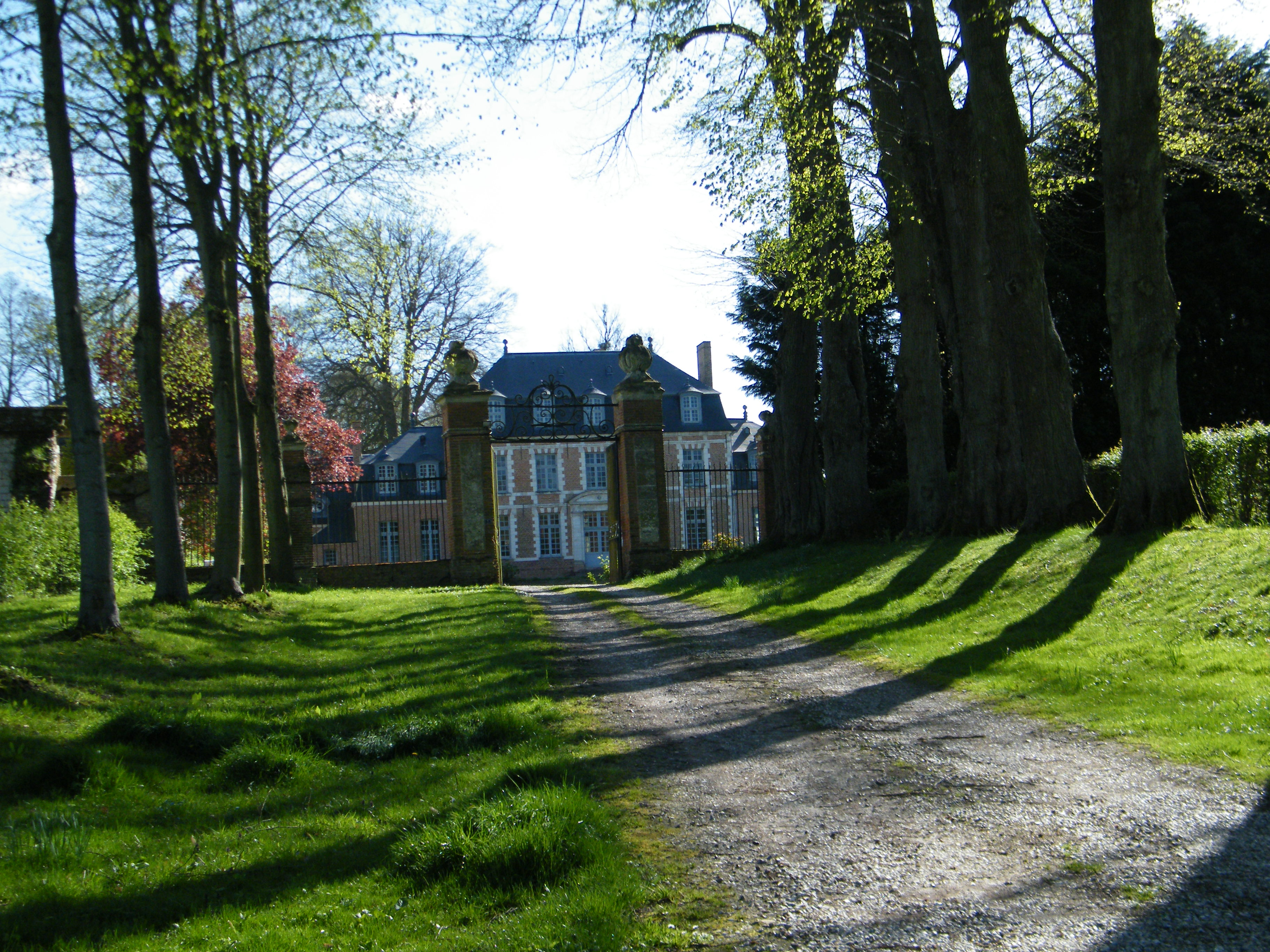
- Castle
- Location of Foucaucourt-Hors-Nesle
- Location within France Location within Hauts-de-France
- Coordinates: 49°55′01″N 1°43′29″E
- Country: France
- Region: Hauts-de-France
- Department: Somme
- Arrondissement: Amiens
- Canton: Poix-de-Picardie
- Intercommunality: CC Somme Sud-Ouest

Government
  - Mayor (2020–2026): Jean-Pierre Ricouart
- Area^{1}: 2.94 km^{2} (1.14 sq mi)
- Elevation: 82 m (269 ft)
- Highest elevation: 177 m (581 ft)
- Lowest elevation: 143 m (469 ft)
- Population (2023): 79
  - Density: 27/km^{2} (70/sq mi)
- Time zone: UTC+01:00 (CET)
  - Summer (DST): UTC+02:00 (CEST)
- INSEE/Postal code: 80336 /80140
- ^{1} French Land Register data, which excludes lakes, ponds, glaciers > 1 km^{2} (0.386 sq mi or 247 acres) and river estuaries.

Foucaucourt-Hors-Nesle (French pronunciation: [fukokuʁ ɔʁ nɛl], literally Foucaucourt outside Nesle; Picard: Foucaucourt-Hors-Nèle) is a commune in the Somme department in Hauts-de-France in northern France.

== Geography ==
The commune is situated at the junction of the D110 and D25 roads, some 18 miles (29 km) southwest of Abbeville near the banks of the Bresle.

== Population ==
Historical population
Year	Pop.	±% p.a.
1968	82	—
1975	80	−0.35%
1982	77	−0.54%
1990	81	+0.64%
1999	68	−1.93%
2007	73	+0.89%
2012	68	−1.41%
2017	80	+3.30%
2023	79	−0.21%
Source: INSEE

== See also ==
- Communes of the Somme department
