= Fresneville =

- Commune
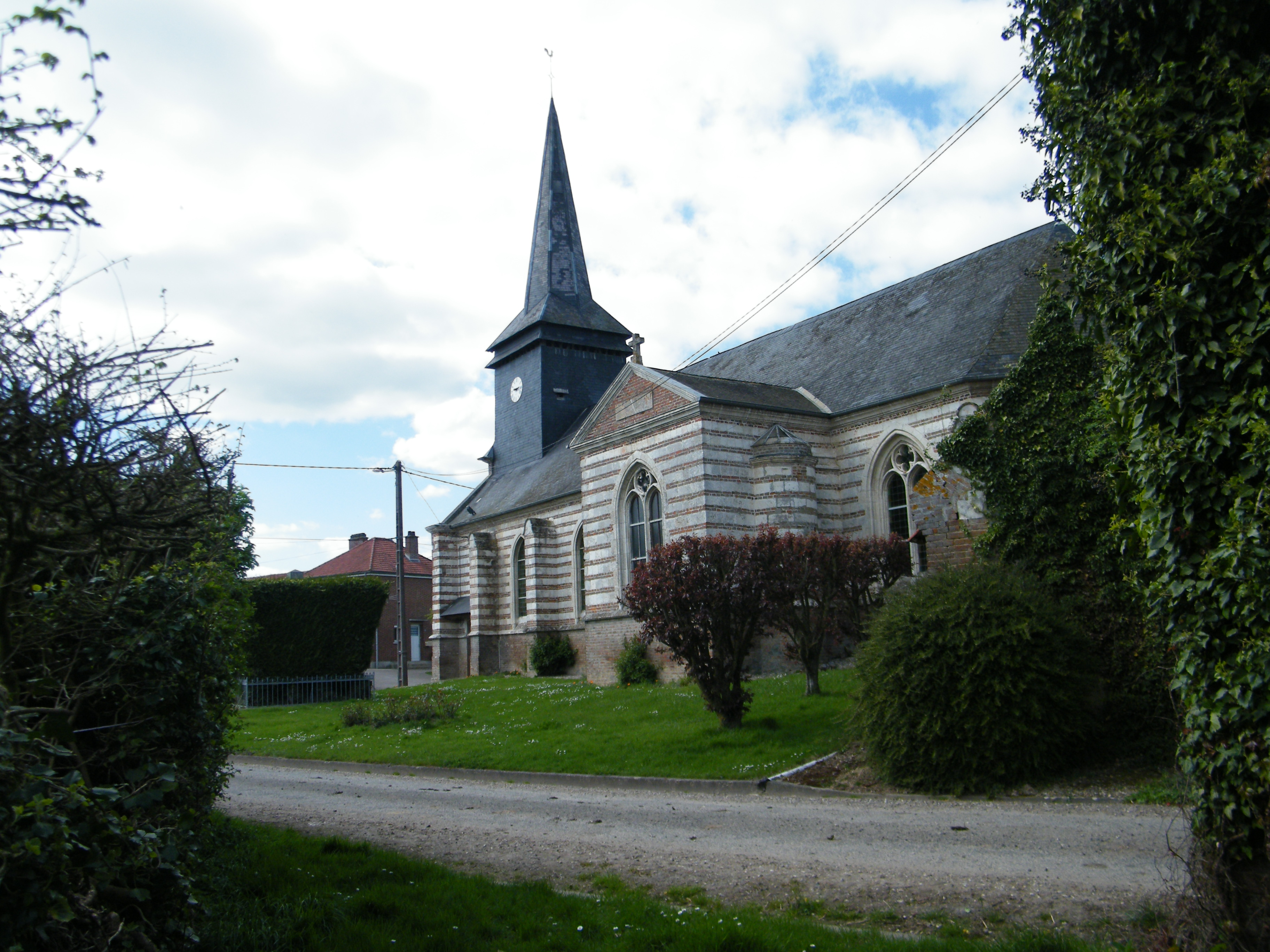
- The church in Fresneville
- Location of Fresneville
- Location within France Location within Hauts-de-France
- Coordinates: 49°53′26″N 1°49′38″E
- Country: France
- Region: Hauts-de-France
- Department: Somme
- Arrondissement: Amiens
- Canton: Poix-de-Picardie
- Intercommunality: CC Somme Sud-Ouest

Government
  - Mayor (2020–2026): Alain Calippe
- Area^{1}: 3.4 km^{2} (1.3 sq mi)
- Elevation: 147 m (482 ft)
- Highest elevation: 158 m (518 ft)
- Lowest elevation: 105 m (344 ft)
- Population (2023): 104
  - Density: 31/km^{2} (79/sq mi)
- Time zone: UTC+01:00 (CET)
  - Summer (DST): UTC+02:00 (CEST)
- INSEE/Postal code: 80355 /80140
- ^{1} French Land Register data, which excludes lakes, ponds, glaciers > 1 km^{2} (0.386 sq mi or 247 acres) and river estuaries.

Fresneville (French pronunciation: [fʁɛnvil]) is a commune in the Somme department in Hauts-de-France in northern France.

== Geography ==
Fresneville is situated on the D29 and D26 crossroads, some 17 miles (27 km) south of Abbeville.

== Population ==
Historical population
Year	Pop.	±% p.a.
1968	104	—
1975	95	−1.28%
1982	77	−2.96%
1990	69	−1.36%
1999	78	+1.37%
2007	102	+3.41%
2012	105	+0.58%
2017	105	+0.00%
2023	104	−0.16%
Source: INSEE

== See also ==
- Communes of the Somme department
