= Frettecuisse =

- Commune
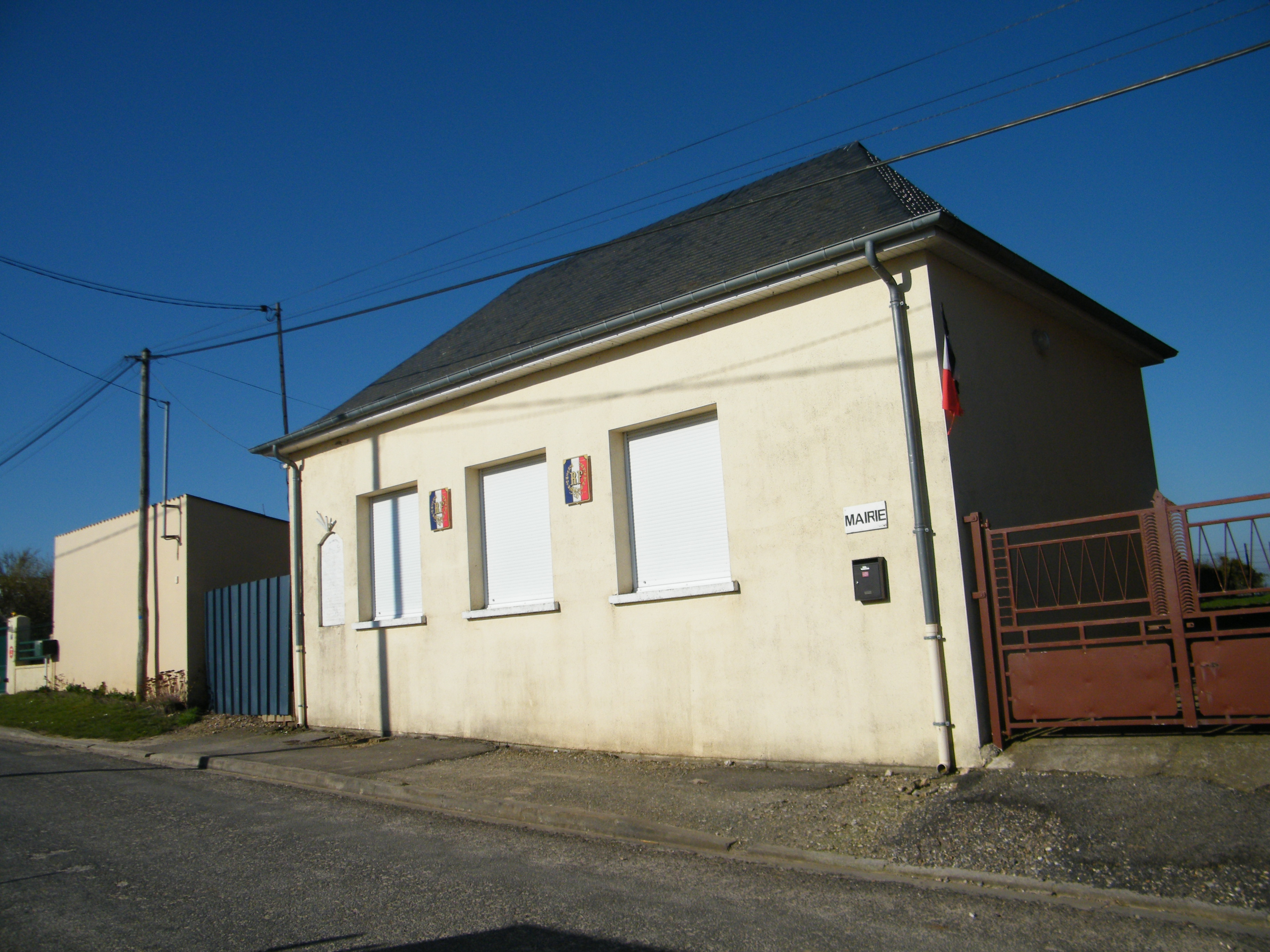
- The town hall in Frettecuisse
- Location of Frettecuisse
- Location within France Location within Hauts-de-France
- Coordinates: 49°55′28″N 1°48′46″E
- Country: France
- Region: Hauts-de-France
- Department: Somme
- Arrondissement: Amiens
- Canton: Poix-de-Picardie
- Intercommunality: CC Somme Sud-Ouest

Government
  - Mayor (2020–2026): Agnès Facquet
- Area^{1}: 5.27 km^{2} (2.03 sq mi)
- Elevation: 107 m (351 ft)
- Highest elevation: 143 m (469 ft)
- Lowest elevation: 83 m (272 ft)
- Population (2023): 69
  - Density: 13/km^{2} (34/sq mi)
- Time zone: UTC+01:00 (CET)
  - Summer (DST): UTC+02:00 (CEST)
- INSEE/Postal code: 80361 /80140
- ^{1} French Land Register data, which excludes lakes, ponds, glaciers > 1 km^{2} (0.386 sq mi or 247 acres) and river estuaries.

Frettecuisse (French pronunciation: [fʁɛtkɥis]) is a commune in the Somme department in Hauts-de-France in northern France.

== Geography ==
Frettecuisse is situated on the D29 road, some 25 km (16 mi) south of Abbeville.

== Population ==
Historical population
Year	Pop.	±% p.a.
1968	97	—
1975	113	+2.21%
1982	92	−2.89%
1990	79	−1.89%
1999	68	−1.65%
2007	72	+0.72%
2012	72	+0.00%
2017	74	+0.55%
2023	69	−1.16%
Source: INSEE

== Places of interest ==
- The church

== See also ==
- Communes of the Somme department
