= Arrondissements of the Somme department =

Administrative divisions of Somme, France

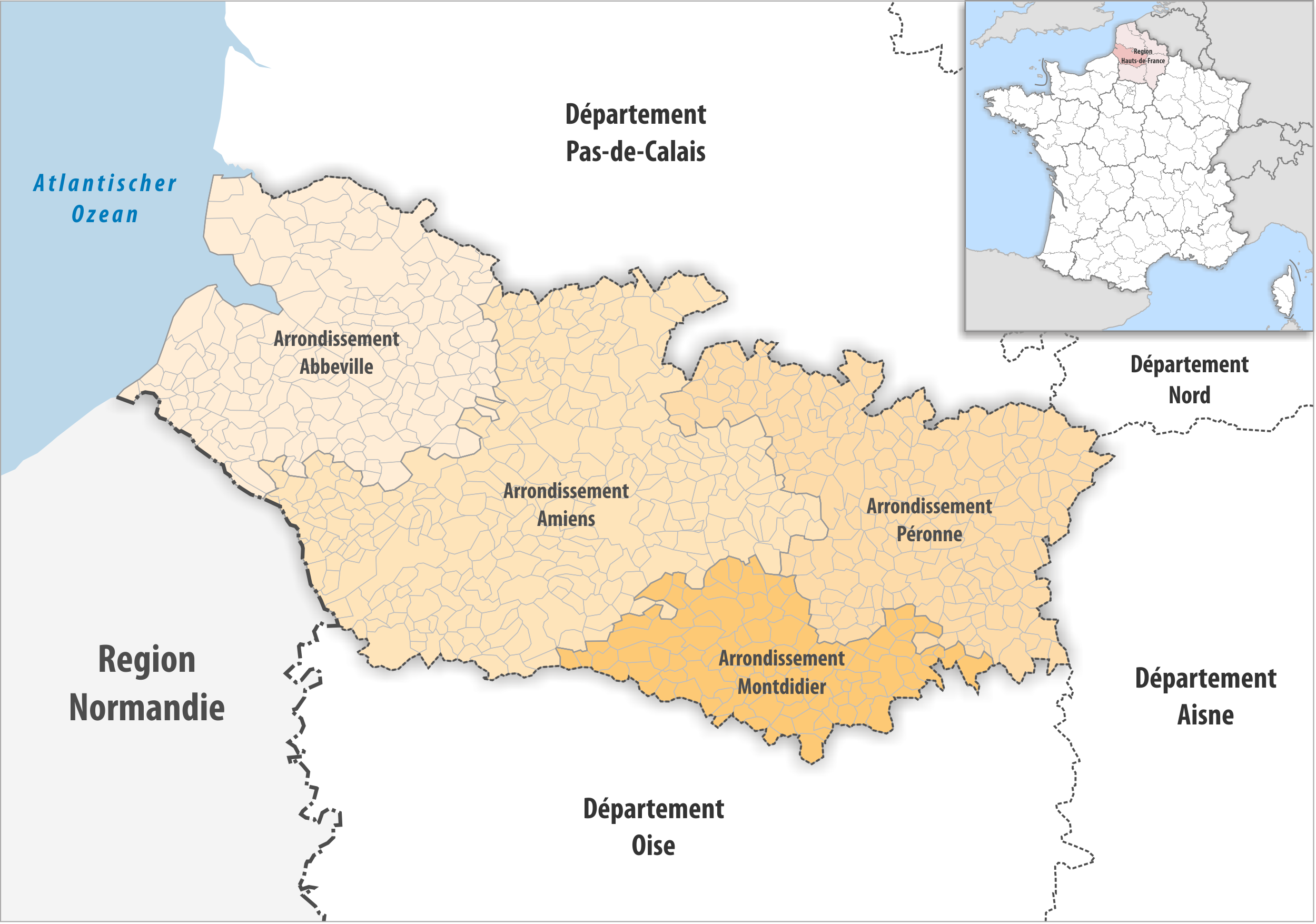
Map of arrondissements of the Somme department.

The 4 arrondissements of the Somme department are:

1. Arrondissement of Abbeville, (subprefecture: Abbeville) with 164 communes. The population of the arrondissement was 122,466 in 2021.
2. Arrondissement of Amiens, (prefecture of the Somme department: Amiens) with 291 communes. The population of the arrondissement was 304,331 in 2021.
3. Arrondissement of Montdidier, (subprefecture: Montdidier) with 109 communes. The population of the arrondissement was 46,920 in 2021.
4. Arrondissement of Péronne, (subprefecture: Péronne) with 208 communes. The population of the arrondissement was 92,535 in 2021.

== History ==
In 1800 the arrondissements of Amiens, Abbeville, Doullens, Montdidier and Péronne were established. The arrondissement of Doullens was disbanded in 1926. In January 2009 the canton of Oisemont passed from the arrondissement of Amiens to the arrondissement of Abbeville.

The borders of the arrondissements of Somme were modified in January 2017:

- 38 communes from the arrondissement of Abbeville to the arrondissement of Amiens
- two communes from the arrondissement of Amiens to the arrondissement of Abbeville
- five communes from the arrondissement of Amiens to the arrondissement of Montdidier
- 28 communes from the arrondissement of Amiens to the arrondissement of Péronne
- 26 communes from the arrondissement of Montdidier to the arrondissement of Péronne
- seven communes from the arrondissement of Péronne to the arrondissement of Amiens
