= Bresle =

- Commune
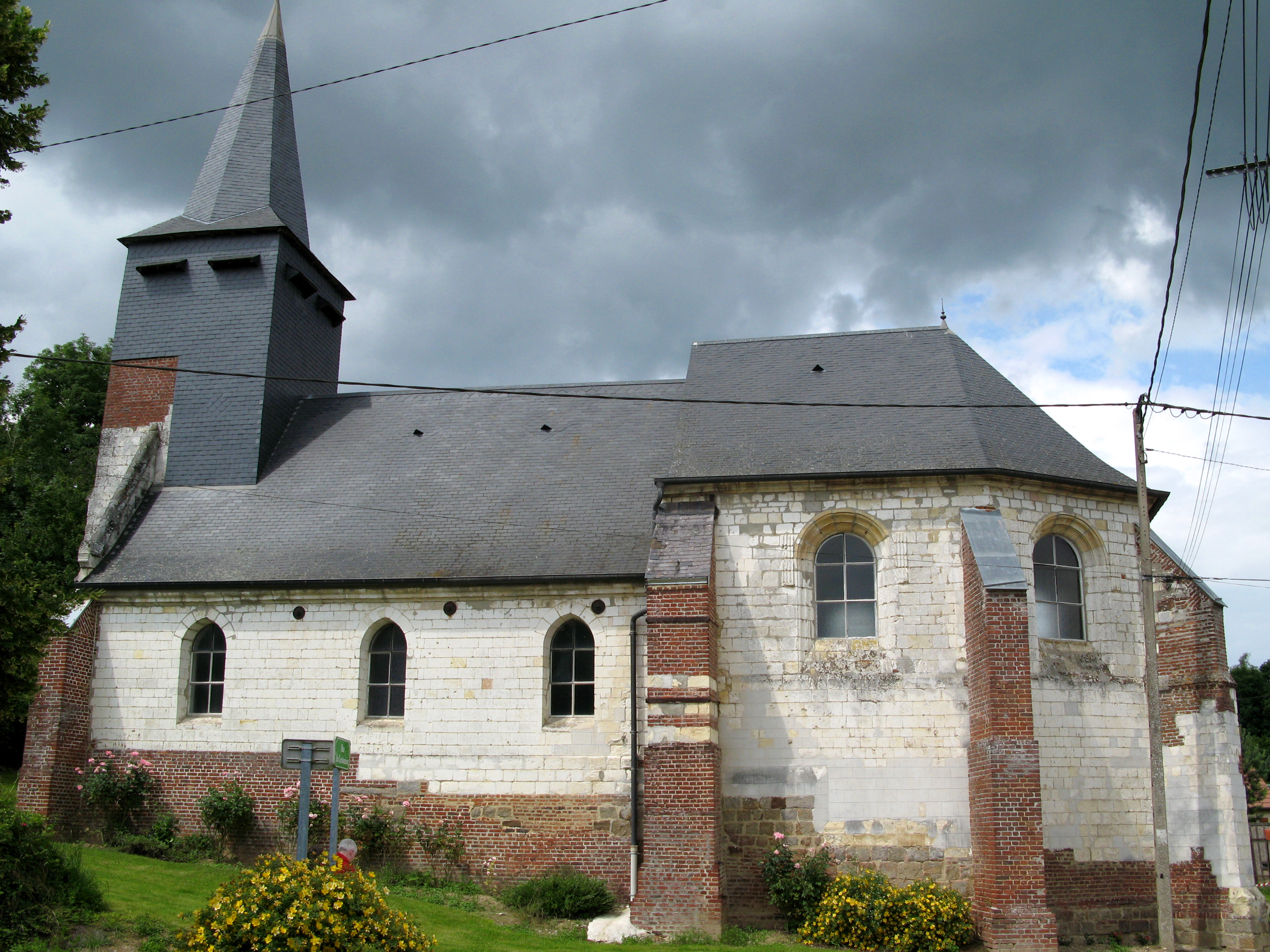
- The church in Bresle

- Coat of arms
- Location of Bresle
- Location within France Location within Hauts-de-France
- Coordinates: 49°59′02″N 2°33′29″E
- Country: France
- Region: Hauts-de-France
- Department: Somme
- Arrondissement: Amiens
- Canton: Corbie
- Intercommunality: Val de Somme

Government
  - Mayor (2020–2026): Jean-Luc Faloise
- Area^{1}: 3.54 km^{2} (1.37 sq mi)
- Elevation: 62 m (203 ft)
- Highest elevation: 123 m (404 ft)
- Lowest elevation: 55 m (180 ft)
- Population (2023): 120
  - Density: 34/km^{2} (88/sq mi)
- Time zone: UTC+01:00 (CET)
  - Summer (DST): UTC+02:00 (CEST)
- INSEE/Postal code: 80138 /80300
- ^{1} French Land Register data, which excludes lakes, ponds, glaciers > 1 km^{2} (0.386 sq mi or 247 acres) and river estuaries.

Bresle (French pronunciation: [bʁɛl]; Picard: Brèle) is a commune in the Somme department in Hauts-de-France in northern France.

== Geography ==
Bresle is situated on the D226 road, some 16 miles (26 km) northwest of Amiens.

== Population ==
Historical population
Year	Pop.	±% p.a.
1968	102	—
1975	92	−1.46%
1982	90	−0.31%
1990	83	−1.01%
1999	74	−1.27%
2007	96	+3.31%
2012	123	+5.08%
2017	128	+0.80%
2023	120	−1.07%
Source: INSEE

== See also ==
- Communes of the Somme department
