= Cantons of the Somme department =

The following is a list of the 23 cantons of the Somme department, in France, following the French canton reorganisation which came into effect in March 2015:

- Abbeville-1
- Abbeville-2
- Ailly-sur-Noye
- Ailly-sur-Somme
- Albert
- Amiens-1
- Amiens-2
- Amiens-3
- Amiens-4
- Amiens-5
- Amiens-6
- Amiens-7
- Corbie
- Doullens
- Flixecourt
- Friville-Escarbotin
- Gamaches
- Ham
- Moreuil
- Péronne
- Poix-de-Picardie
- Roye
- Rue
