= Arrondissement of Amiens =

Coordinates: 49°54′N 2°17′E

Amiens
- Arrondissement
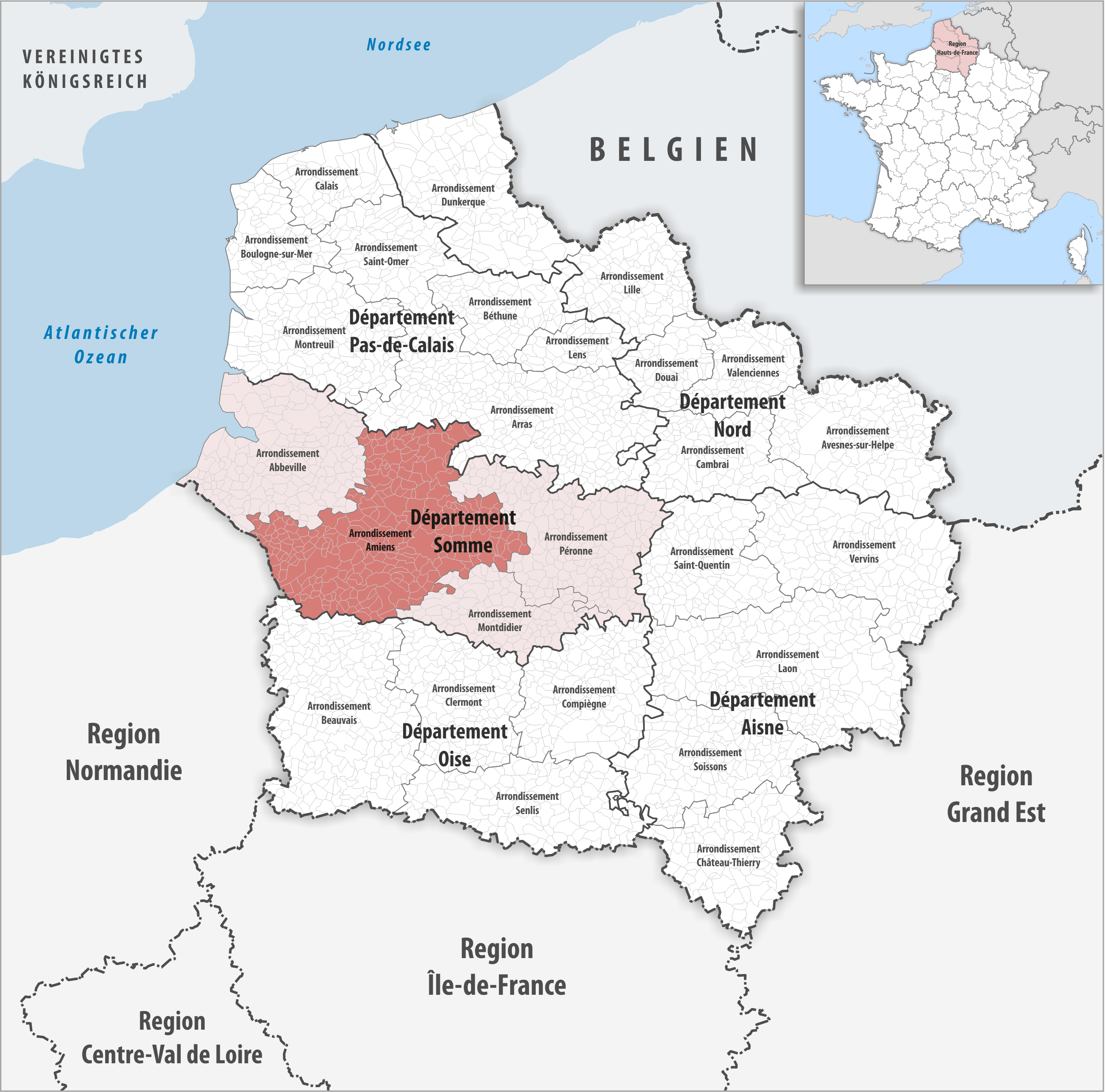
- Location within the region Hauts-de-France
- Country: France
- Region: Hauts-de-France
- Department: Somme
- No. of communes: {{{nbcomm}}}
- Area: 2,343.1 km^{2} (904.7 sq mi)
- Population (2023): 306,069
  - Density: 130.63/km^{2} (338.32/sq mi)
- INSEE code: 802

The arrondissement of Amiens is an arrondissement of France in the Somme department in the Hauts-de-France region. It has 291 communes. Its population is 304,331 (2021), and its area is 2,343.1 km^{2} (904.7 sq mi).

== Composition ==
The communes of the arrondissement of Amiens are:

1. Agenville (80005)
2. Ailly-sur-Somme (80011)
3. Airaines (80013)
4. Allonville (80020)
5. Amiens (80021)
6. Andainville (80022)
7. Argœuves (80024)
8. Arguel (80026)
9. Aubigny (80036)
10. Aumâtre (80040)
11. Aumont (80041)
12. Autheux (80042)
13. Authieule (80044)
14. Avelesges (80046)
15. Avesnes-Chaussoy (80048)
16. Bacouel-sur-Selle (80050)
17. Baizieux (80052)
18. Barly (80055)
19. Bavelincourt (80056)
20. Béalcourt (80060)
21. Beaucamps-le-Jeune (80061)
22. Beaucamps-le-Vieux (80062)
23. Beaucourt-sur-l'Hallue (80066)
24. Beaumetz (80068)
25. Beauquesne (80070)
26. Beauval (80071)
27. Béhencourt (80077)
28. Belleuse (80079)
29. Belloy-Saint-Léonard (80081)
30. Belloy-sur-Somme (80082)
31. Bergicourt (80083)
32. Bermesnil (80084)
33. Bernâtre (80085)
34. Bernaville (80086)
35. Berneuil (80089)
36. Bertangles (80092)
37. Berteaucourt-les-Dames (80093)
38. Bettembos (80098)
39. Bettencourt-Saint-Ouen (80100)
40. Blangy-sous-Poix (80106)
41. Blangy-Tronville (80107)
42. Boisbergues (80108)
43. Bonnay (80112)
44. Bonneville (80113)
45. Bosquel (80114)
46. Bouchon (80117)
47. Bougainville (80119)
48. Bouquemaison (80122)
49. Bourdon (80123)
50. Bovelles (80130)
51. Boves (80131)
52. Brassy (80134)
53. Breilly (80137)
54. Bresle (80138)
55. Brévillers (80140)
56. Briquemesnil-Floxicourt (80142)
57. Brocourt (80143)
58. Bussy-lès-Daours (80156)
59. Bussy-lès-Poix (80157)
60. Cachy (80159)
61. Cagny (80160)
62. Camon (80164)
63. Camps-en-Amiénois (80165)
64. Canaples (80166)
65. Candas (80168)
66. Cannessières (80169)
67. Cardonnette (80173)
68. Caulières (80179)
69. Cavillon (80180)
70. Cerisy (80184)
71. Cerisy-Buleux (80183)
72. La Chaussée-Tirancourt (80187)
73. Chipilly (80192)
74. Clairy-Saulchoix (80198)
75. Coisy (80202)
76. Contay (80207)
77. Conteville (80208)
78. Contre (80210)
79. Conty (80211)
80. Corbie (80212)
81. Courcelles-sous-Moyencourt (80218)
82. Courcelles-sous-Thoix (80219)
83. Creuse (80225)
84. Croixrault (80227)
85. Crouy-Saint-Pierre (80229)
86. Daours (80234)
87. Domart-en-Ponthieu (80241)
88. Domesmont (80243)
89. Domléger-Longvillers (80245)
90. Doullens (80253)
91. Dreuil-lès-Amiens (80256)
92. Dromesnil (80259)
93. Dury (80261)
94. Épaumesnil (80269)
95. Épécamps (80270)
96. Éplessier (80273)
97. Équennes-Éramecourt (80276)
98. Essertaux (80285)
99. Estrées-sur-Noye (80291)
100. L'Étoile (80296)
101. Étréjust (80297)
102. Famechon (80301)
103. Ferrières (80305)
104. Fieffes-Montrelet (80566)
105. Fienvillers (80310)
106. Flesselles (80316)
107. Fleury (80317)
108. Flixecourt (80318)
109. Fluy (80319)
110. Fontaine-le-Sec (80324)
111. Forceville-en-Vimeu (80330)
112. Fossemanant (80334)
113. Foucaucourt-Hors-Nesle (80336)
114. Fouilloy (80338)
115. Fourcigny (80340)
116. Fourdrinoy (80341)
117. Framicourt (80343)
118. Franqueville (80346)
119. Fransu (80348)
120. Franvillers (80350)
121. Fréchencourt (80351)
122. Frémontiers (80352)
123. Fresnes-Tilloloy (80354)
124. Fresneville (80355)
125. Fresnoy-Andainville (80356)
126. Fresnoy-au-Val (80357)
127. Frettecuisse (80361)
128. Fricamps (80365)
129. Frohen-sur-Authie (80369)
130. Gauville (80375)
131. Gentelles (80376)
132. Gézaincourt (80377)
133. Glisy (80379)
134. Gorges (80381)
135. Grattepanche (80387)
136. Grouches-Luchuel (80392)
137. Guignemicourt (80399)
138. Guizancourt (80402)
139. Halloy-lès-Pernois (80408)
140. Le Hamel (80411)
141. Hamelet (80412)
142. Hangest-sur-Somme (80416)
143. Havernas (80423)
144. Hébécourt (80424)
145. Heilly (80426)
146. Hem-Hardinval (80427)
147. Hénencourt (80429)
148. Hescamps (80436)
149. Heucourt-Croquoison (80437)
150. Heuzecourt (80439)
151. Hiermont (80440)
152. Hornoy-le-Bourg (80443)
153. Humbercourt (80445)
154. Inval-Boiron (80450)
155. Lachapelle (80455)
156. Lafresguimont-Saint-Martin (80456)
157. Lahoussoye (80458)
158. Laleu (80459)
159. Lamaronde (80460)
160. Lamotte-Brebière (80461)
161. Lamotte-Warfusée (80463)
162. Lanches-Saint-Hilaire (80466)
163. Lignières-Châtelain (80479)
164. Lignières-en-Vimeu (80480)
165. Liomer (80484)
166. Longueau (80489)
167. Longuevillette (80491)
168. Lucheux (80495)
169. Maizicourt (80503)
170. Marcelcave (80507)
171. Marlers (80515)
172. Le Mazis (80522)
173. Meigneux (80525)
174. Le Meillard (80526)
175. Méréaucourt (80528)
176. Méricourt-en-Vimeu (80531)
177. Méricourt-l'Abbé (80530)
178. Le Mesge (80535)
179. Métigny (80543)
180. Mézerolles (80544)
181. Mirvaux (80550)
182. Molliens-au-Bois (80553)
183. Molliens-Dreuil (80554)
184. Monsures (80558)
185. Montagne-Fayel (80559)
186. Montigny-les-Jongleurs (80563)
187. Montigny-sur-l'Hallue (80562)
188. Montonvillers (80565)
189. Morcourt (80569)
190. Morvillers-Saint-Saturnin (80573)
191. Mouflières (80575)
192. Moyencourt-lès-Poix (80577)
193. Namps-Maisnil (80582)
194. Nampty (80583)
195. Naours (80584)
196. Nesle-l'Hôpital (80586)
197. Neslette (80587)
198. Neuville-au-Bois (80591)
199. Neuville-Coppegueule (80592)
200. Neuvillette (80596)
201. Occoches (80602)
202. Ô-de-Selle (80485)
203. Offignies (80604)
204. Oisemont (80606)
205. Oissy (80607)
206. Oresmaux (80611)
207. Outrebois (80614)
208. Pernois (80619)
209. Picquigny (80622)
210. Pierregot (80624)
211. Pissy (80626)
212. Plachy-Buyon (80627)
213. Poix-de-Picardie (80630)
214. Pont-de-Metz (80632)
215. Pont-Noyelles (80634)
216. Poulainville (80639)
217. Prouville (80642)
218. Prouzel (80643)
219. Querrieu (80650)
220. Le Quesne (80651)
221. Quesnoy-sur-Airaines (80655)
222. Quevauvillers (80656)
223. Rainneville (80661)
224. Rambures (80663)
225. Remaisnil (80666)
226. Remiencourt (80668)
227. Revelles (80670)
228. Ribeaucourt (80671)
229. Ribemont-sur-Ancre (80672)
230. Riencourt (80673)
231. Rivery (80674)
232. Rubempré (80686)
233. Rumigny (80690)
234. Sailly-Laurette (80693)
235. Sailly-le-Sec (80694)
236. Sains-en-Amiénois (80696)
237. Saint-Acheul (80697)
238. Saint-Aubin-Montenoy (80698)
239. Saint-Aubin-Rivière (80699)
240. Sainte-Segrée (80719)
241. Saint-Fuscien (80702)
242. Saint-Germain-sur-Bresle (80703)
243. Saint-Gratien (80704)
244. Saint-Léger-lès-Domart (80706)
245. Saint-Léger-sur-Bresle (80707)
246. Saint-Maulvis (80709)
247. Saint-Ouen (80711)
248. Saint-Sauflieu (80717)
249. Saint-Sauveur (80718)
250. Saint-Vaast-en-Chaussée (80722)
251. Saisseval (80723)
252. Saleux (80724)
253. Salouël (80725)
254. Saulchoy-sous-Poix (80728)
255. Saveuse (80730)
256. Senarpont (80732)
257. Sentelie (80734)
258. Seux (80735)
259. Soues (80738)
260. Surcamps (80742)
261. Tailly (80744)
262. Talmas (80746)
263. Terramesnil (80749)
264. Thézy-Glimont (80752)
265. Thieulloy-l'Abbaye (80754)
266. Thieulloy-la-Ville (80755)
267. Thoix (80757)
268. Le Translay (80767)
269. Treux (80769)
270. Vadencourt (80773)
271. Vaire-sous-Corbie (80774)
272. Vauchelles-lès-Domart (80778)
273. Vaux-en-Amiénois (80782)
274. Vaux-sur-Somme (80784)
275. Vecquemont (80785)
276. Velennes (80786)
277. Vergies (80788)
278. Vers-sur-Selle (80791)
279. Vignacourt (80793)
280. La Vicogne (80792)
281. Ville-le-Marclet (80795)
282. Villeroy (80796)
283. Villers-Bocage (80798)
284. Villers-Bretonneux (80799)
285. Villers-Campsart (80800)
286. Vraignes-lès-Hornoy (80813)
287. Wargnies (80819)
288. Warloy-Baillon (80820)
289. Warlus (80821)
290. Woirel (80828)
291. Yzeux (80835)

== History ==
The arrondissement of Amiens was created in 1800. In January 2009 the canton of Oisemont passed from the arrondissement of Amiens to the arrondissement of Abbeville. At the January 2017 reorganisation of the arrondissements of Somme, it received 38 communes from the arrondissement of Abbeville and seven communes from the arrondissement of Péronne, and it lost two communes to the arrondissement of Abbeville, five communes to the arrondissement of Montdidier and 26 communes to the arrondissement of Péronne.

As a result of the reorganisation of the cantons of France which came into effect in 2015, the borders of the cantons are no longer related to the borders of the arrondissements. The cantons of the arrondissement of Amiens were, as of January 2015:

1. Acheux-en-Amiénois
2. Amiens-1 (Ouest)
3. Amiens-2 (Nord-Ouest)
4. Amiens-3 (Nord-Est)
5. Amiens-4 (Est)
6. Amiens-5 (Sud-Est)
7. Amiens-6 (Sud)
8. Amiens-7 (Sud-Ouest)
9. Amiens-8 (Nord)
10. Bernaville
11. Boves
12. Conty
13. Corbie
14. Domart-en-Ponthieu
15. Doullens
16. Hornoy-le-Bourg
17. Molliens-Dreuil
18. Picquigny
19. Poix-de-Picardie
20. Villers-Bocage
