= Communauté de communes du Bocage et de l'Hallue =

Coordinates: 49.9986°N 2.3174°E

le Bocage et l'Hallue
- Former communauté de communes
- Interactive map of le Bocage et l'Hallue
- Country: France
- Region: Hauts-de-France
- Department: Somme
- No. of communes: {{{nbcomm}}}
- Established: 1999
- Disbanded: 2017

The Communauté de communes du Bocage et de l'Hallue is a former communauté de communes in the Somme département and in the Picardie région of France. It was created in December 1999. It was merged into the new Communauté de communes du Territoire Nord Picardie in January 2017.

== Composition ==
This Communauté de communes comprised 26 communes:

1. Bavelincourt
2. Beaucourt-sur-l'Hallue
3. Béhencourt
4. Cardonnette
5. Coisy
6. Contay
7. Flesselles
8. Fréchencourt
9. La Vicogne
10. Mirvaux
11. Molliens-au-Bois
12. Montigny-sur-l'Hallue
13. Montonvillers
14. Naours
15. Pierregot
16. Pont-Noyelles
17. Querrieu
18. Rainneville
19. Rubempré
20. Saint-Gratien
21. Saint-Vaast-en-Chaussée
22. Talmas
23. Vadencourt
24. Vaux-en-Amiénois
25. Villers-Bocage
26. Wargnies

== See also ==
- Communes of the Somme department
