= Canton of Villers-Bocage, Somme =

Coordinates: 49°58′54″N 2°22′33″E

Villers-Bocage
- Former canton
- Interactive map of Villers-Bocage
- Country: France
- Region: Hauts-de-France
- Department: Somme
- No. of communes: {{{nbcomm}}}
- Disbanded: 2015
- Area: 190.28 km^{2} (73.47 sq mi)
- Population (2012): 12,696
  - Density: 66.723/km^{2} (172.81/sq mi)

The Canton of Villers-Bocage is a former canton situated in the department of the Somme and in the Picardie region of northern France. It was disbanded following the French canton reorganisation which came into effect in March 2015. It had 12,696 inhabitants (2012).

== Geography ==
The canton is organised around the commune of Villers-Bocage in the arrondissement of Amiens. The altitude varies from 20 m (Saint-Vaast-en-Chaussée) to 154 m (Talmas) for an average of 92 m.

The canton comprised 24 communes:

- Bavelincourt
- Beaucourt-sur-l'Hallue
- Béhencourt
- Bertangles
- Cardonnette
- Coisy
- Contay
- Flesselles
- Fréchencourt
- Mirvaux
- Molliens-au-Bois
- Montigny-sur-l'Hallue
- Montonvillers
- Pierregot
- Pont-Noyelles
- Querrieu
- Rainneville
- Rubempré
- Saint-Gratien
- Saint-Vaast-en-Chaussée
- Talmas
- Vadencourt
- Vaux-en-Amiénois
- Villers-Bocage

== Population ==
Population Growth
1962	1968	1975	1982	1990	1999
6139	6742	7889	9942	11973	12386
Census count starting from 1962 : Population without double counting

== See also ==
- Arrondissements of the Somme department
- Cantons of the Somme department
- Communes of the Somme department
