= Villers-Bocage =

Villers-Bocage may refer to the following communes in France:

- Villers-Bocage, Calvados
  - Battle of Villers-Bocage, 1944
- Villers-Bocage, Somme
