= Canton of Amiens-2 =

Coordinates: 49°55′N 2°18′E

Amiens-2
- Canton
- Interactive map of Amiens-2
- Country: France
- Region: Hauts-de-France
- Department: Somme
- No. of communes: {{{nbcomm}}}
- Population (2023): 23,741
- INSEE code: 80 07

The Canton of Amiens-2 is a canton situated in the department of the Somme in the northern French region of Hauts-de-France.

== Composition ==
At the French canton reorganisation which came into effect in March 2015, the canton was expanded from 3 to 11 communes:

- Allonville
- Amiens (northeastern part)
- Bertangles
- Cardonnette
- Coisy
- Montonvillers
- Poulainville
- Querrieu
- Rainneville
- Saint-Gratien
- Villers-Bocage

== See also ==
- Arrondissements of the Somme department
- Cantons of the Somme department
- Communes of the Somme department
