= Bertangles =

- Commune
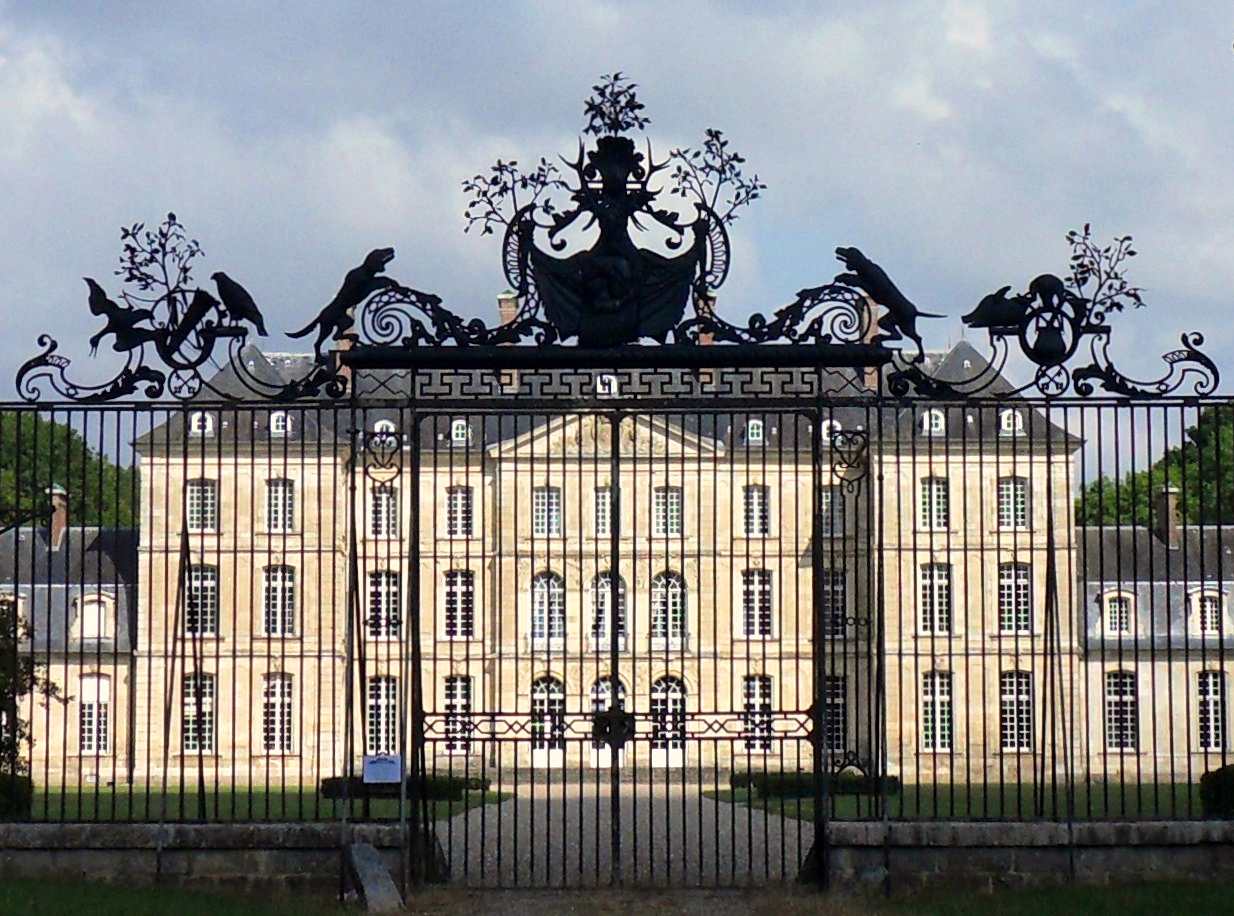
- The chateau in Bertangles
- Location of Bertangles
- Location within France Location within Hauts-de-France
- Coordinates: 49°58′15″N 2°18′02″E
- Country: France
- Region: Hauts-de-France
- Department: Somme
- Arrondissement: Amiens
- Canton: Amiens-2
- Intercommunality: Amiens Métropole

Government
  - Mayor (2020–2026): Joseph Debart
- Area^{1}: 8.57 km^{2} (3.31 sq mi)
- Elevation: 59 m (194 ft)
- Highest elevation: 131 m (430 ft)
- Lowest elevation: 51 m (167 ft)
- Population (2023): 815
  - Density: 95.1/km^{2} (246/sq mi)
- Time zone: UTC+01:00 (CET)
  - Summer (DST): UTC+02:00 (CEST)
- INSEE/Postal code: 80092 /80260
- ^{1} French Land Register data, which excludes lakes, ponds, glaciers > 1 km^{2} (0.386 sq mi or 247 acres) and river estuaries.

Bertangles (French pronunciation: [bɛʁtɑ̃ɡl]); Picard: Bèrtangue) is a commune in the Somme department in Hauts-de-France in northern France.

== Geography ==
Bertangles is situated on the D97 road, just off the N25, 3 miles (5 km) north of Amiens. A farming area with extensive woodland and a grand chateau.

== Population ==
Historical population
Year	Pop.	±% p.a.
1968	287	—
1975	387	+4.36%
1982	646	+7.59%
1990	700	+1.01%
1999	654	−0.75%
2007	604	−0.99%
2012	583	−0.71%
2017	627	+1.47%
2023	815	+4.47%
Source: INSEE

== Places of interest ==
- The 18th-century château, constructed by Louis-Joseph Clermont-Tonnerre from 1730 to 1734, replacing the medieval structure, itself rebuilt in the 16th century, after being burned by the Spaniards in 1597. An old gateway is all that remains of the older building, which gives access to the farm, to the west. In August 1930, a fire destroyed the interior of the château, particularly the woodwork. All was remade in the same style in subsequent years. The stairway and ramp of wrought iron have also been restored.

The chateau was also used as Headquarters by the Australian Corps prior to the Battle of Amiens in August 1918

== Personalities ==
- Rittmeister Manfred Freiherr von Richthofen, the Red Baron, was buried with military honours by the Australian Flying Corps in the cemetery some distance from the village on 22 April 1918, but exhumed after the end of World War I and reburied first in the German military cemetery of Fricourt (Somme), then by his brother in Berlin. After the Second World War his remains were transferred to Wiesbaden (in 1975).

== See also ==
- Communes of the Somme department

== Bibliography ==
- « Canton of Villers-Bocage - Châteaux et fermes - N° 182 - Coll. Itinéraires du patrimoine » - Textes de Judith Förstel - 1999 - ISBN 2-906340-40-5
- « Dictionnaire historique et archéologique de Picardie - Arrondissement of Amiens - Tome III » - E. Héren et L. Ledieu - 1919
- « Dictionnaire des châteaux de France : Artois, Flandre, Hainaut, Picardie » - J. Thiebaut - 1978
- « Églises, châteaux, beffrois et hôtels-de-ville les plus remarquables de la Picardie et de l'Artois » - A. Goze - 1849
- « La décoration sculptée des façades du château de Bertangles » - François de Clermont-Tonnerre - dans Bulletin de la Société des Antiquaires de Picardie - Tome 76 - 1976
- « Un grand artiste du fer : Vivarais » - J. Foucart-Borville - dans Bulletin de la Société des Antiquaires de Picardie - 3^{e} trim. 1980 (à propos de l'histoire de la grille d'honneur)
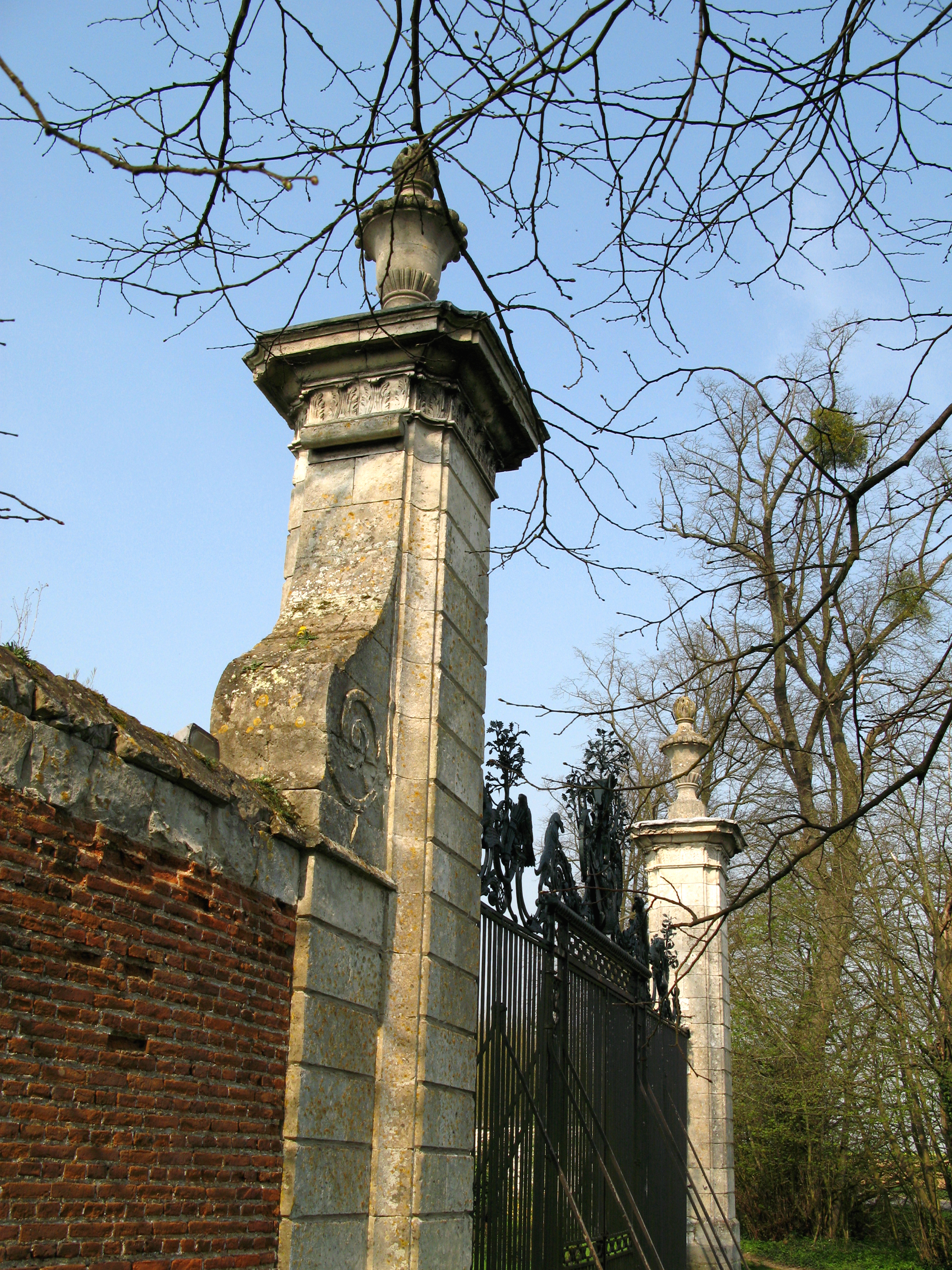
Pillars on the main gate

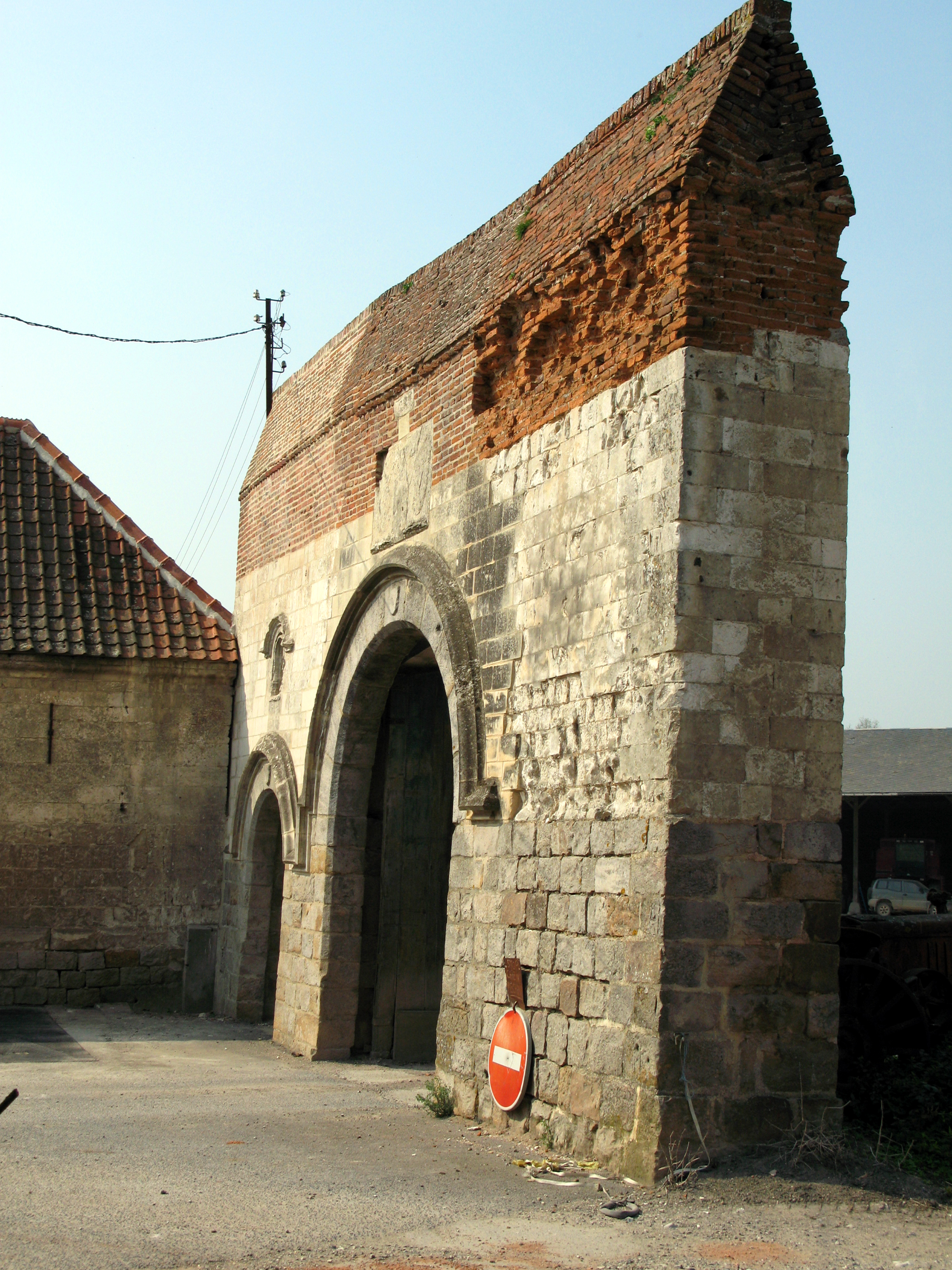
The gate to the medieval château

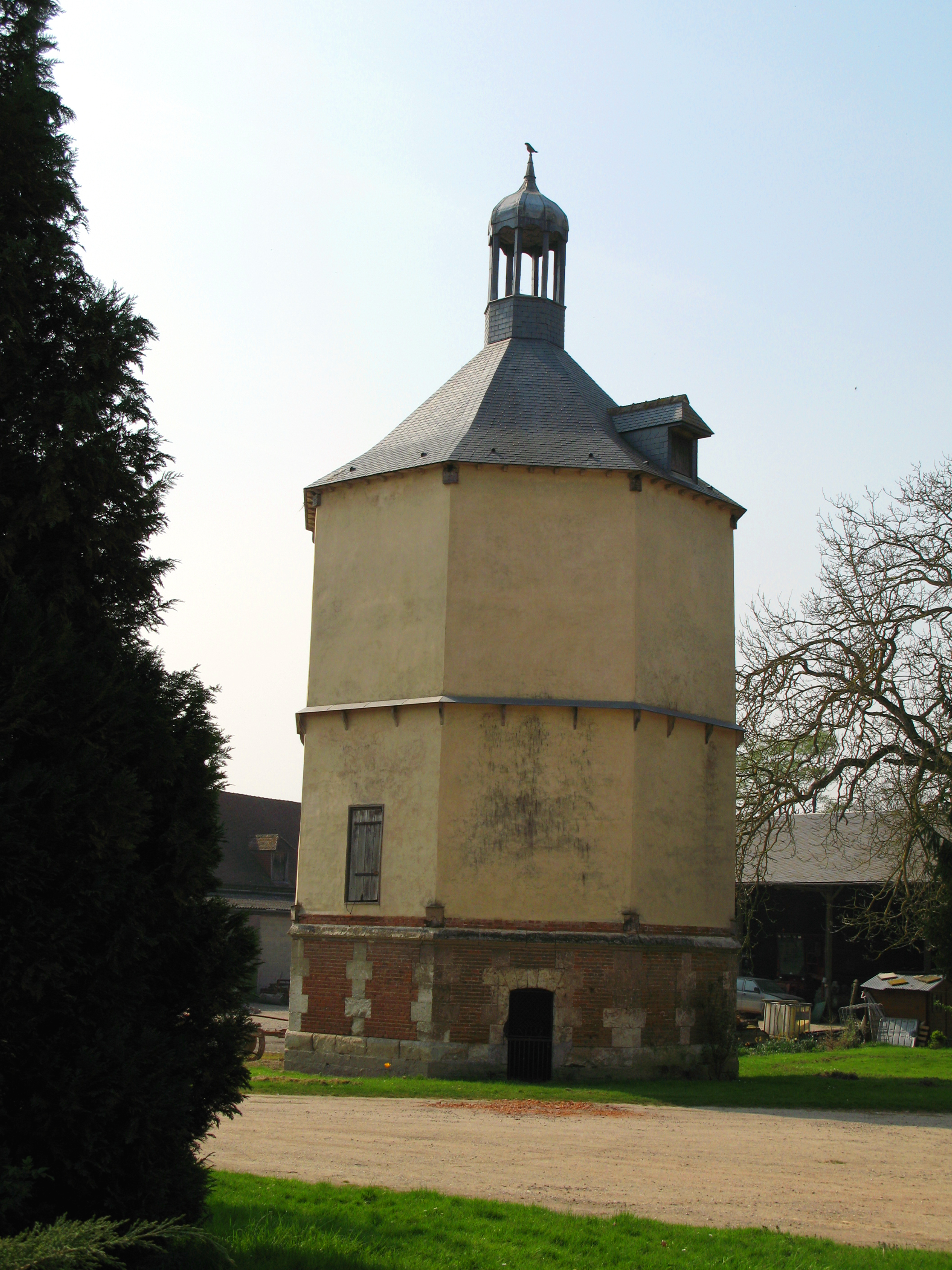
The Dovecote

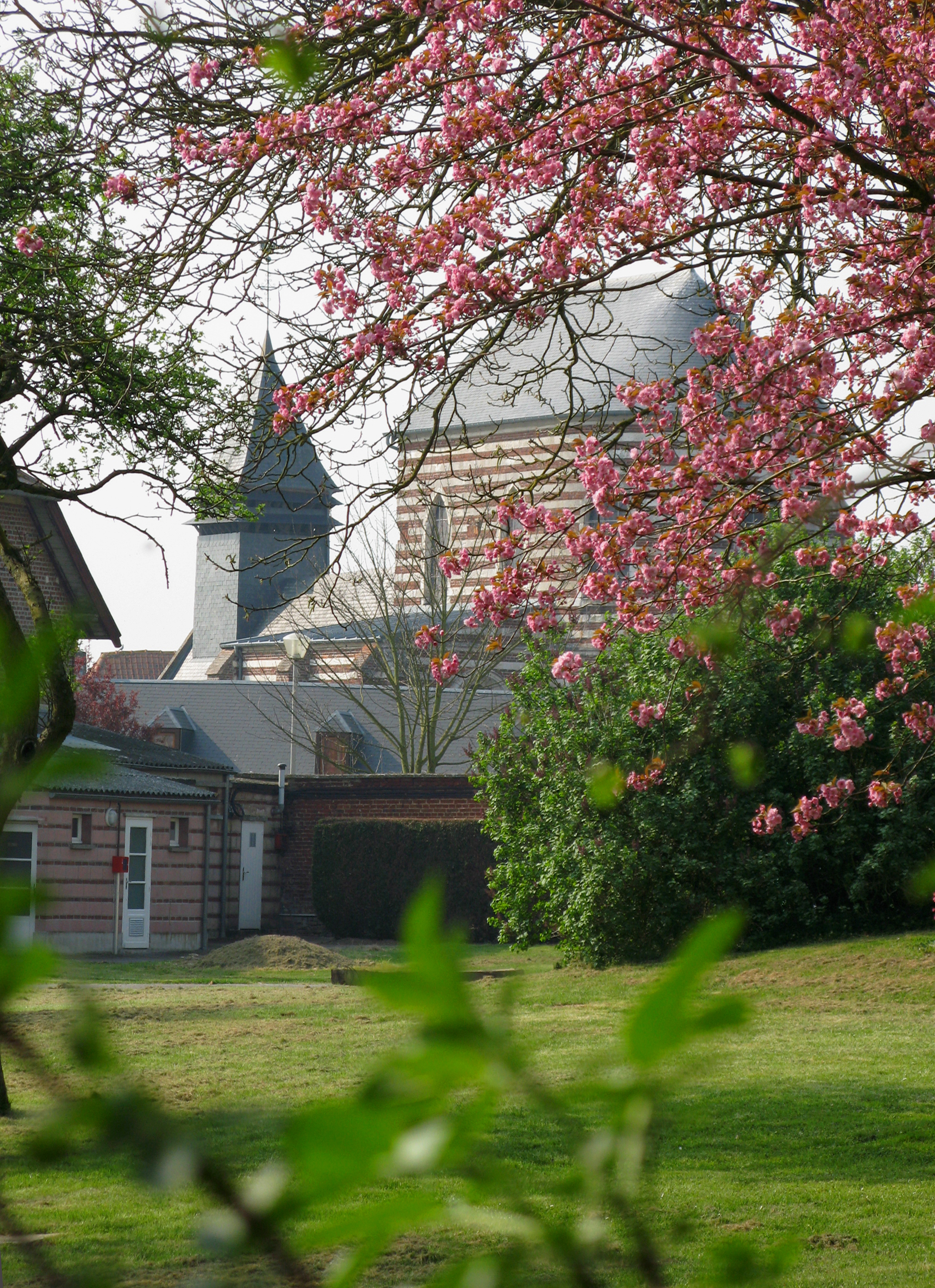
The church
