= La Vicogne =

- Commune
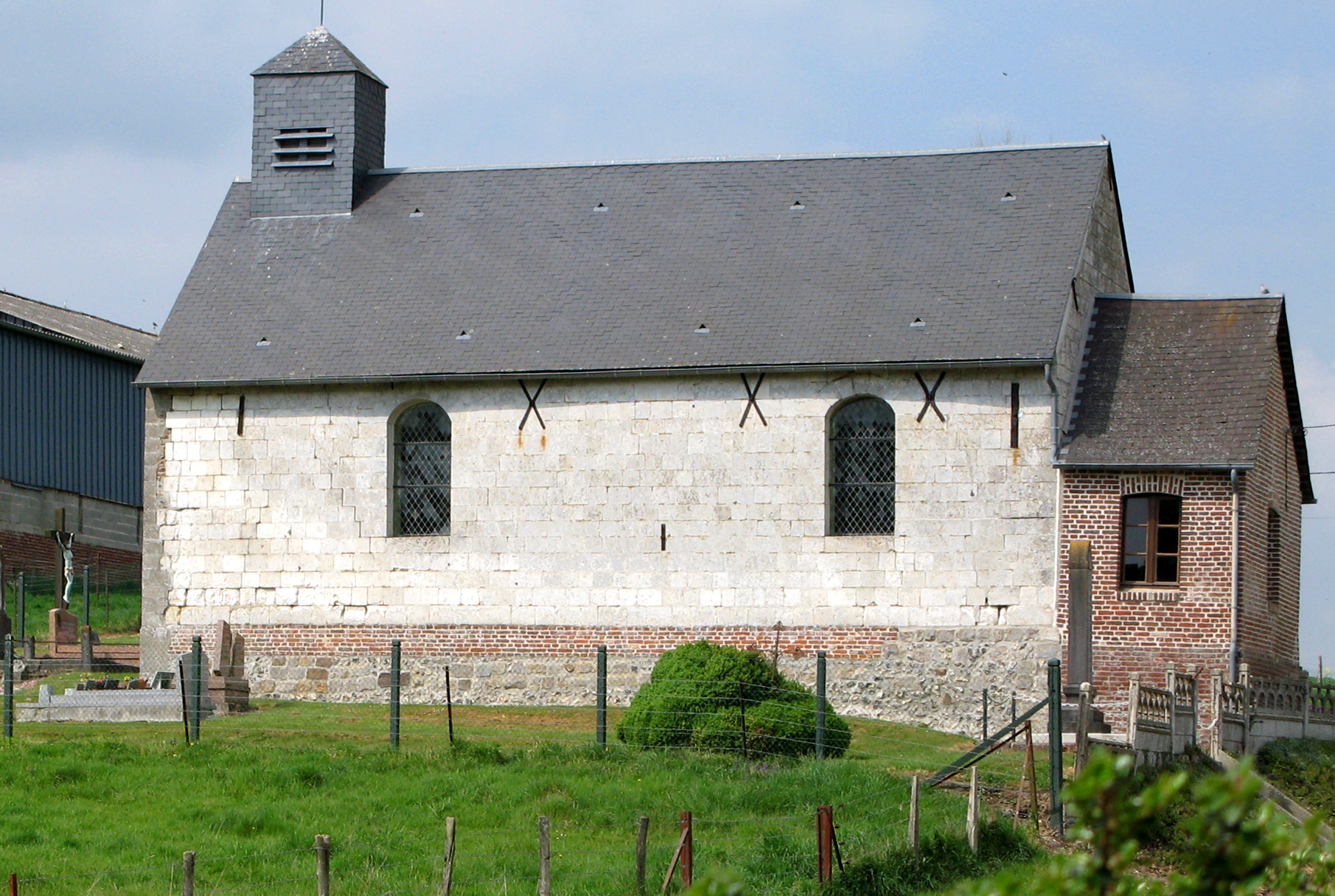
- The church in La Vicogne

- Coat of arms
- Location of La Vicogne
- Location within France Location within Hauts-de-France
- Coordinates: 50°03′13″N 2°19′21″E
- Country: France
- Region: Hauts-de-France
- Department: Somme
- Arrondissement: Amiens
- Canton: Corbie
- Intercommunality: CC Territoire Nord Picardie

Government
  - Mayor (2020–2026): David Gallet
- Area^{1}: 4.84 km^{2} (1.87 sq mi)
- Elevation: 140 m (460 ft)
- Highest elevation: 163 m (535 ft)
- Lowest elevation: 100 m (330 ft)
- Population (2023): 241
  - Density: 49.8/km^{2} (129/sq mi)
- Time zone: UTC+01:00 (CET)
  - Summer (DST): UTC+02:00 (CEST)
- INSEE/Postal code: 80792 /80260
- ^{1} French Land Register data, which excludes lakes, ponds, glaciers > 1 km^{2} (0.386 sq mi or 247 acres) and river estuaries.

La Vicogne (French pronunciation: [la vikɔɲ]; Picard: L'Vicongne) is a commune in the Somme department in Hauts-de-France in northern France.

== Geography ==
La Vicogne is situated 12 miles (19 km) north of Amiens, on the N25 road.

== Population ==
Historical population
Year	Pop.	±% p.a.
1968	86	—
1975	100	+2.18%
1982	151	+6.06%
1990	168	+1.34%
1999	195	+1.67%
2007	248	+3.05%
2012	257	+0.72%
2017	252	−0.39%
2023	241	−0.74%
Source: INSEE

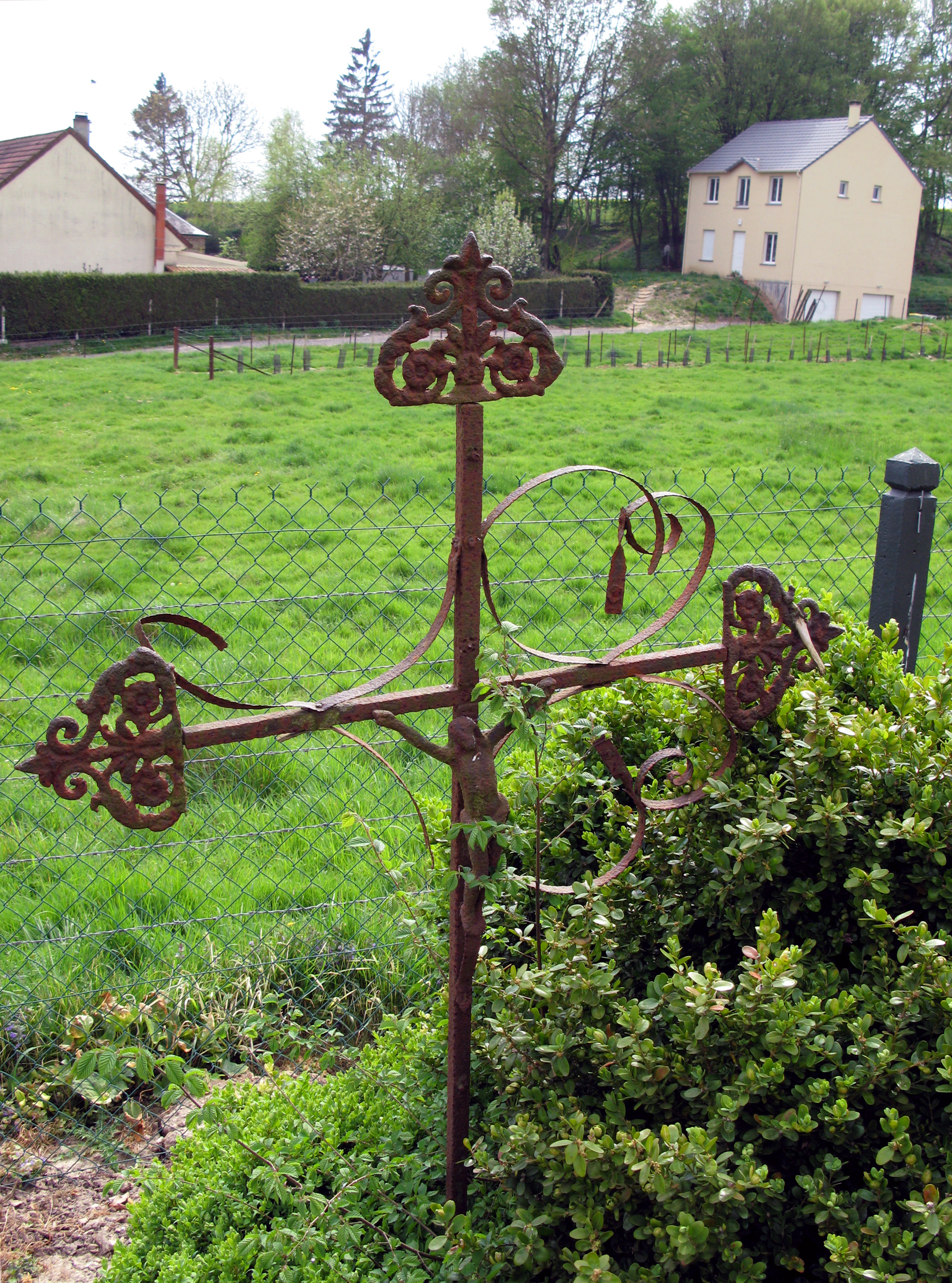
A wrought-iron cross in the cemetery

== See also ==
- Communes of the Somme department
