= Wargnies =

- Commune
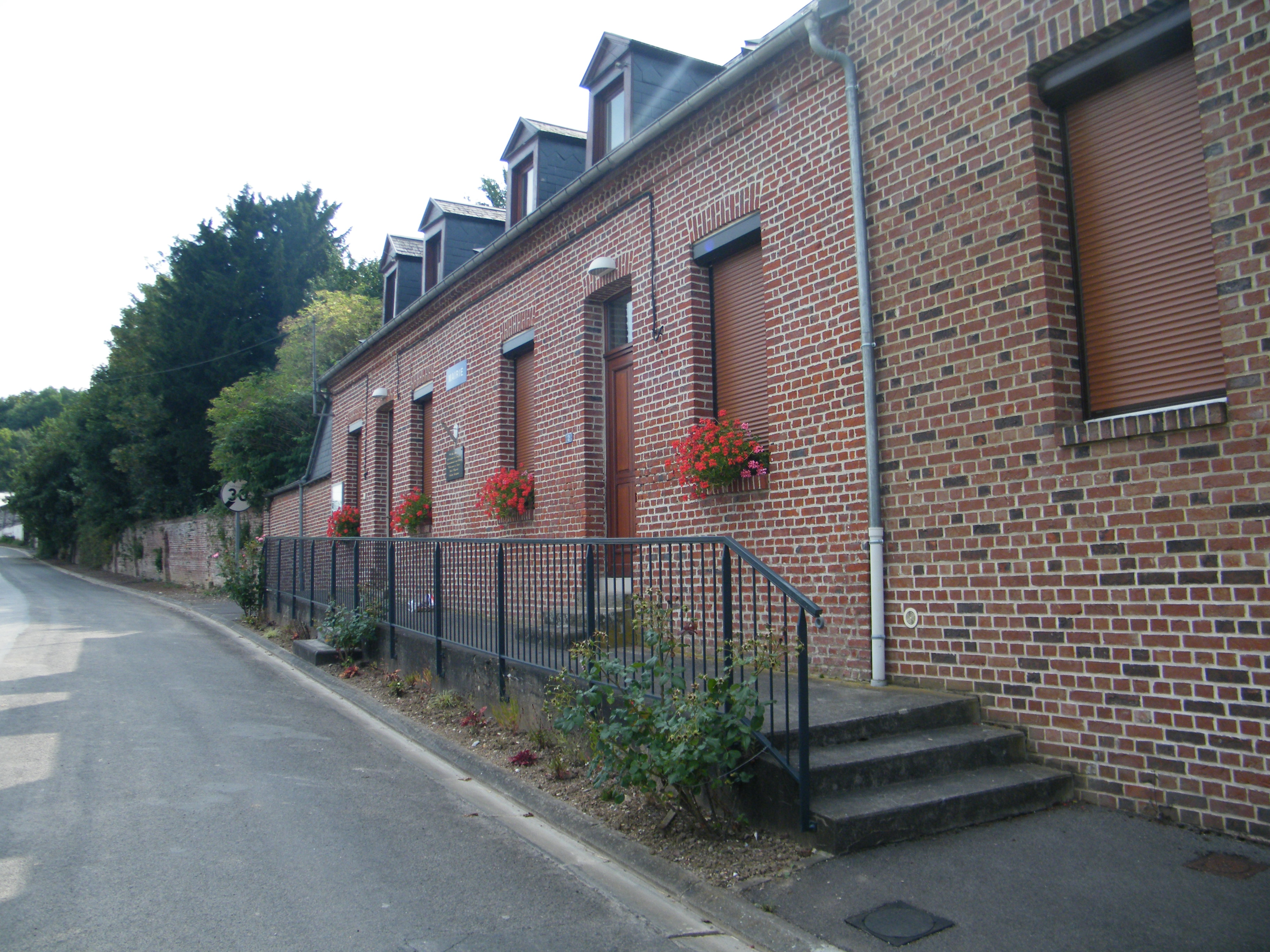
- The town hall in Wargnies
- Location of Wargnies
- Location within France Location within Hauts-de-France
- Coordinates: 50°02′07″N 2°15′24″E
- Country: France
- Region: Hauts-de-France
- Department: Somme
- Arrondissement: Amiens
- Canton: Corbie
- Intercommunality: Territoire Nord Picardie

Government
  - Mayor (2020–2026): Claude Dimoff
- Area^{1}: 2.82 km^{2} (1.09 sq mi)
- Elevation: 120 m (390 ft)
- Highest elevation: 146 m (479 ft)
- Lowest elevation: 55 m (180 ft)
- Population (2023): 78
  - Density: 28/km^{2} (72/sq mi)
- Time zone: UTC+01:00 (CET)
  - Summer (DST): UTC+02:00 (CEST)
- INSEE/Postal code: 80819 /80670
- ^{1} French Land Register data, which excludes lakes, ponds, glaciers > 1 km^{2} (0.386 sq mi or 247 acres) and river estuaries.

Wargnies (French pronunciation: [waʁɲi]) is a commune in the Somme department in Hauts-de-France in northern France.

== Geography ==
Wargnies is situated 10 miles(16 km) north of Amiens, on the D60 road.

== Population ==
Historical population
Year	Pop.	±% p.a.
1968	56	—
1975	61	+1.23%
1982	73	+2.60%
1990	84	+1.77%
1999	88	+0.52%
2007	87	−0.14%
2012	93	+1.34%
2017	89	−0.88%
2023	78	−2.17%
Source: INSEE

== See also ==
- Communes of the Somme department
