= Rainneville =

- Commune
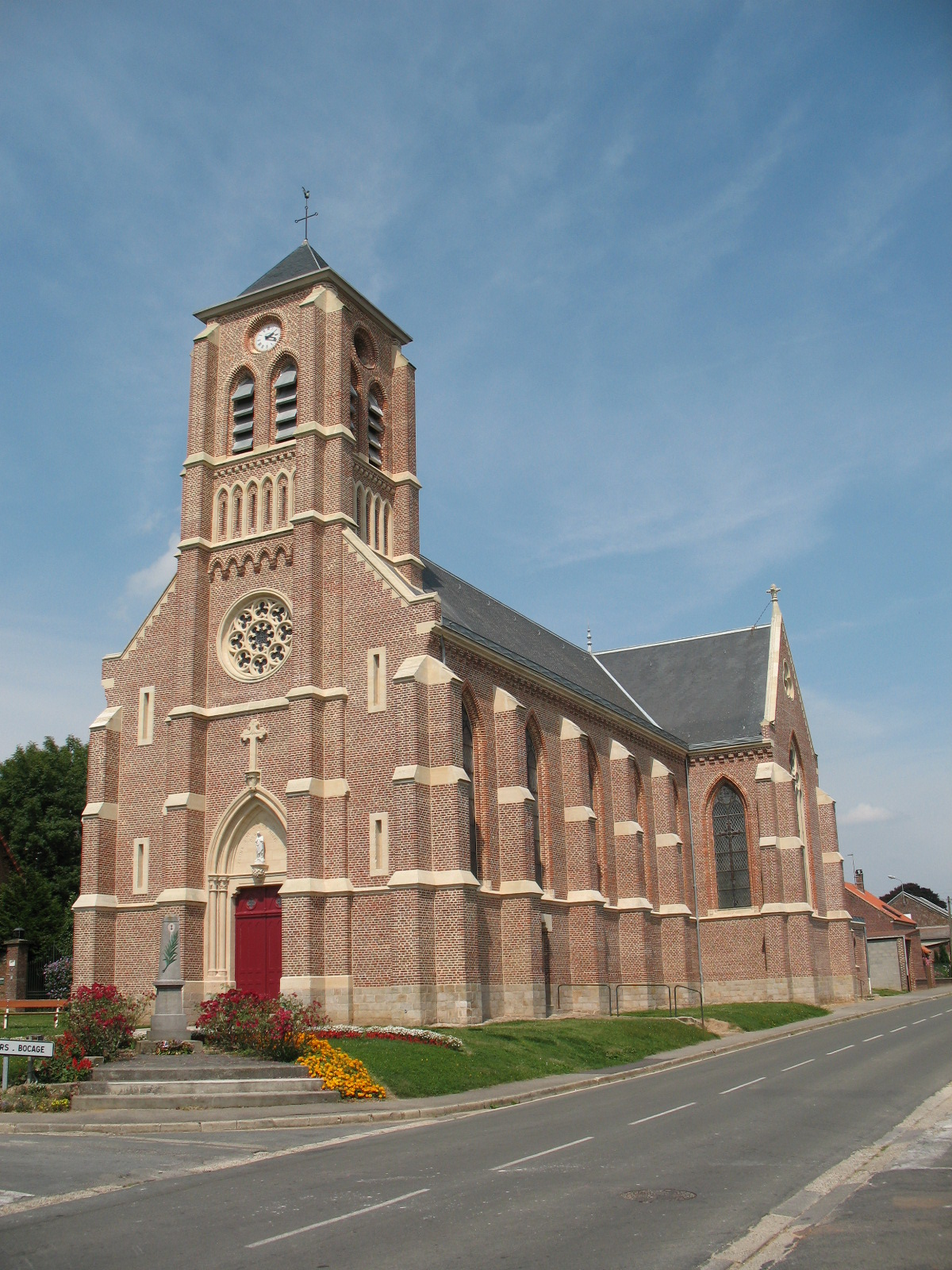
- The church in Rainneville
- Location of Rainneville
- Location within France Location within Hauts-de-France
- Coordinates: 49°58′26″N 2°21′19″E
- Country: France
- Region: Hauts-de-France
- Department: Somme
- Arrondissement: Amiens
- Canton: Amiens-2
- Intercommunality: CC Territoire Nord Picardie

Government
  - Mayor (2020–2026): Jacques Masset
- Area^{1}: 7.11 km^{2} (2.75 sq mi)
- Elevation: 150 m (490 ft)
- Highest elevation: 131 m (430 ft)
- Lowest elevation: 79 m (259 ft)
- Population (2023): 1,123
  - Density: 158/km^{2} (409/sq mi)
- Time zone: UTC+01:00 (CET)
  - Summer (DST): UTC+02:00 (CEST)
- INSEE/Postal code: 80661 /80260
- ^{1} French Land Register data, which excludes lakes, ponds, glaciers > 1 km^{2} (0.386 sq mi or 247 acres) and river estuaries.

Rainneville (French pronunciation: [ʁɛnvil]) is a commune in the Somme department of Hauts-de-France in northern France.

== Geography ==
Rainneville is situated on the D11 road, some 7 miles (11 km) north of Amiens.

== Population ==
Historical population
| Year | Pop. | ±% p.a. |
|---|---|---|
| 1968 | 443 | — |
| 1975 | 516 | +2.20% |
| 1982 | 738 | +5.24% |
| 1990 | 784 | +0.76% |
| 1999 | 761 | −0.33% |
| 2007 | 759 | −0.03% |
| 2012 | 836 | +1.95% |
| 2017 | 997 | +3.59% |
| 2023 | 1,123 | +2.00% |
Source: INSEE

== See also ==
- Communes of the Somme department
