= Vaux-en-Amiénois =

- Commune
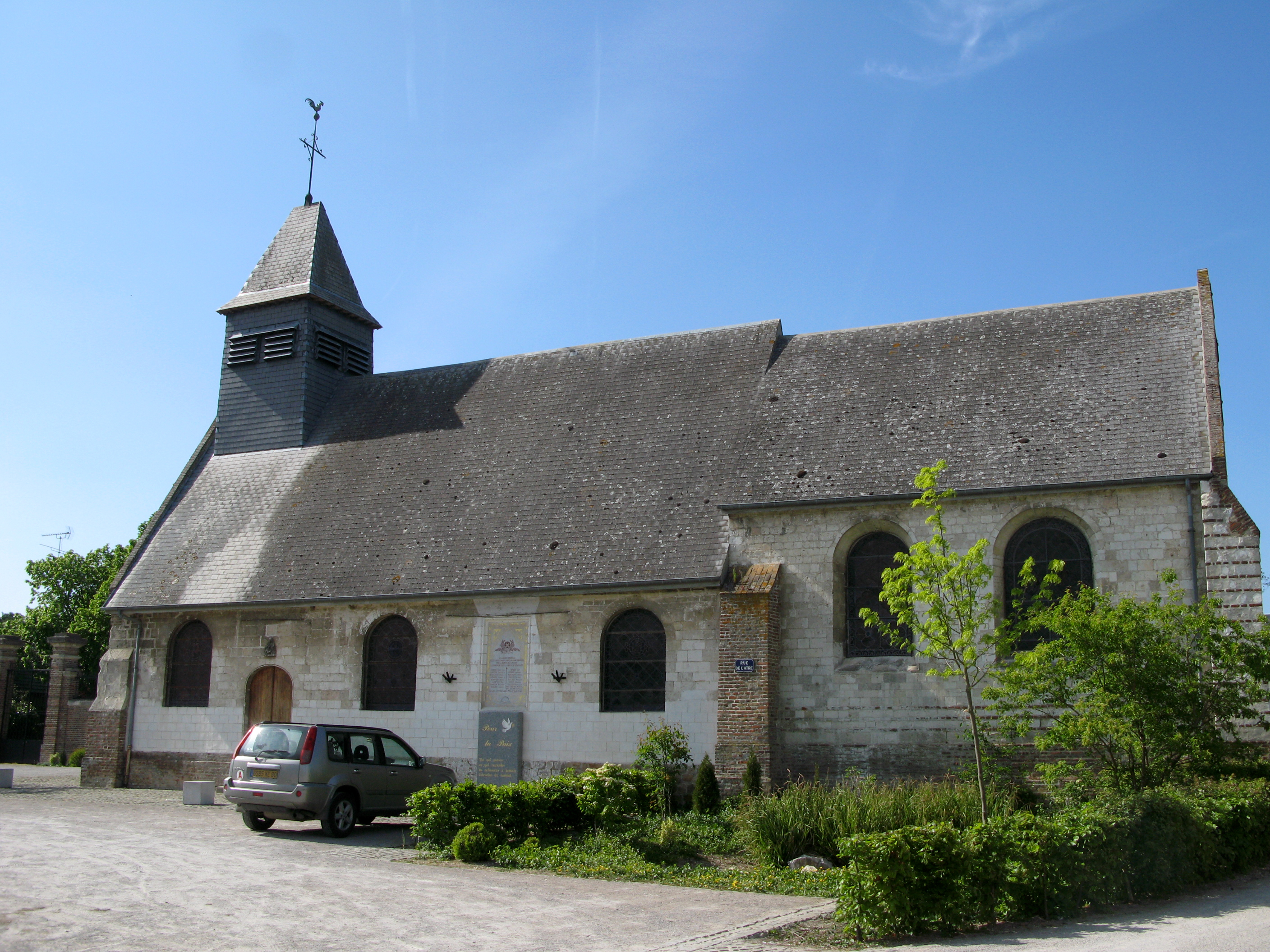
- The church in Vaux-en-Amiénois

- Coat of arms
- Location of Vaux-en-Amiénois
- Location within France Location within Hauts-de-France
- Coordinates: 49°57′47″N 2°14′57″E
- Country: France
- Region: Hauts-de-France
- Department: Somme
- Arrondissement: Amiens
- Canton: Flixecourt
- Intercommunality: CA Amiens Métropole

Government
  - Mayor (2020–2026): Daniel Leleu
- Area^{1}: 11.18 km^{2} (4.32 sq mi)
- Elevation: 40 m (130 ft)
- Highest elevation: 104 m (341 ft)
- Lowest elevation: 34 m (112 ft)
- Population (2023): 444
  - Density: 39.7/km^{2} (103/sq mi)
- Time zone: UTC+01:00 (CET)
  - Summer (DST): UTC+02:00 (CEST)
- INSEE/Postal code: 80782 /80260
- ^{1} French Land Register data, which excludes lakes, ponds, glaciers > 1 km^{2} (0.386 sq mi or 247 acres) and river estuaries.

Vaux-en-Amiénois (French pronunciation: [vo ɑ̃.n‿amjenwa], lit. 'Vaux in Amiénois'; Picard: Veux-in-Anmiénoé) is a commune in the Somme department in Hauts-de-France in northern France.

== Geography ==
The commune is situated 8 kilometres (5 mi) northwest of Amiens, on the D97e road

== Population ==
Historical population
Year	Pop.	±% p.a.
1968	309	—
1975	322	+0.59%
1982	401	+3.18%
1990	392	−0.28%
1999	389	−0.09%
2007	437	+1.47%
2012	424	−0.60%
2017	406	−0.86%
2023	444	+1.50%
Source: INSEE

== See also ==
- Communes of the Somme department
