= Vadencourt, Somme =

Vadencourt
- Commune
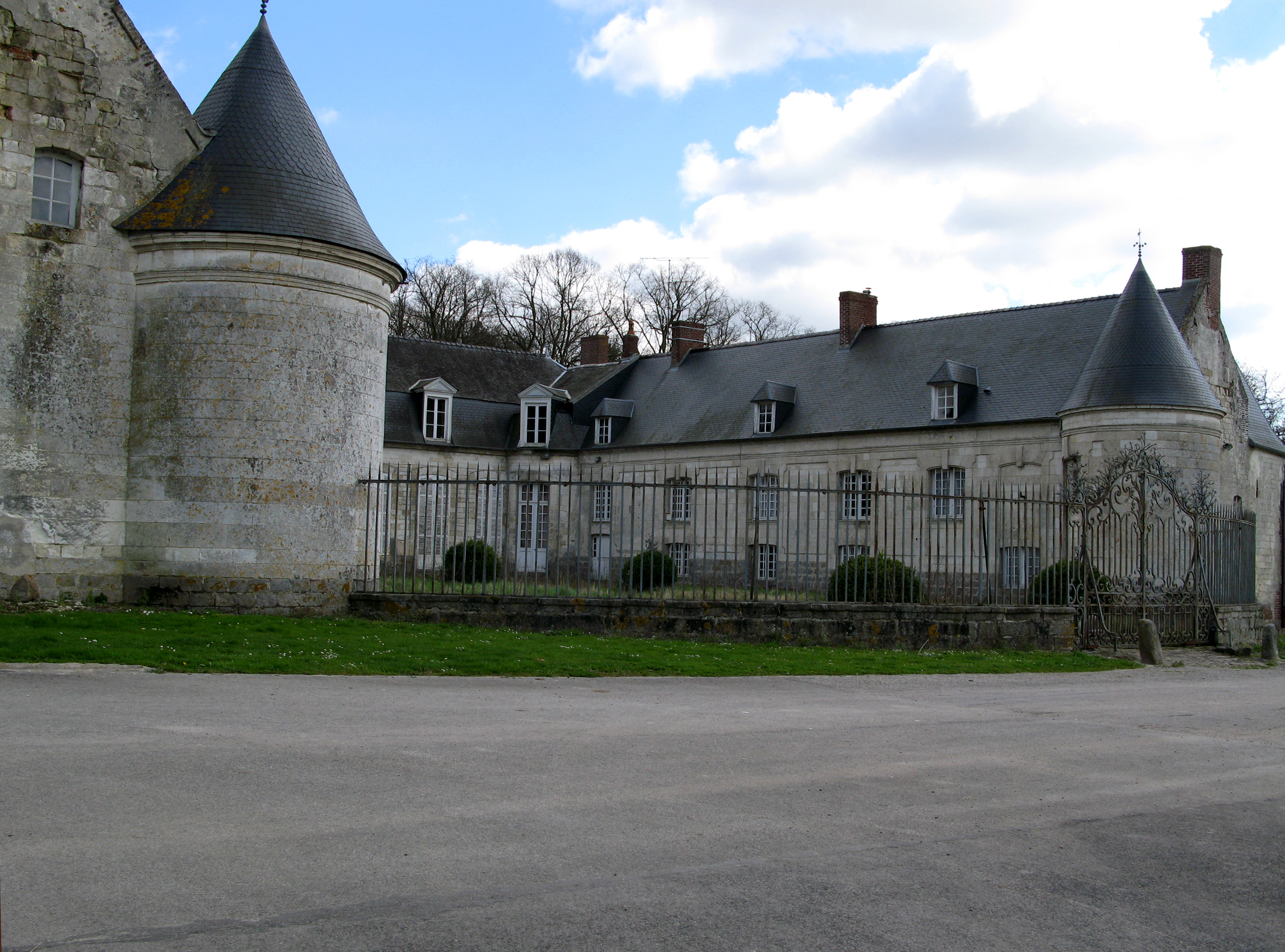
- Chateau of Vadencourt
- Location of Vadencourt
- Location within France Location within Hauts-de-France
- Coordinates: 50°00′28″N 2°29′25″E
- Country: France
- Region: Hauts-de-France
- Department: Somme
- Arrondissement: Amiens
- Canton: Corbie
- Intercommunality: CC Territoire Nord Picardie

Government
  - Mayor (2020–2026): Christian Bocquet
- Area^{1}: 4.92 km^{2} (1.90 sq mi)
- Elevation: 65 m (213 ft)
- Highest elevation: 120 m (390 ft)
- Lowest elevation: 53 m (174 ft)
- Population (2023): 98
  - Density: 20/km^{2} (52/sq mi)
- Time zone: UTC+01:00 (CET)
  - Summer (DST): UTC+02:00 (CEST)
- INSEE/Postal code: 80773 /80560
- ^{1} French Land Register data, which excludes lakes, ponds, glaciers > 1 km^{2} (0.386 sq mi or 247 acres) and river estuaries.

Vadencourt (French pronunciation: [vadɑ̃kuʁ]) is a commune in the Somme department in Hauts-de-France in northern France.

== Geography ==
Vadencourt is situated 10 miles (16 km) northeast of Amiens, on the D919 road.

== Population ==
Historical population
Year	Pop.	±% p.a.
1968	80	—
1975	73	−1.30%
1982	74	+0.19%
1990	93	+2.90%
1999	104	+1.25%
2007	101	−0.37%
2012	96	−1.01%
2017	100	+0.82%
2023	98	−0.34%
Source: INSEE

== Places of interest ==
- Château: Both wings of the building are flanked with a round tower emphasizing the impression of fortification, while allowing controlled access to the semicircular inner courtyard. The good state of repair of the roof contrasts with the state of neglect observed in the courtyard, whose cobblestones are beginning to be invaded by high grass.
- The church

== See also ==
- Communes of the Somme department
