= Beaucourt-sur-l'Hallue =

- Commune
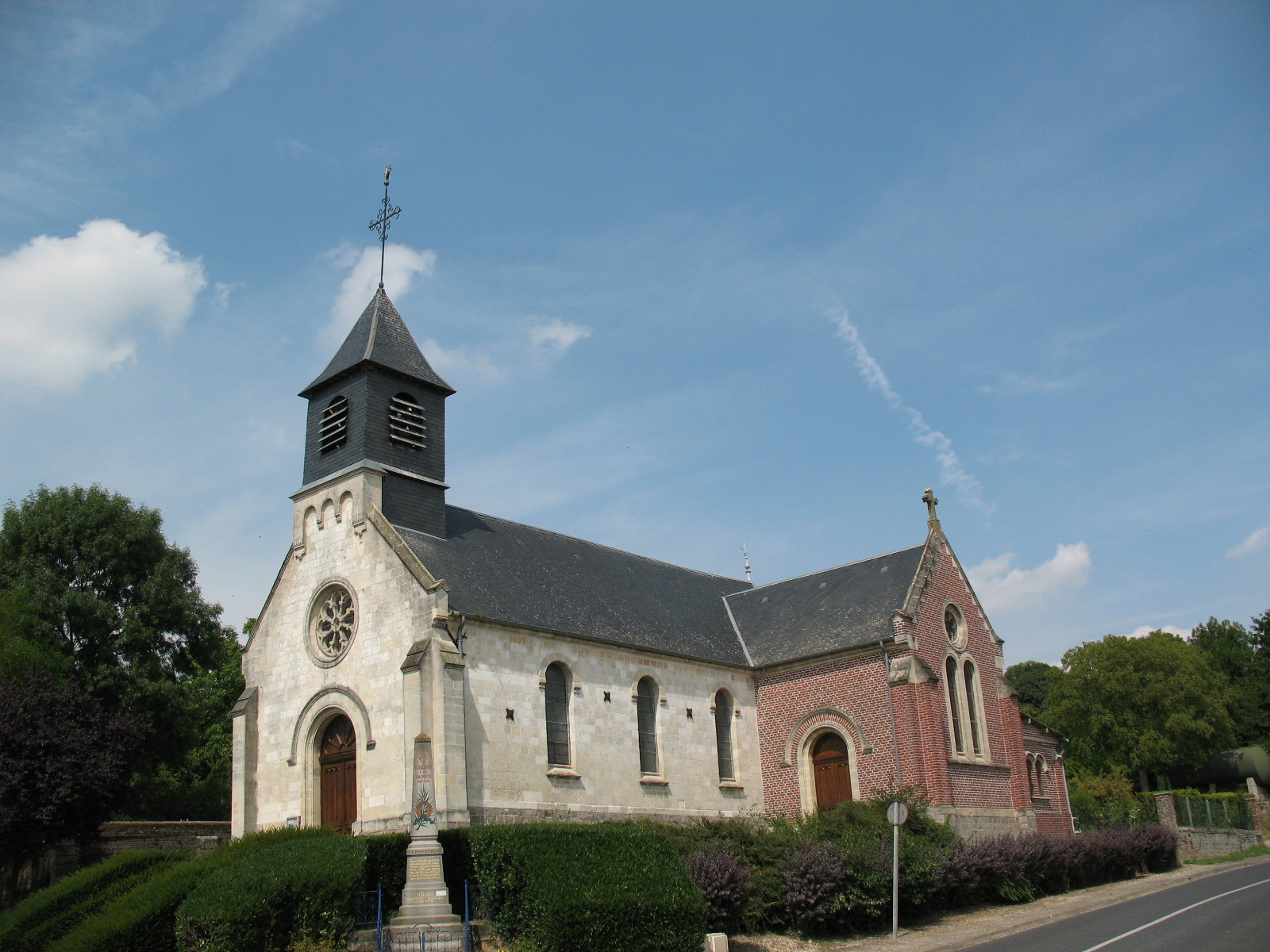
- The church in Beaucourt-sur-l'Hallue

- Coat of arms
- Location of Beaucourt-sur-l'Hallue
- Location within France Location within Hauts-de-France
- Coordinates: 49°59′16″N 2°26′44″E
- Country: France
- Region: Hauts-de-France
- Department: Somme
- Arrondissement: Amiens
- Canton: Corbie
- Intercommunality: CC Territoire Nord Picardie

Government
  - Mayor (2020–2026): Annie Marchand
- Area^{1}: 5.47 km^{2} (2.11 sq mi)
- Elevation: 51 m (167 ft)
- Highest elevation: 132 m (433 ft)
- Lowest elevation: 43 m (141 ft)
- Population (2023): 278
  - Density: 50.8/km^{2} (132/sq mi)
- Time zone: UTC+01:00 (CET)
  - Summer (DST): UTC+02:00 (CEST)
- INSEE/Postal code: 80066 /80260
- ^{1} French Land Register data, which excludes lakes, ponds, glaciers > 1 km^{2} (0.386 sq mi or 247 acres) and river estuaries.

Beaucourt-sur-l'Hallue (French pronunciation: [bokuʁ syʁ laly]; Picard: Bieucourt-su-l'Hallu) is a commune in the Somme department in Hauts-de-France in northern France.

== Geography ==
This commune is situated 9 miles (14 km) northeast of Amiens on the D919 and D115 junction.

== Population ==
Historical population
| Year | Pop. | ±% p.a. |
|---|---|---|
| 1968 | 208 | — |
| 1975 | 225 | +1.13% |
| 1982 | 214 | −0.71% |
| 1990 | 235 | +1.18% |
| 1999 | 226 | −0.43% |
| 2007 | 232 | +0.33% |
| 2012 | 259 | +2.23% |
| 2017 | 298 | +2.85% |
| 2023 | 278 | −1.15% |
Source: INSEE

== See also ==
- Communes of the Somme department
