= Rubempré =

- Commune
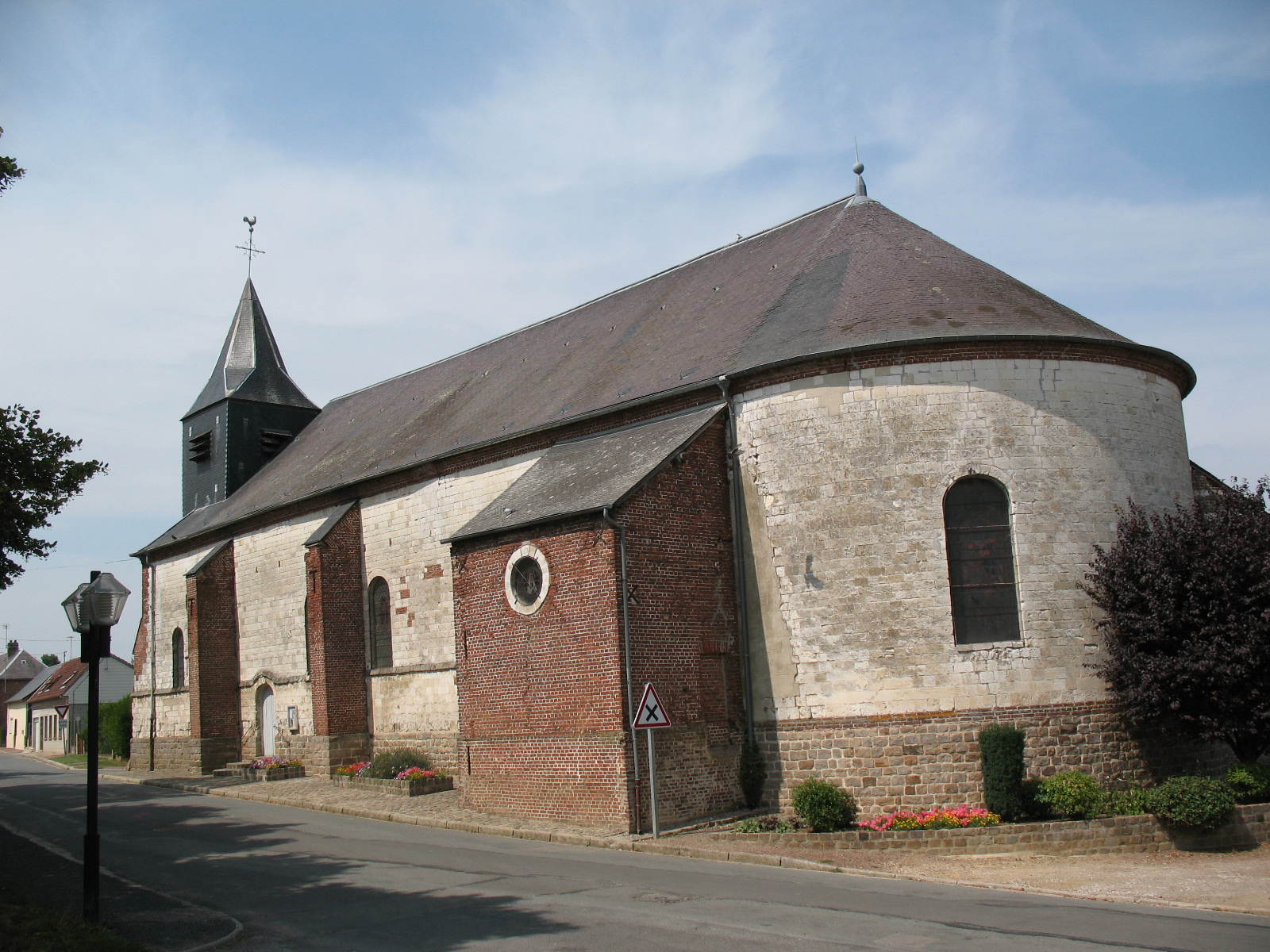
- The church in Rubempré

- Coat of arms
- Location of Rubempré
- Location within France Location within Hauts-de-France
- Coordinates: 50°01′11″N 2°23′12″E
- Country: France
- Region: Hauts-de-France
- Department: Somme
- Arrondissement: Amiens
- Canton: Corbie
- Intercommunality: CC Territoire Nord Picardie

Government
  - Mayor (2020–2026): Anne Loire
- Area^{1}: 10.08 km^{2} (3.89 sq mi)
- Elevation: 131 m (430 ft)
- Highest elevation: 147 m (482 ft)
- Lowest elevation: 89 m (292 ft)
- Population (2023): 720
  - Density: 71/km^{2} (180/sq mi)
- Time zone: UTC+01:00 (CET)
  - Summer (DST): UTC+02:00 (CEST)
- INSEE/Postal code: 80686 /80260
- ^{1} French Land Register data, which excludes lakes, ponds, glaciers > 1 km^{2} (0.386 sq mi or 247 acres) and river estuaries.

Rubempré (French pronunciation: [ʁybɑ̃pʁe]; Picard: Rubimpré) is a commune in the Somme department in Hauts-de-France in northern France.

== Geography ==
The commune is situated some 9 miles (14 km) north of Amiens, at the junction of the D11 and D113 roads.

== Population ==
Historical population
| Year | Pop. | ±% p.a. |
|---|---|---|
| 1968 | 421 | — |
| 1975 | 433 | +0.40% |
| 1982 | 486 | +1.66% |
| 1990 | 634 | +3.38% |
| 1999 | 675 | +0.70% |
| 2007 | 774 | +1.73% |
| 2012 | 720 | −1.44% |
| 2017 | 726 | +0.17% |
| 2023 | 720 | −0.14% |
Source: INSEE

== See also ==
- Lords of Rubempré
- Communes of the Somme department
