= Mirvaux =

- Commune
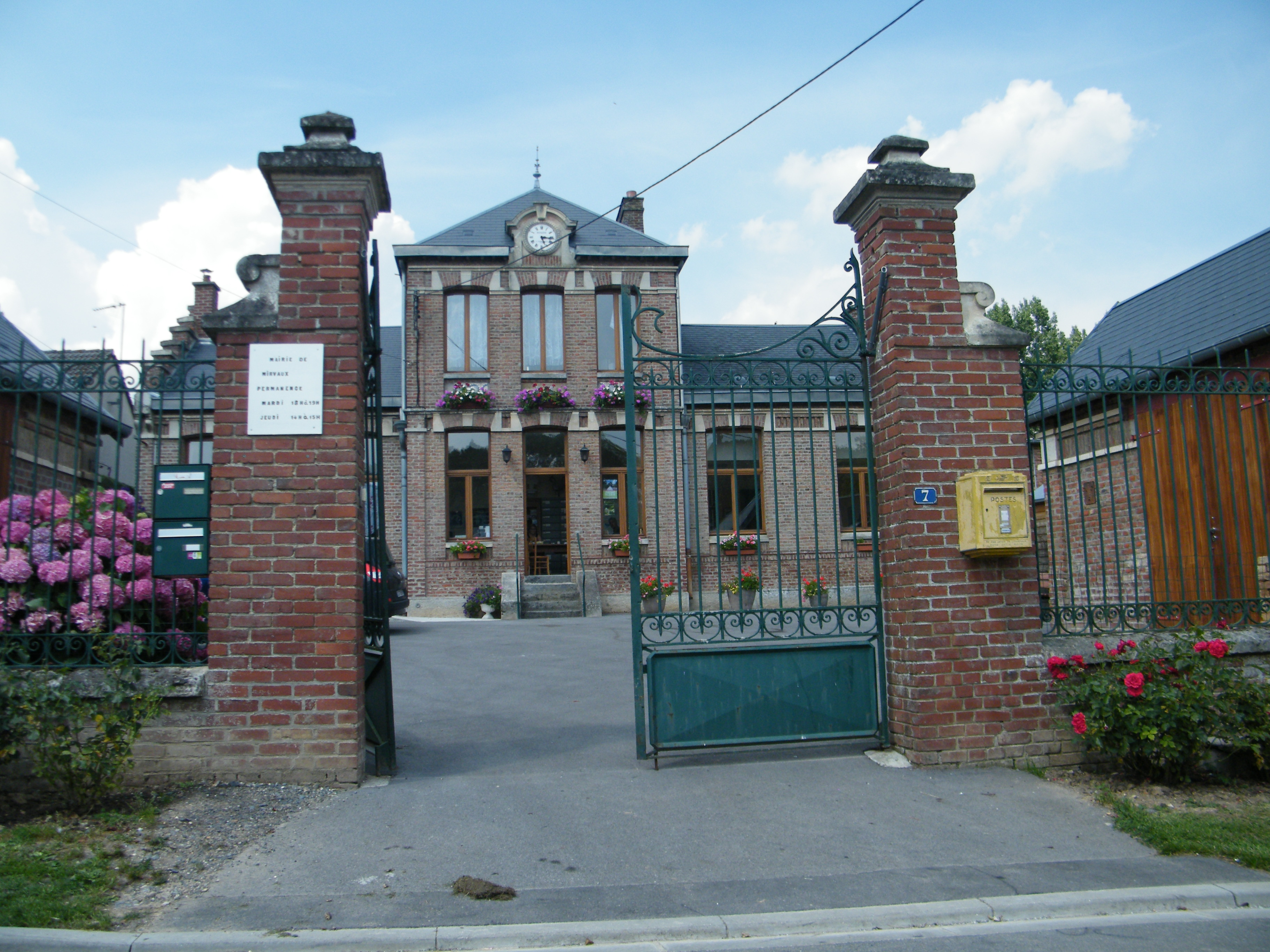
- The town hall in Mirvaux
- Location of Mirvaux
- Location within France Location within Hauts-de-France
- Coordinates: 50°00′12″N 2°23′45″E
- Country: France
- Region: Hauts-de-France
- Department: Somme
- Arrondissement: Amiens
- Canton: Corbie
- Intercommunality: CC Territoire Nord Picardie

Government
  - Mayor (2020–2026): Camille Corsyn
- Area^{1}: 2.29 km^{2} (0.88 sq mi)
- Elevation: 120 m (390 ft)
- Highest elevation: 132 m (433 ft)
- Lowest elevation: 77 m (253 ft)
- Population (2023): 121
  - Density: 52.8/km^{2} (137/sq mi)
- Time zone: UTC+01:00 (CET)
  - Summer (DST): UTC+02:00 (CEST)
- INSEE/Postal code: 80550 /80260
- ^{1} French Land Register data, which excludes lakes, ponds, glaciers > 1 km^{2} (0.386 sq mi or 247 acres) and river estuaries.

Mirvaux (French pronunciation: [miʁvo]) is a commune in the Somme department in Hauts-de-France in northern France.

== Geography ==
Mirvaux is situated on the D11e road, some 13 miles (21 km) northeast of Amiens.

== Population ==
Historical population
Year	Pop.	±% p.a.
1968	66	—
1975	61	−1.12%
1982	105	+8.07%
1990	130	+2.71%
1999	144	+1.14%
2007	153	+0.76%
2012	143	−1.34%
2017	144	+0.14%
2023	121	−2.86%
Source: INSEE

== See also ==
- Communes of the Somme department
