= Cardonnette =

- Commune
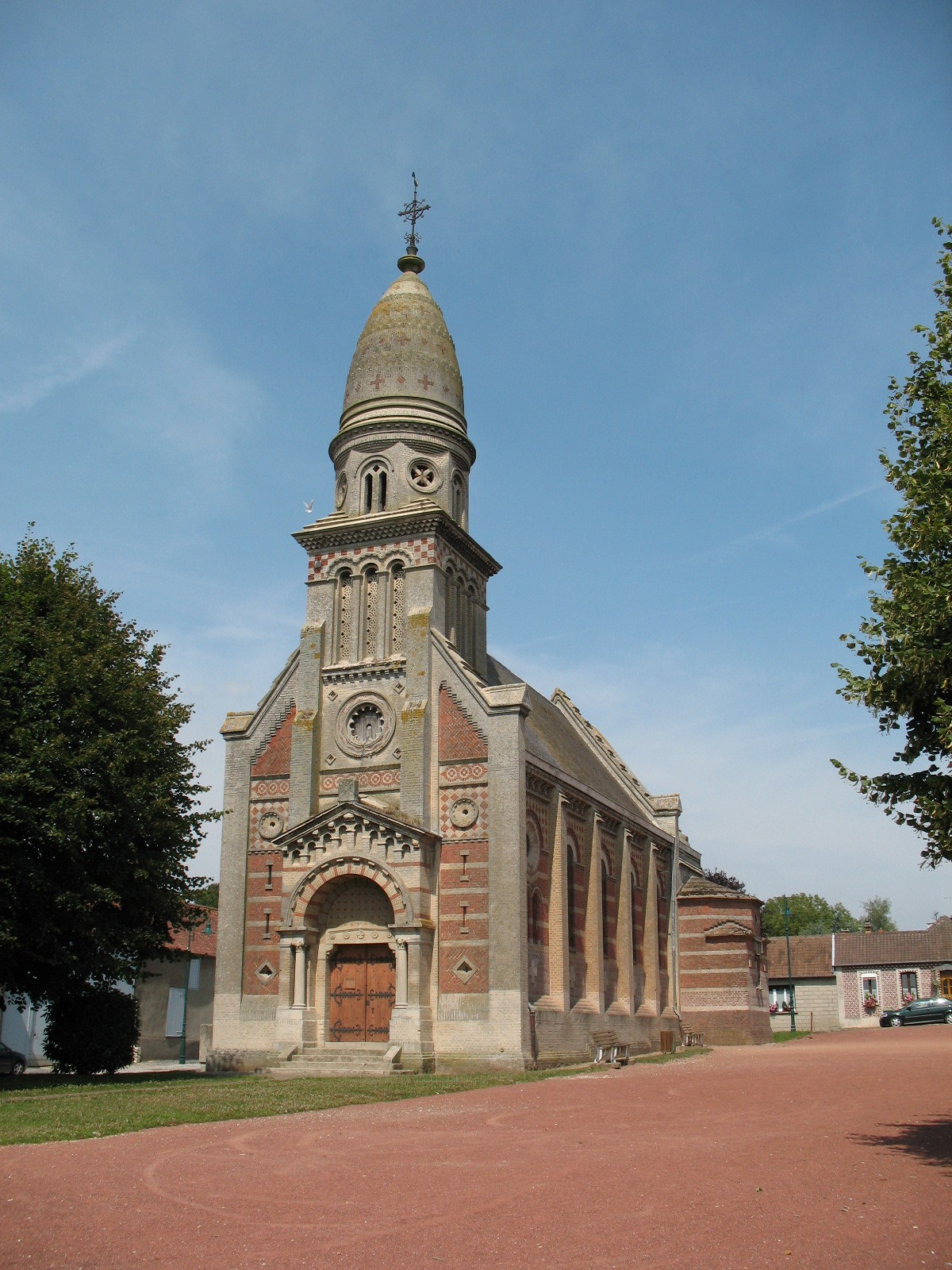
- The church in Cardonnette

- Coat of arms
- Location of Cardonnette
- Location within France Location within Hauts-de-France
- Coordinates: 49°57′07″N 2°21′36″E
- Country: France
- Region: Hauts-de-France
- Department: Somme
- Arrondissement: Amiens
- Canton: Amiens-2
- Intercommunality: CA Amiens Métropole

Government
  - Mayor (2020–2026): Hubert Taufour
- Area^{1}: 5.46 km^{2} (2.11 sq mi)
- Elevation: 80 m (260 ft)
- Highest elevation: 117 m (384 ft)
- Lowest elevation: 56 m (184 ft)
- Population (2023): 513
  - Density: 94.0/km^{2} (243/sq mi)
- Time zone: UTC+01:00 (CET)
  - Summer (DST): UTC+02:00 (CEST)
- INSEE/Postal code: 80173 /80260
- ^{1} French Land Register data, which excludes lakes, ponds, glaciers > 1 km^{2} (0.386 sq mi or 247 acres) and river estuaries.

Cardonnette (French pronunciation: [kaʁdɔnɛt]) is a commune in the Somme department in Hauts-de-France in northern France.

== Geography ==
Cardonette is situated on the D11 and D247 crossroads, just 5 miles (8 km) northwest of Amiens.

== Population ==
Historical population
Year	Pop.	±% p.a.
1968	213	—
1975	275	+3.72%
1982	408	+5.80%
1990	458	+1.46%
1999	417	−1.04%
2007	427	+0.30%
2012	465	+1.72%
2017	518	+2.18%
2023	513	−0.16%
Source: INSEE

== Points of interest ==
- The church, rebuilt after World War I.

== See also ==
- Communes of the Somme department
