= Saint-Gratien, Somme =

Saint-Gratien
- Commune
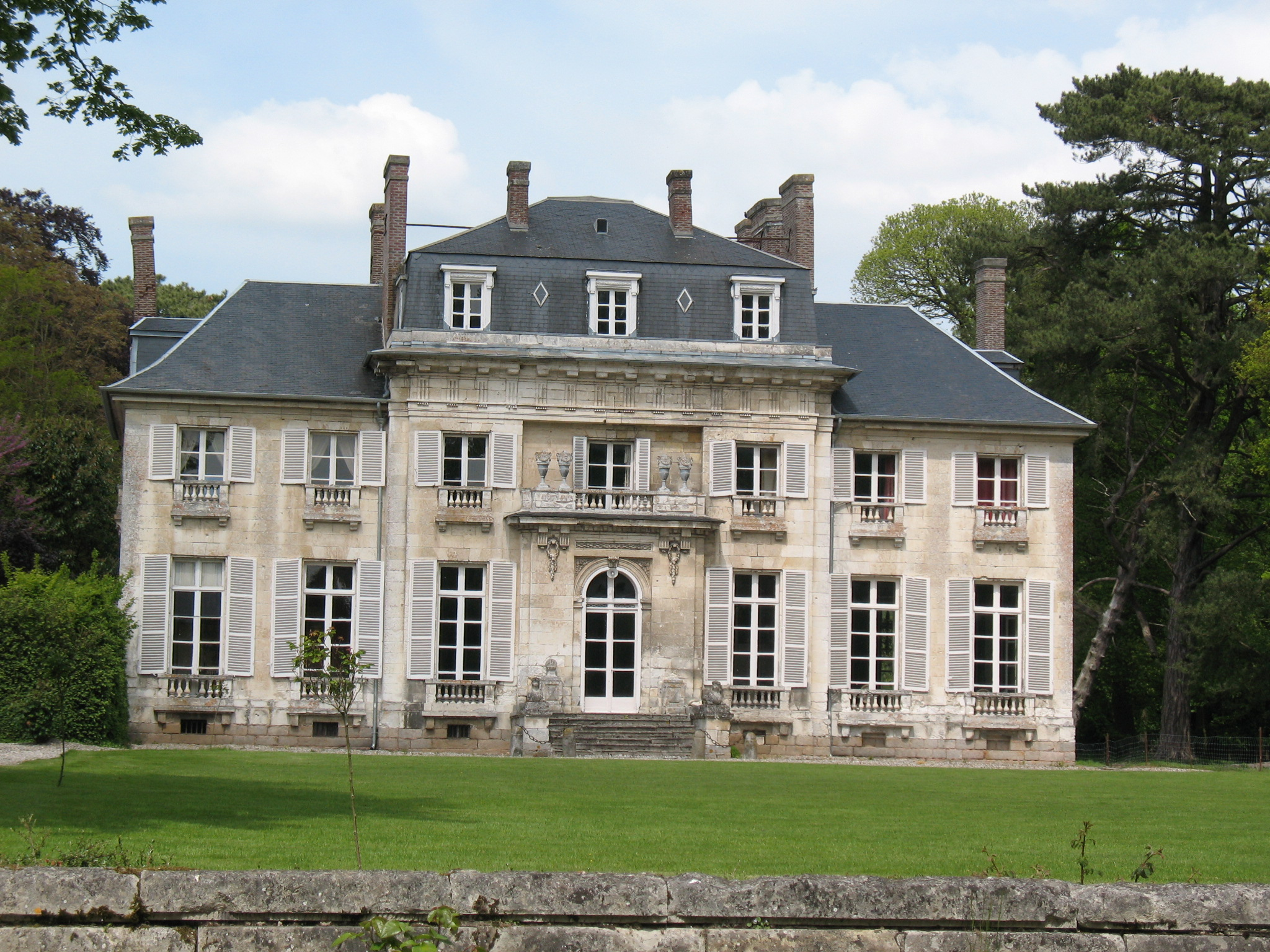
- The chateau of Saint-Gratien
- Location of Saint-Gratien
- Location within France Location within Hauts-de-France
- Coordinates: 49°58′00″N 2°24′34″E
- Country: France
- Region: Hauts-de-France
- Department: Somme
- Arrondissement: Amiens
- Canton: Amiens-2
- Intercommunality: CC Territoire Nord Picardie

Government
  - Mayor (2020–2026): Bruno Massias
- Area^{1}: 6.95 km^{2} (2.68 sq mi)
- Elevation: 90 m (300 ft)
- Highest elevation: 113 m (371 ft)
- Lowest elevation: 48 m (157 ft)
- Population (2023): 383
  - Density: 55.1/km^{2} (143/sq mi)
- Time zone: UTC+01:00 (CET)
  - Summer (DST): UTC+02:00 (CEST)
- INSEE/Postal code: 80704 /80260
- ^{1} French Land Register data, which excludes lakes, ponds, glaciers > 1 km^{2} (0.386 sq mi or 247 acres) and river estuaries.

Saint-Gratien (French pronunciation: [sɛ̃ ɡʁasjɛ̃]) is a commune in the Somme department in Hauts-de-France in northern France.

== Geography ==
The commune is situated some 6 miles (10 km) northeast of Amiens, on the D30 and D919 roads.

== Population ==
Historical population
Year	Pop.	±% p.a.
1968	225	—
1975	240	+0.93%
1982	337	+4.97%
1990	362	+0.90%
1999	371	+0.27%
2007	351	−0.69%
2012	370	+1.06%
2017	377	+0.38%
2023	383	+0.26%
Source: INSEE

== See also ==
- Communes of the Somme department
