= Béhencourt =

- Commune
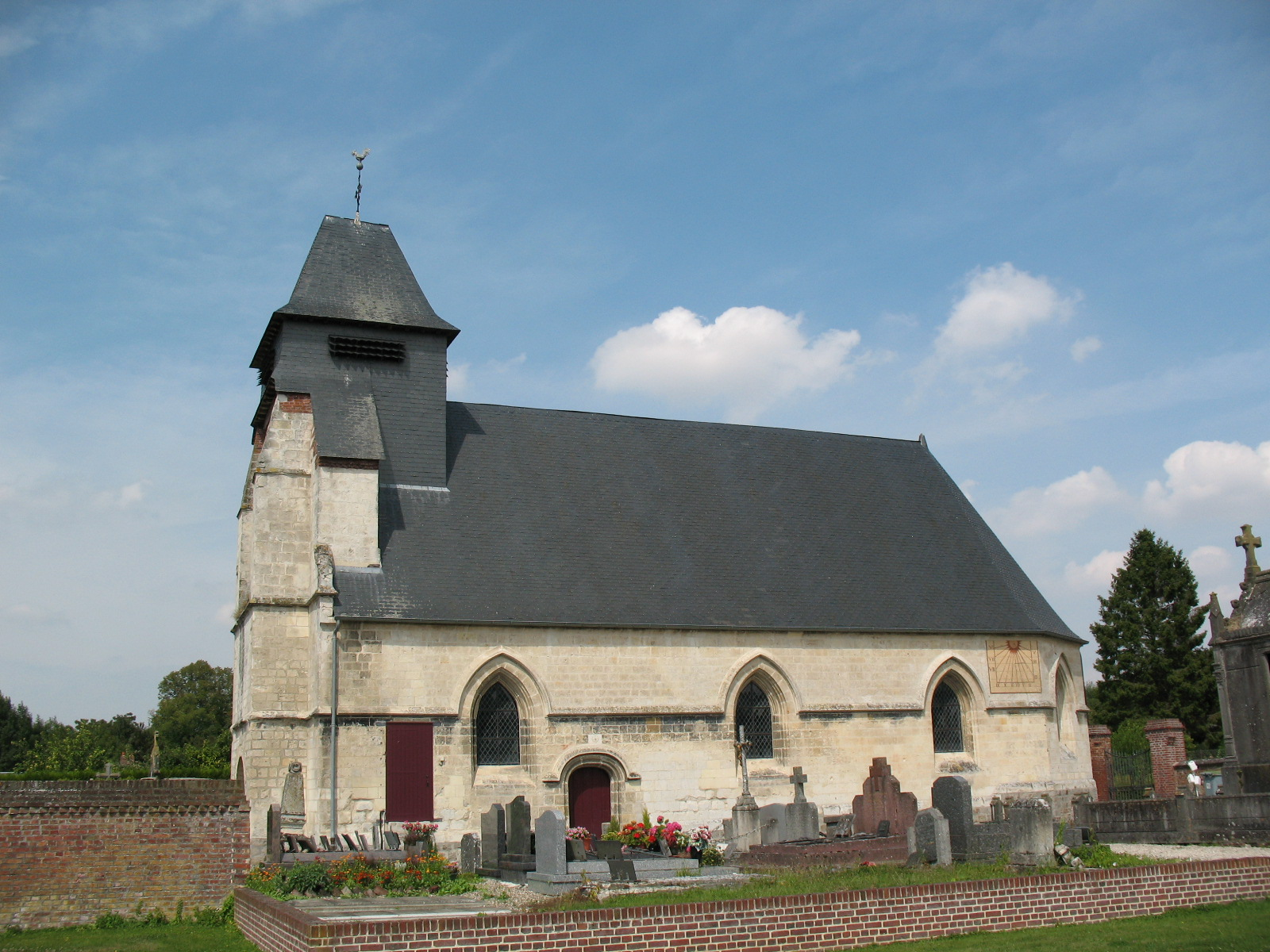
- The church in Béhencourt
- Location of Béhencourt
- Location within France Location within Hauts-de-France
- Coordinates: 49°58′32″N 2°27′13″E
- Country: France
- Region: Hauts-de-France
- Department: Somme
- Arrondissement: Amiens
- Canton: Corbie
- Intercommunality: CC Territoire Nord Picardie

Government
  - Mayor (2020–2026): Philippe Plaisant
- Area^{1}: 7.06 km^{2} (2.73 sq mi)
- Elevation: 35 m (115 ft)
- Highest elevation: 122 m (400 ft)
- Lowest elevation: 43 m (141 ft)
- Population (2023): 301
  - Density: 42.6/km^{2} (110/sq mi)
- Time zone: UTC+01:00 (CET)
  - Summer (DST): UTC+02:00 (CEST)
- INSEE/Postal code: 80077 /80260
- ^{1} French Land Register data, which excludes lakes, ponds, glaciers > 1 km^{2} (0.386 sq mi or 247 acres) and river estuaries.

Béhencourt (French pronunciation: [beɑ̃kuʁ]; Picard: Béhincourt) is a commune in the Somme department in Hauts-de-France in northern France.

== Geography ==
The commune is situated at the junction of the D78 and D115 roads, about 10 miles (16 km) northeast of Amiens

== Population ==
Historical population
Year	Pop.	±% p.a.
1968	221	—
1975	219	−0.13%
1982	233	+0.89%
1990	313	+3.76%
1999	353	+1.35%
2007	356	+0.11%
2012	348	−0.45%
2017	333	−0.88%
2023	301	−1.67%
Source: INSEE

== See also ==
- Communes of the Somme department
