= Montigny-sur-l'Hallue =

- Commune
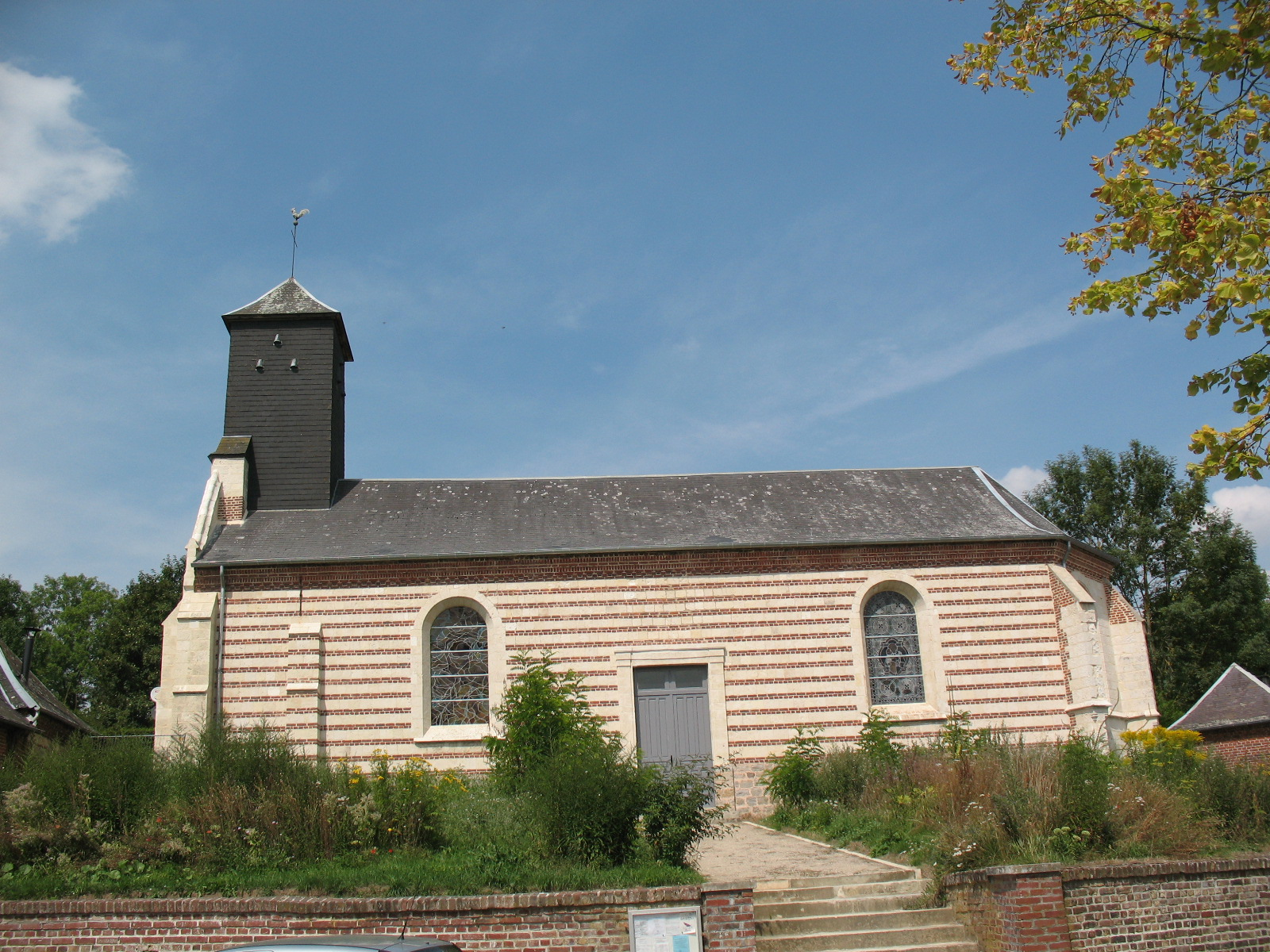
- The church in Montigny-sur-l'Hallue
- Location of Montigny-sur-l'Hallue
- Location within France Location within Hauts-de-France
- Coordinates: 49°58′50″N 2°26′37″E
- Country: France
- Region: Hauts-de-France
- Department: Somme
- Arrondissement: Amiens
- Canton: Corbie
- Intercommunality: CC Territoire Nord Picardie

Government
  - Mayor (2024–2026): Dominique Munier
- Area^{1}: 4.91 km^{2} (1.90 sq mi)
- Highest elevation: 116 m (381 ft)
- Lowest elevation: 43 m (141 ft)
- Population (2023): 175
  - Density: 35.6/km^{2} (92.3/sq mi)
- Demonym: Montignyens
- Time zone: UTC+01:00 (CET)
  - Summer (DST): UTC+02:00 (CEST)
- INSEE/Postal code: 80562 /80260
- ^{1} French Land Register data, which excludes lakes, ponds, glaciers > 1 km^{2} (0.386 sq mi or 247 acres) and river estuaries.

Montigny-sur-l'Hallue (French pronunciation: [mɔ̃tiɲi syʁ laly]; Picard: Montignin-su-l'Hallue) is a commune in the Somme department in Hauts-de-France in northern France.

== Geography ==
The commune is situated on the D78 road, some 13 miles (21 km) northeast of Amiens.

== Population ==
Historical population
Year	Pop.	±% p.a.
1968	67	—
1975	92	+4.63%
1982	171	+9.26%
1990	174	+0.22%
1999	197	+1.39%
2007	211	+0.86%
2012	219	+0.75%
2017	205	−1.31%
2023	175	−2.60%
Source: INSEE

== Personalities ==
- Albin de la Simone, singer and composer

== See also ==
- Communes of the Somme department
