= Saint-Vaast-en-Chaussée =

- Commune
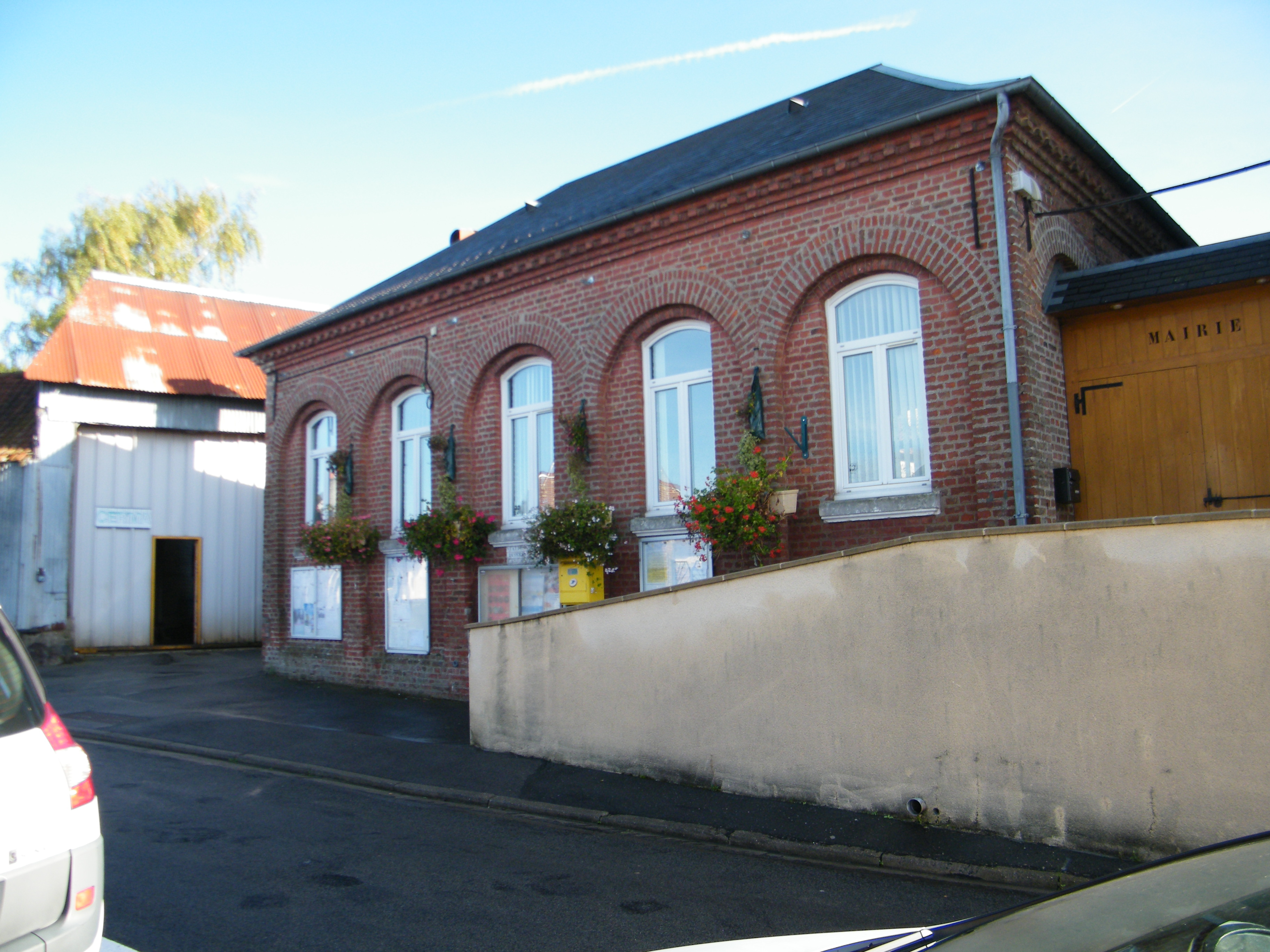
- The town hall in Saint-Vaast-en-Chaussée

- Coat of arms
- Location of Saint-Vaast-en-Chaussée
- Location within France Location within Hauts-de-France
- Coordinates: 49°58′15″N 2°12′23″E
- Country: France
- Region: Hauts-de-France
- Department: Somme
- Arrondissement: Amiens
- Canton: Flixecourt
- Intercommunality: CA Amiens Métropole

Government
  - Mayor (2020–2026): Marc Vignolle
- Area^{1}: 4.72 km^{2} (1.82 sq mi)
- Elevation: 52 m (171 ft)
- Highest elevation: 95 m (312 ft)
- Lowest elevation: 20 m (66 ft)
- Population (2023): 504
  - Density: 107/km^{2} (277/sq mi)
- Time zone: UTC+01:00 (CET)
  - Summer (DST): UTC+02:00 (CEST)
- INSEE/Postal code: 80722 /80310
- ^{1} French Land Register data, which excludes lakes, ponds, glaciers > 1 km^{2} (0.386 sq mi or 247 acres) and river estuaries.

Saint-Vaast-en-Chaussée (Picard: Saint-Vo-in-Cœuchie) is a commune in the Somme department in Hauts-de-France in northern France.

== Geography ==
The commune is situated 11 kilometres (7 mi) northwest of Amiens, on the D12 road, which follows the Roman road called the Chaussée Brunehaut.

== Population ==
Historical population
Year	Pop.	±% p.a.
1968	281	—
1975	347	+3.06%
1982	484	+4.87%
1990	528	+1.09%
1999	563	+0.72%
2007	511	−1.20%
2012	515	+0.16%
2017	495	−0.79%
2023	504	+0.30%
Source: INSEE

== See also ==
- Communes of the Somme department
