= Talmas =

- Commune
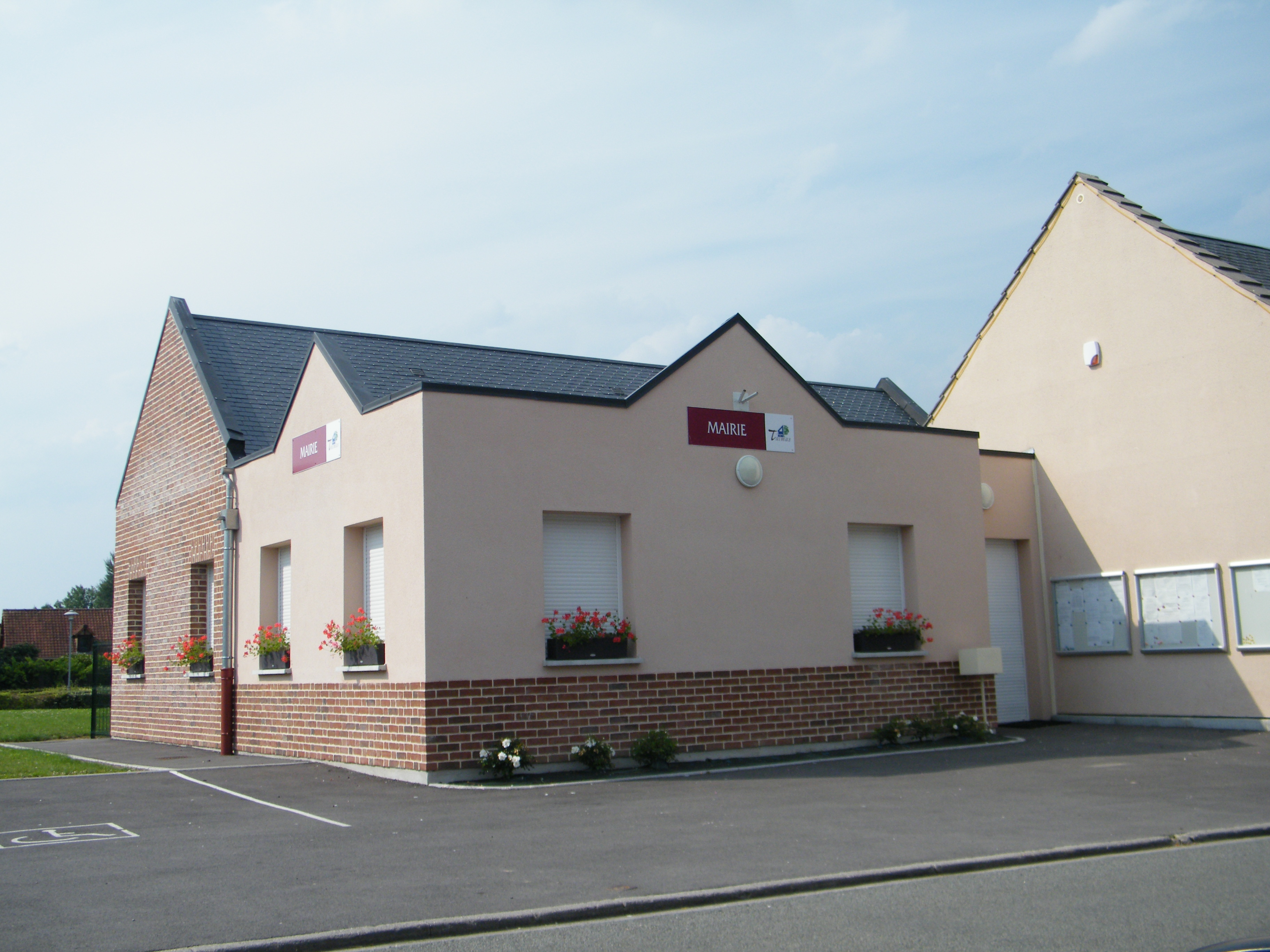
- The town hall in Talmas
- Location of Talmas
- Location within France Location within Hauts-de-France
- Coordinates: 50°01′50″N 2°19′38″E
- Country: France
- Region: Hauts-de-France
- Department: Somme
- Arrondissement: Amiens
- Canton: Corbie
- Intercommunality: CC Territoire Nord Picardie

Government
  - Mayor (2020–2026): Patrick Blocklet
- Area^{1}: 19.2 km^{2} (7.4 sq mi)
- Elevation: 145 m (476 ft)
- Highest elevation: 154 m (505 ft)
- Lowest elevation: 87 m (285 ft)
- Population (2023): 1,085
  - Density: 56.5/km^{2} (146/sq mi)
- Time zone: UTC+01:00 (CET)
  - Summer (DST): UTC+02:00 (CEST)
- INSEE/Postal code: 80746 /80260
- ^{1} French Land Register data, which excludes lakes, ponds, glaciers > 1 km^{2} (0.386 sq mi or 247 acres) and river estuaries.

Talmas (French pronunciation: [talma]; Picard: Talmar) is a commune in the Somme department in Hauts-de-France in northern France.

== Geography ==
Talmas is situated 11 miles (18 km) north of Amiens, on the N25 and D60 crossroads

== Population ==
Historical population
Year	Pop.	±% p.a.
1968	448	—
1975	554	+3.08%
1982	787	+5.14%
1990	1,027	+3.38%
1999	1,053	+0.28%
2007	1,086	+0.39%
2012	1,078	−0.15%
2017	1,067	−0.20%
2023	1,085	+0.28%
Source: INSEE

== Places of interest ==
Known for the « muches », a vast network of natural and man-made galleries in the limestone, where the local population hid and lived during the Spanish occupation in the 16th century.

== See also ==
- Communes of the Somme department
