= Montonvillers =

- Commune
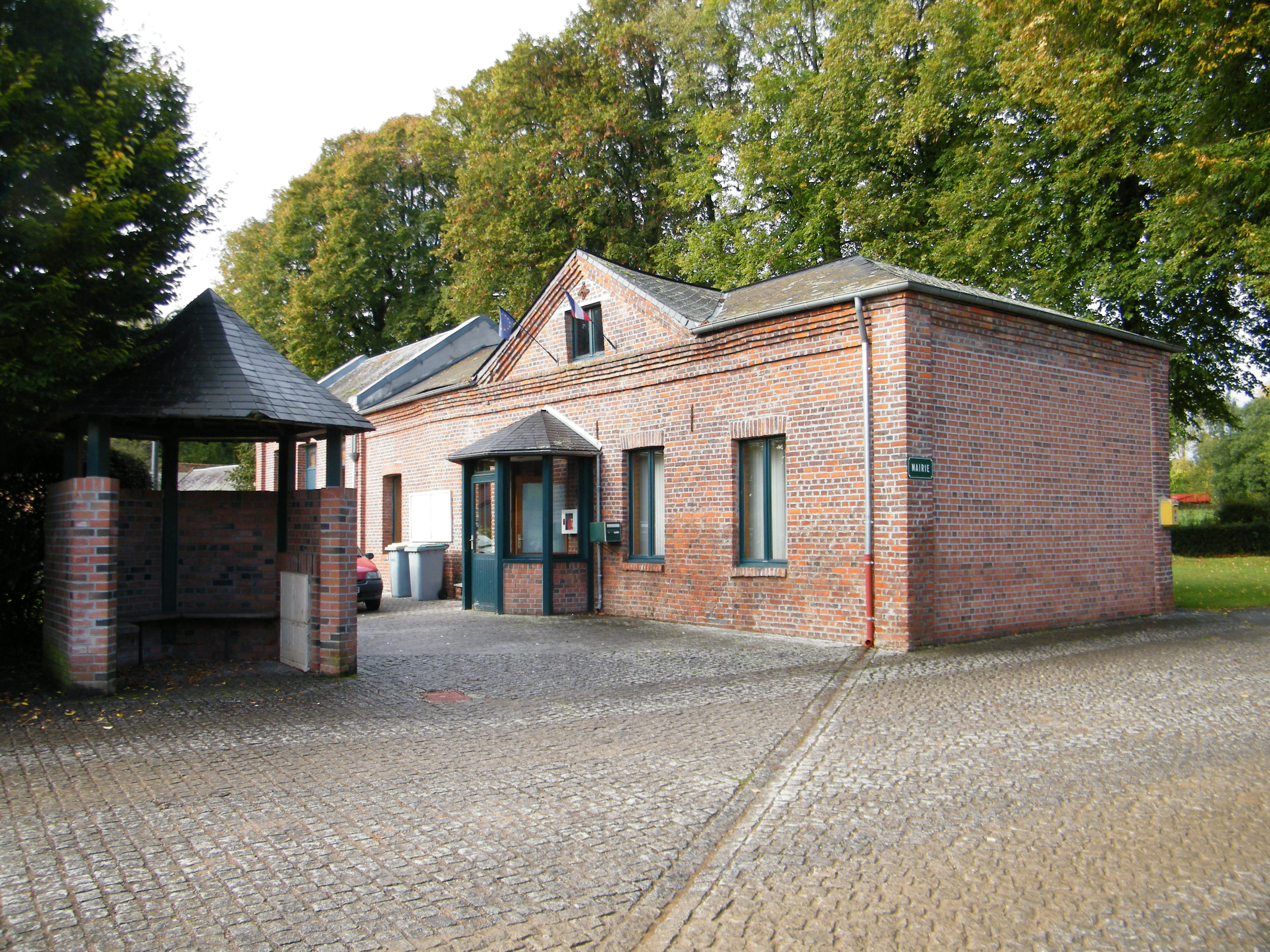
- The town hall in Montonvillers
- Location of Montonvillers
- Location within France Location within Hauts-de-France
- Coordinates: 49°59′39″N 2°17′47″E
- Country: France
- Region: Hauts-de-France
- Department: Somme
- Arrondissement: Amiens
- Canton: Amiens-2
- Intercommunality: CC Territoire Nord Picardie

Government
  - Mayor (2020–2026): Laurent Crampon
- Area^{1}: 1.48 km^{2} (0.57 sq mi)
- Elevation: 118 m (387 ft)
- Highest elevation: 130 m (430 ft)
- Lowest elevation: 104 m (341 ft)
- Population (2023): 93
  - Density: 63/km^{2} (160/sq mi)
- Time zone: UTC+01:00 (CET)
  - Summer (DST): UTC+02:00 (CEST)
- INSEE/Postal code: 80565 /80260
- ^{1} French Land Register data, which excludes lakes, ponds, glaciers > 1 km^{2} (0.386 sq mi or 247 acres) and river estuaries.

Montonvillers (Picard: Moutonvilé) is a commune in the Somme department in Hauts-de-France in northern France.

== Geography ==
Montonvillers is situated on the D113e road, some 12 miles (19 km) north of Amiens.

== Population ==
Historical population
Year	Pop.	±% p.a.
1968	46	—
1975	62	+4.36%
1982	83	+4.26%
1990	72	−1.76%
1999	71	−0.16%
2007	97	+3.98%
2012	94	−0.63%
2017	82	−2.69%
2023	93	+2.12%
Source: INSEE

== See also ==
- Communes of the Somme department
