= Bavelincourt =

- Commune
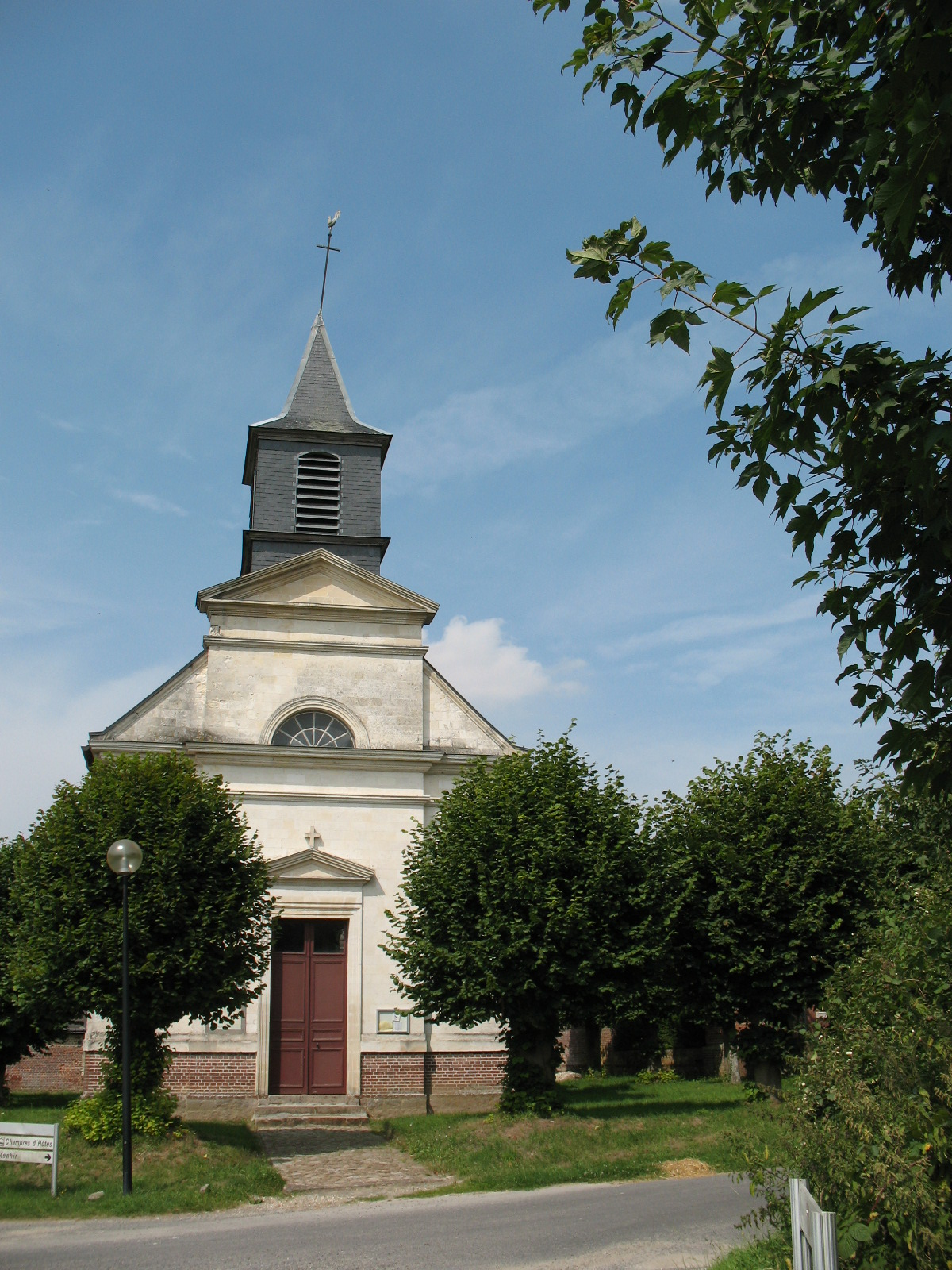
- The church in Bavelincourt
- Location of Bavelincourt
- Location within France Location within Hauts-de-France
- Coordinates: 49°59′14″N 2°27′19″E
- Country: France
- Region: Hauts-de-France
- Department: Somme
- Arrondissement: Amiens
- Canton: Corbie
- Intercommunality: CC Territoire Nord Picardie

Government
  - Mayor (2020–2026): Alain Jumelle
- Area^{1}: 7.75 km^{2} (2.99 sq mi)
- Elevation: 49 m (161 ft)
- Highest elevation: 128 m (420 ft)
- Lowest elevation: 42 m (138 ft)
- Population (2023): 104
  - Density: 13.4/km^{2} (34.8/sq mi)
- Time zone: UTC+01:00 (CET)
  - Summer (DST): UTC+02:00 (CEST)
- INSEE/Postal code: 80056 /80260
- ^{1} French Land Register data, which excludes lakes, ponds, glaciers > 1 km^{2} (0.386 sq mi or 247 acres) and river estuaries.

Bavelincourt (French pronunciation: [bavlɛ̃kuʁ]; Picard: Blavincourt) is a commune in the Somme department in Hauts-de-France in northern France.

== Geography ==
Bavelincourt is situated on the D119 road, 24 kilometres (15 mi) northeast of Amiens.

== Population ==
Historical population
Year	Pop.	±% p.a.
1968	87	—
1975	81	−1.02%
1982	67	−2.67%
1990	74	+1.25%
1999	85	+1.55%
2007	112	+3.51%
2012	133	+3.50%
2017	106	−4.44%
2023	104	−0.32%
Source: INSEE

== See also ==
- Communes of the Somme department
