= Coisy =

- Commune
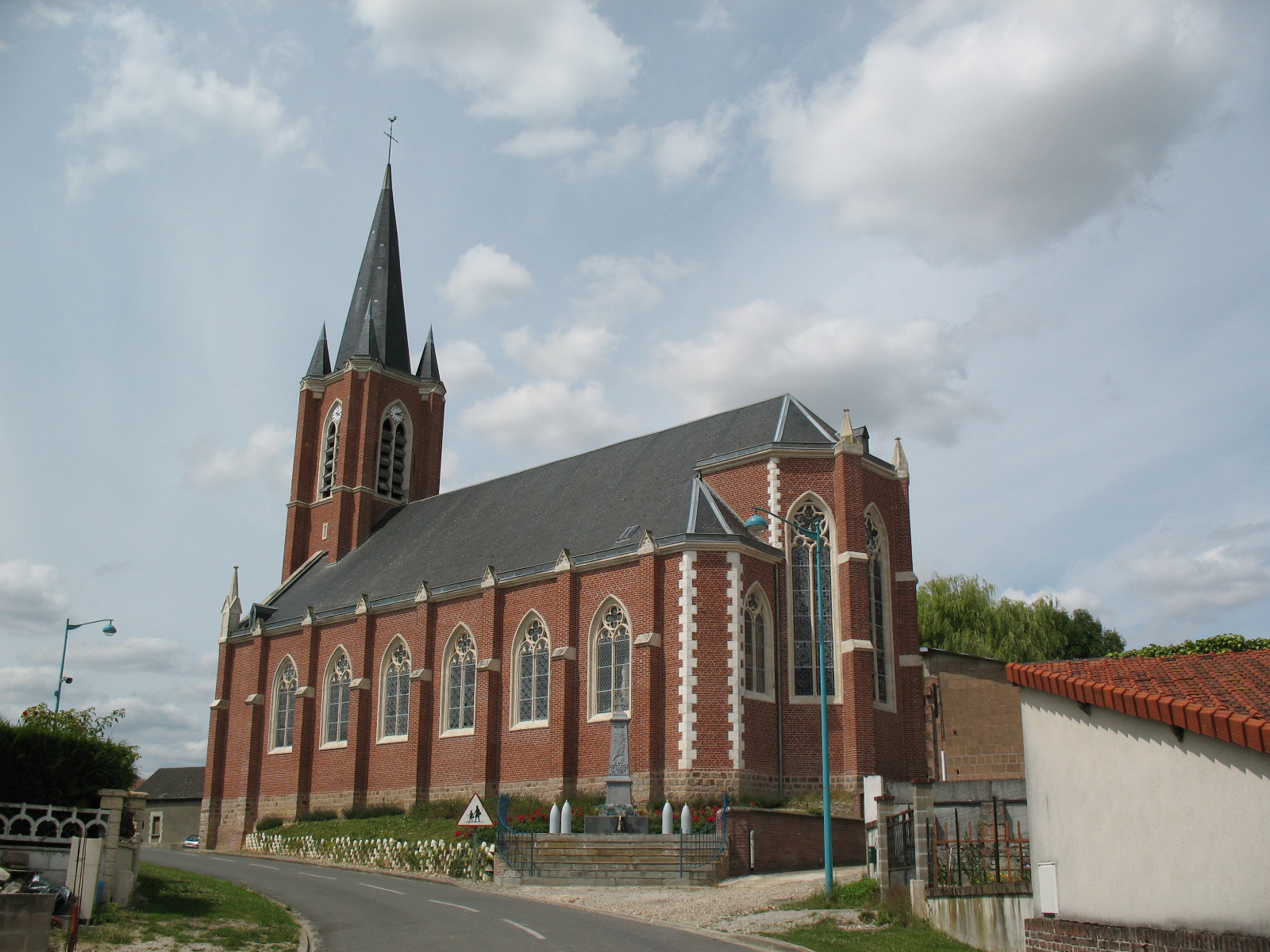
- The church in Coisy
- Location of Coisy
- Location within France Location within Hauts-de-France
- Coordinates: 49°57′38″N 2°19′42″E
- Country: France
- Region: Hauts-de-France
- Department: Somme
- Arrondissement: Amiens
- Canton: Amiens-2
- Intercommunality: CC Territoire Nord Picardie

Government
  - Mayor (2020–2026): Claude Deflesselle
- Area^{1}: 6.08 km^{2} (2.35 sq mi)
- Elevation: 110 m (360 ft)
- Highest elevation: 129 m (423 ft)
- Lowest elevation: 71 m (233 ft)
- Population (2023): 387
  - Density: 63.7/km^{2} (165/sq mi)
- Time zone: UTC+01:00 (CET)
  - Summer (DST): UTC+02:00 (CEST)
- INSEE/Postal code: 80202 /80260
- ^{1} French Land Register data, which excludes lakes, ponds, glaciers > 1 km^{2} (0.386 sq mi or 247 acres) and river estuaries.

Coisy (French pronunciation: [kwazi]; Picard: Coésy) is a commune in the Somme department in Hauts-de-France in northern France.

== Geography ==
Coisy is situated on the D11a between the D11 and the N25, some 5 miles (8 km) north of Amiens.

== History ==
Coisy is first mentioned in the 12th century, when it was under the jurisdiction of the seigneurs of Beauquesne.

A Benedictine priory was established at the hamlet of Flesserolles in 1156, under Anchin Abbey.

By the end of the 14th century, Coisy was governed by the Bureau de la Rivière.

Protestant assemblies were set up in 1570.

Marshall Biron and his troops stopped here in 1597, during the French Wars of Religion.

== Population ==
Historical population
Year	Pop.	±% p.a.
1968	196	—
1975	175	−1.61%
1982	184	+0.72%
1990	226	+2.60%
1999	246	+0.95%
2007	284	+1.81%
2012	302	+1.24%
2017	340	+2.40%
2023	387	+2.18%
Source: INSEE

== See also ==
- Communes of the Somme department
