= Pierregot =

- Commune
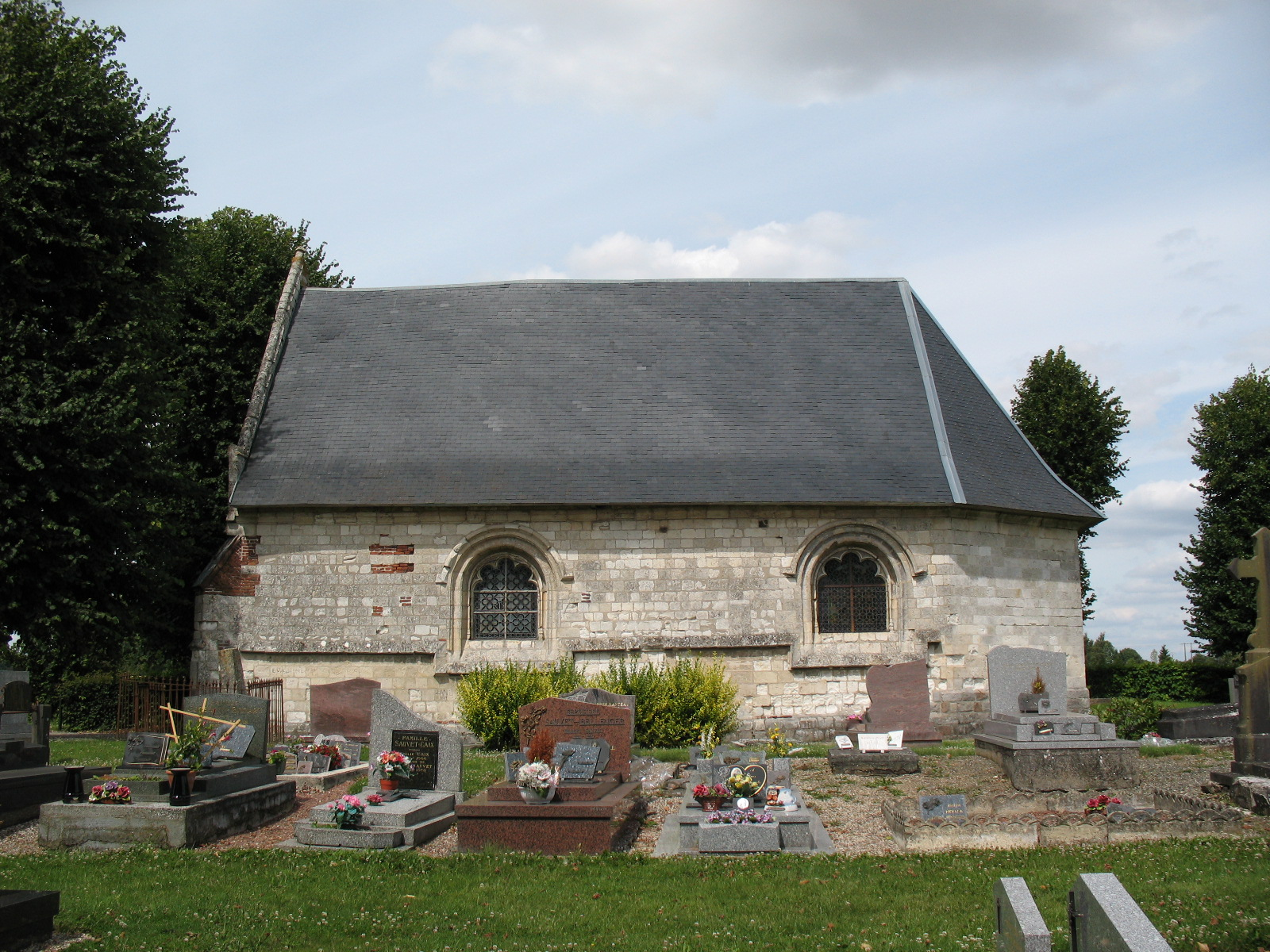
- The chapel of Notre-Dame O Pie, in Pierregot
- Location of Pierregot
- Location within France Location within Hauts-de-France
- Coordinates: 50°00′09″N 2°22′49″E
- Country: France
- Region: Hauts-de-France
- Department: Somme
- Arrondissement: Amiens
- Canton: Corbie
- Intercommunality: CC Territoire Nord Picardie

Government
  - Mayor (2020–2026): Loïc Dupont
- Area^{1}: 2.46 km^{2} (0.95 sq mi)
- Elevation: 118 m (387 ft)
- Highest elevation: 134 m (440 ft)
- Lowest elevation: 95 m (312 ft)
- Population (2023): 280
  - Density: 110/km^{2} (290/sq mi)
- Time zone: UTC+01:00 (CET)
  - Summer (DST): UTC+02:00 (CEST)
- INSEE/Postal code: 80624 /80260
- ^{1} French Land Register data, which excludes lakes, ponds, glaciers > 1 km^{2} (0.386 sq mi or 247 acres) and river estuaries.

Pierregot (French pronunciation: [pjɛʁɡo]; Pièrgou in Picard) is a commune in the Somme department in Hauts-de-France in northern France.

== Geography ==
Pierregot is situated on the D11 road, some 10 miles (16 km) northeast of Amiens.

== Mayors ==
- Daniel Sauvet (2008–2014)
- Gérard Philippe (2001–2008)

== Population ==
Historical population
Year	Pop.	±% p.a.
1968	179	—
1975	180	+0.08%
1982	211	+2.30%
1990	250	+2.14%
1999	243	−0.32%
2007	249	+0.31%
2012	257	+0.63%
2017	280	+1.73%
2023	280	+0.00%
Source: INSEE

== See also ==
- Communes of the Somme department
