= Villers-Bocage, Somme =

Villers-Bocage
- Commune
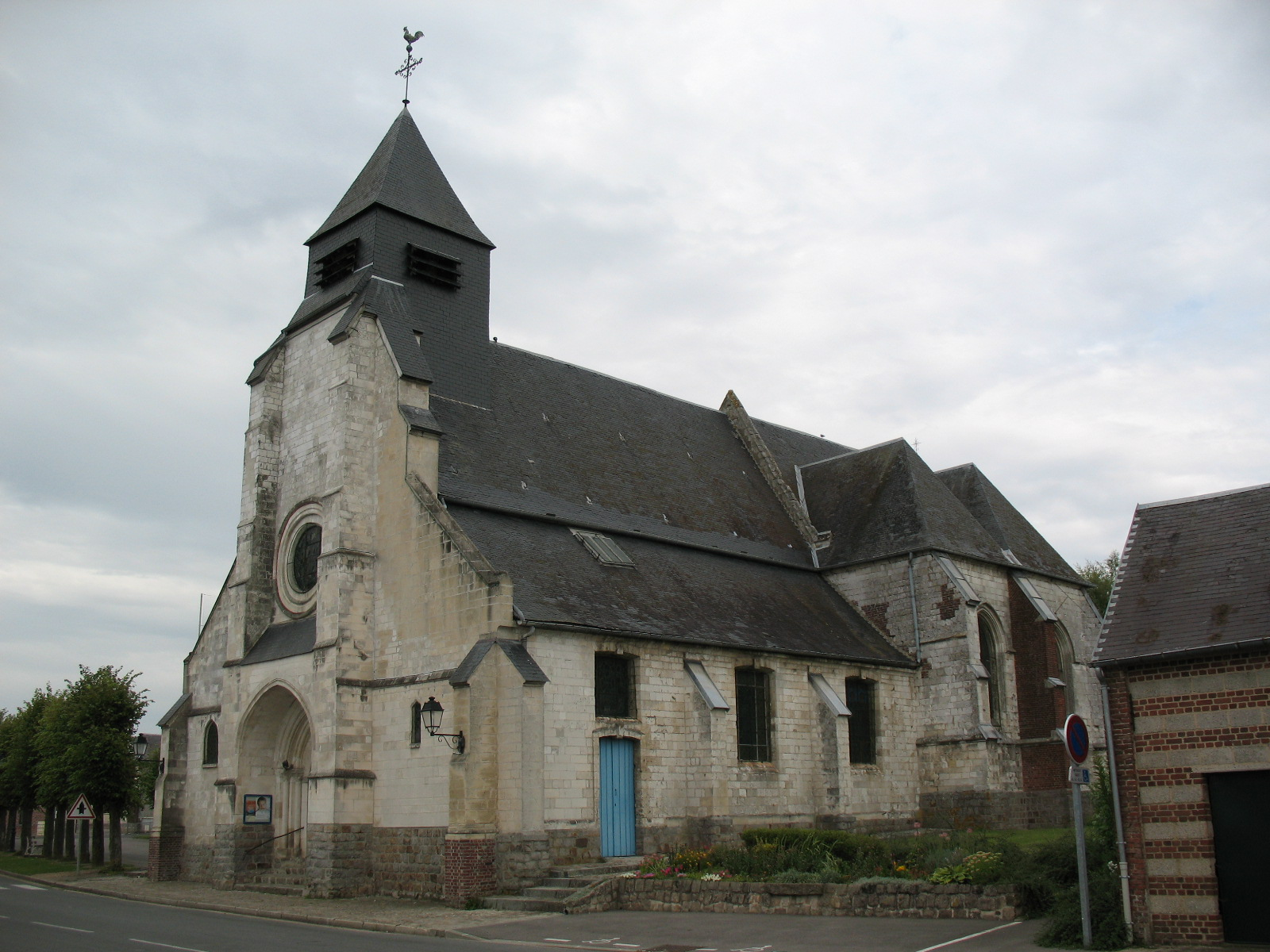
- The church in Villers-Bocage

- Coat of arms
- Location of Villers-Bocage
- Location within France Location within Hauts-de-France
- Coordinates: 49°59′52″N 2°19′06″E
- Country: France
- Region: Hauts-de-France
- Department: Somme
- Arrondissement: Amiens
- Canton: Amiens-2
- Intercommunality: CC Territoire Nord Picardie

Government
  - Mayor (2020–2026): Anne-Sophie Domont
- Area^{1}: 14.17 km^{2} (5.47 sq mi)
- Elevation: 133 m (436 ft)
- Highest elevation: 136 m (446 ft)
- Lowest elevation: 85 m (279 ft)
- Population (2023): 1,545
  - Density: 109.0/km^{2} (282.4/sq mi)
- Time zone: UTC+01:00 (CET)
  - Summer (DST): UTC+02:00 (CEST)
- INSEE/Postal code: 80798 /80260
- ^{1} French Land Register data, which excludes lakes, ponds, glaciers > 1 km^{2} (0.386 sq mi or 247 acres) and river estuaries.

Villers-Bocage (French pronunciation: [vilɛʁ bɔkaʒ]) is a commune in the Somme department in Hauts-de-France in northern France.

== Geography ==
The commune is situated 8 miles (13 km) north of Amiens, on the N25 road.

== Population ==
Historical population

Year	Pop.	±% p.a.
1793	1,040	—
1851	1,575	+0.72%
1901	824	−1.29%
1954	653	−0.44%
1962	683	+0.56%
1968	750	+1.57%
1975	1,009	+4.33%

Year	Pop.	±% p.a.
1982	984	−0.36%
1990	1,094	+1.33%
1999	1,309	+2.01%
2007	1,433	+1.14%
2012	1,426	−0.10%
2017	1,422	−0.06%
2023	1,545	+1.39%

Source: EHESS and INSEE (1968–2023)

== See also ==
- Communes of the Somme department
