= Canton of Molliens-Dreuil =

Coordinates: 49°53′2″N 2°1′12″E

Molliens-Dreuil
- Former canton
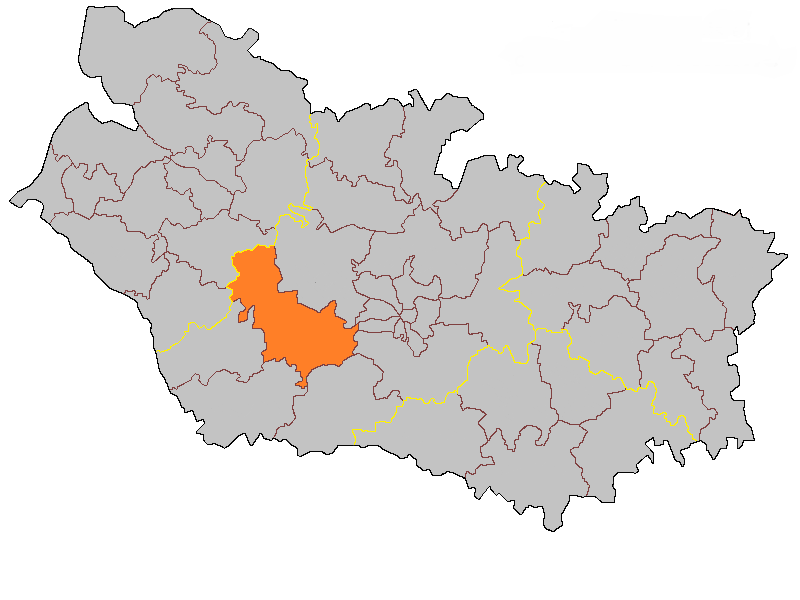
- Country: France
- Region: Hauts-de-France
- Department: Somme
- No. of communes: {{{nbcomm}}}
- Disbanded: 2015
- Area: 229.65 km^{2} (88.67 sq mi)
- Population (2012): 10,109
  - Density: 44.019/km^{2} (114.01/sq mi)

The Canton of Molliens-Dreuil is a former canton situated in the department of the Somme and in the Picardie region of northern France. It was disbanded following the French canton reorganisation which came into effect in March 2015. It had 10,109 inhabitants (2012).

== Geography ==
The canton is organised around the commune of Molliens-Dreuil in the arrondissement of Amiens. The altitude varies from 11m at Bettencourt-Rivière to 160m at Saint-Aubin-Montenoy for an average of 83m.

The canton comprised 27 communes:

- Airaines
- Avelesges
- Bettencourt-Rivière
- Bougainville
- Bovelles
- Briquemesnil-Floxicourt
- Camps-en-Amiénois
- Clairy-Saulchoix
- Creuse
- Fluy
- Fresnoy-au-Val
- Guignemicourt
- Laleu
- Métigny
- Molliens-Dreuil
- Montagne-Fayel
- Oissy
- Pissy
- Quesnoy-sur-Airaines
- Quevauvillers
- Revelles
- Riencourt
- Saint-Aubin-Montenoy
- Saisseval
- Seux
- Tailly
- Warlus

== Population ==
1962	1968	1975	1982	1990	1999
7485	8103	8270	9200	9715	9595
Census count starting from 1962 : Population without double counting

== See also ==
- Arrondissements of the Somme department
- Cantons of the Somme department
- Communes of the Somme department
