= Warlus =

Warlus is the name of 2 communes in northern France:

- Warlus, Pas-de-Calais
- Warlus, Somme
