= Cavillon =

- Commune
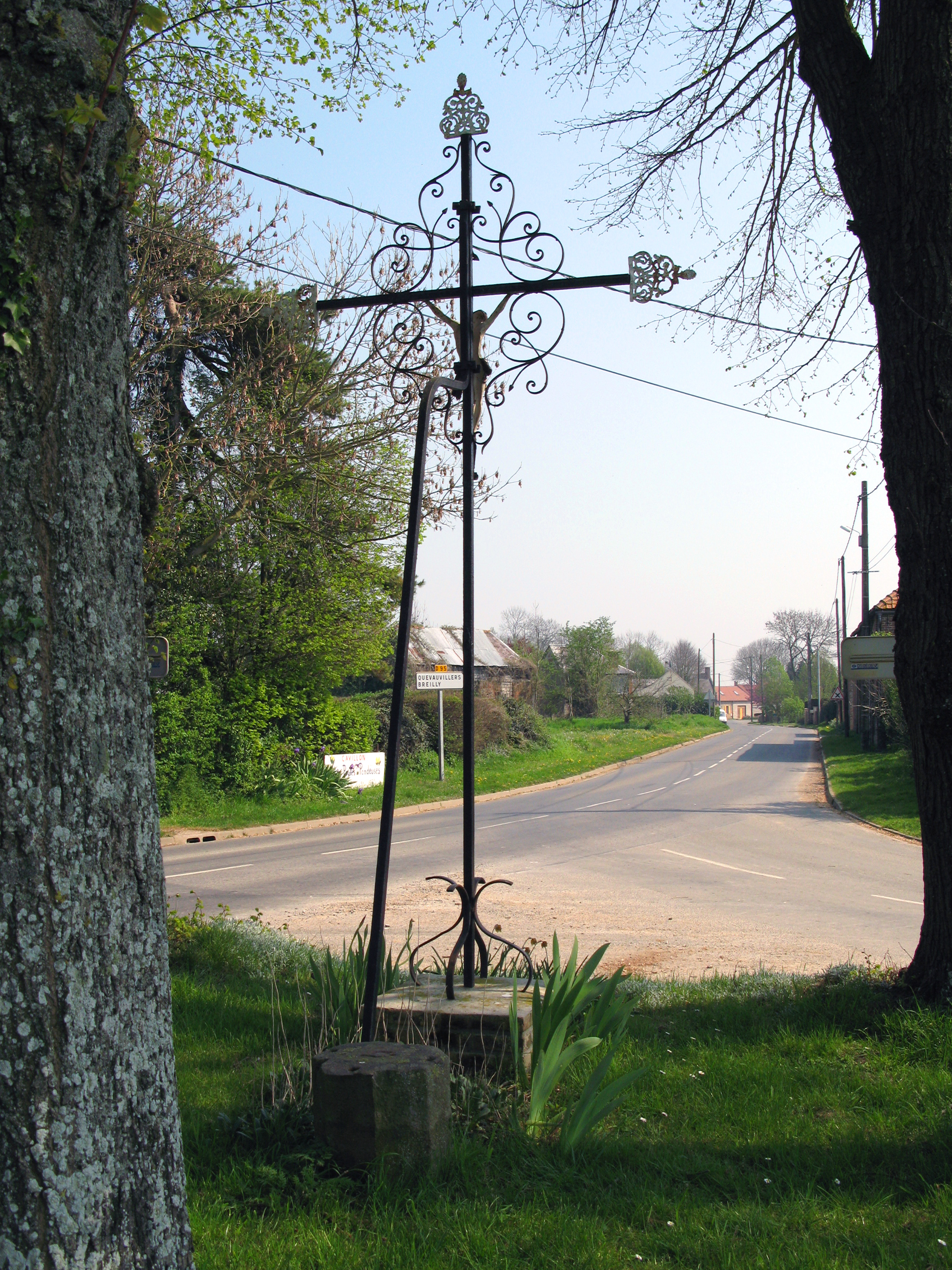
- The road into Cavillon, from the north, and crucifix
- Location of Cavillon
- Location within France Location within Hauts-de-France
- Coordinates: 49°55′23″N 2°05′05″E
- Country: France
- Region: Hauts-de-France
- Department: Somme
- Arrondissement: Amiens
- Canton: Ailly-sur-Somme
- Intercommunality: CC Nièvre et Somme

Government
  - Mayor (2020–2026): Jean-Philippe Delfosse
- Area^{1}: 5.46 km^{2} (2.11 sq mi)
- Elevation: 120 m (390 ft)
- Highest elevation: 126 m (413 ft)
- Lowest elevation: 40 m (130 ft)
- Population (2023): 90
  - Density: 16/km^{2} (43/sq mi)
- Time zone: UTC+01:00 (CET)
  - Summer (DST): UTC+02:00 (CEST)
- INSEE/Postal code: 80180 /80310
- ^{1} French Land Register data, which excludes lakes, ponds, glaciers > 1 km^{2} (0.386 sq mi or 247 acres) and river estuaries.

Cavillon (French pronunciation: [kavijɔ̃]; Picard: Cavion) is a commune in the Somme department in Hauts-de-France in northern France.

== Geography ==
Cavillon is a small village surrounded by fields and woods, situated on the D121, D156 and D95 crossroads, about15 miles (24 km) northwest of Amiens. It is predominantly a farming area raising dairy cows, pigs and free-range chickens. A project to create a large pig-rearing facility is currently undergoing discussion and planning approval, much to the disgruntlement of the local population.

== Population ==
Historical population
Year	Pop.	±% p.a.
1968	111	—
1975	117	+0.75%
1982	116	−0.12%
1990	112	−0.44%
1999	94	−1.93%
2007	109	+1.87%
2012	103	−1.13%
2017	103	+0.00%
2023	90	−2.22%
Source: INSEE

== History ==
Cavillon has existed since Gallo-Roman times. During ploughing, archaeologists regularly find artifacts in the ground between the town and the place known as "The Brickyard", where a Roman villa once stood. Found under the written form "Cavellon" as early as 1166, this town was mentioned again as "Caveillon" in 1301 and appeared under its current name of "Cavillon" in 1567.

== Places of note ==
- The church of St. Nicolas, is built of stone with a low steeple covered with slates. On the apse, one can read the year 1781, but the nave is from the end of the 16th century.
- The château, near the church, in a beautiful woodland park, was built of bricks and stone in 1648. Two lower wings were added in 1698 and 1830. In the 1950s, it was the property of the Abbaye du Gard (on the left bank of the river Somme, downstream of Picquigny).
- The old school and mayor's office was built in 1868. The school closed in 1960. In 1996, the building was restored and laid out as a meeting room and commune secretary's office.
- On the other side of the D95, that crosses the town, is the 'old cemetery', surrounded by a brick wall, where rest the remains of five soldiers of the British Commonwealth.
- Chapelle Notre-Dame des Victoires, on the road leading to Oissy.

== Leisure, cultural and tourist activities ==
- The town centre has a newly laid out square with flowering plants, benches and a pétanque piste. The biggest of Cavillon's three ponds is shaded by trees and the nests of moorhens and ducks can be seen on its flowery banks.
- The attractiveness of the town of Cavillon, well maintained despite the municipal worker having to divide his time with neighbouring towns, is also attributed to the residents, encouraged by the wife of the current mayor, to grow flowers in their own gardens.
- Several walking routes pass through the commune of Cavillon, with directional panels provided by the C.C.O.A.

== See also ==
- Communes of the Somme department
