= Saint-Sauveur, Somme =

Saint-Sauveur
- Commune
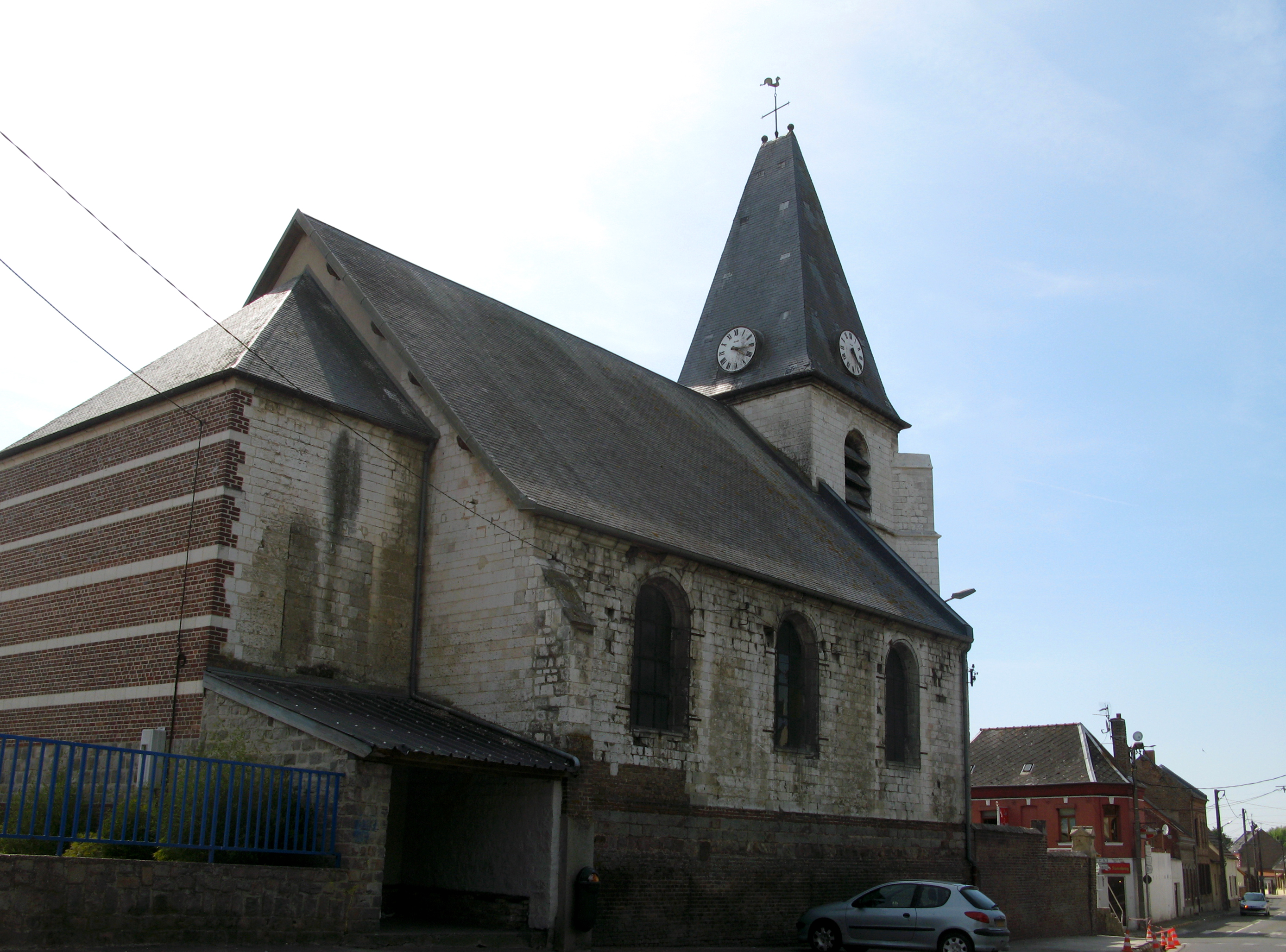
- The church in Saint-Sauveur

- Coat of arms
- Location of Saint-Sauveur
- Location within France Location within Hauts-de-France
- Coordinates: 49°56′18″N 2°12′42″E
- Country: France
- Region: Hauts-de-France
- Department: Somme
- Arrondissement: Amiens
- Canton: Ailly-sur-Somme
- Intercommunality: CC Nièvre et Somme

Government
  - Mayor (2020–2026): Gilles Delattre
- Area^{1}: 9.04 km^{2} (3.49 sq mi)
- Elevation: 45 m (148 ft)
- Highest elevation: 84 m (276 ft)
- Lowest elevation: 12 m (39 ft)
- Population (2023): 1,344
  - Density: 149/km^{2} (385/sq mi)
- Time zone: UTC+01:00 (CET)
  - Summer (DST): UTC+02:00 (CEST)
- INSEE/Postal code: 80718 /80470
- ^{1} French Land Register data, which excludes lakes, ponds, glaciers > 1 km^{2} (0.386 sq mi or 247 acres) and river estuaries.

Saint-Sauveur (French pronunciation: [sɛ̃ sovœʁ]; Picard: Saint-Sauveu) is a commune in the Somme department in Hauts-de-France in northern France.

== Geography ==
The commune is situated 3 miles (5 km) northwest of Amiens, at the D191 and D97 crossroads, by the banks of the river Somme

== Population ==
Historical population
Year	Pop.	±% p.a.
1968	1,173	—
1975	1,371	+2.25%
1982	1,410	+0.40%
1990	1,557	+1.25%
1999	1,526	−0.22%
2007	1,398	−1.09%
2012	1,453	+0.77%
2017	1,376	−1.08%
2023	1,344	−0.39%
Source: INSEE

== See also ==
- Communes of the Somme department
