= Remiencourt =

- Commune
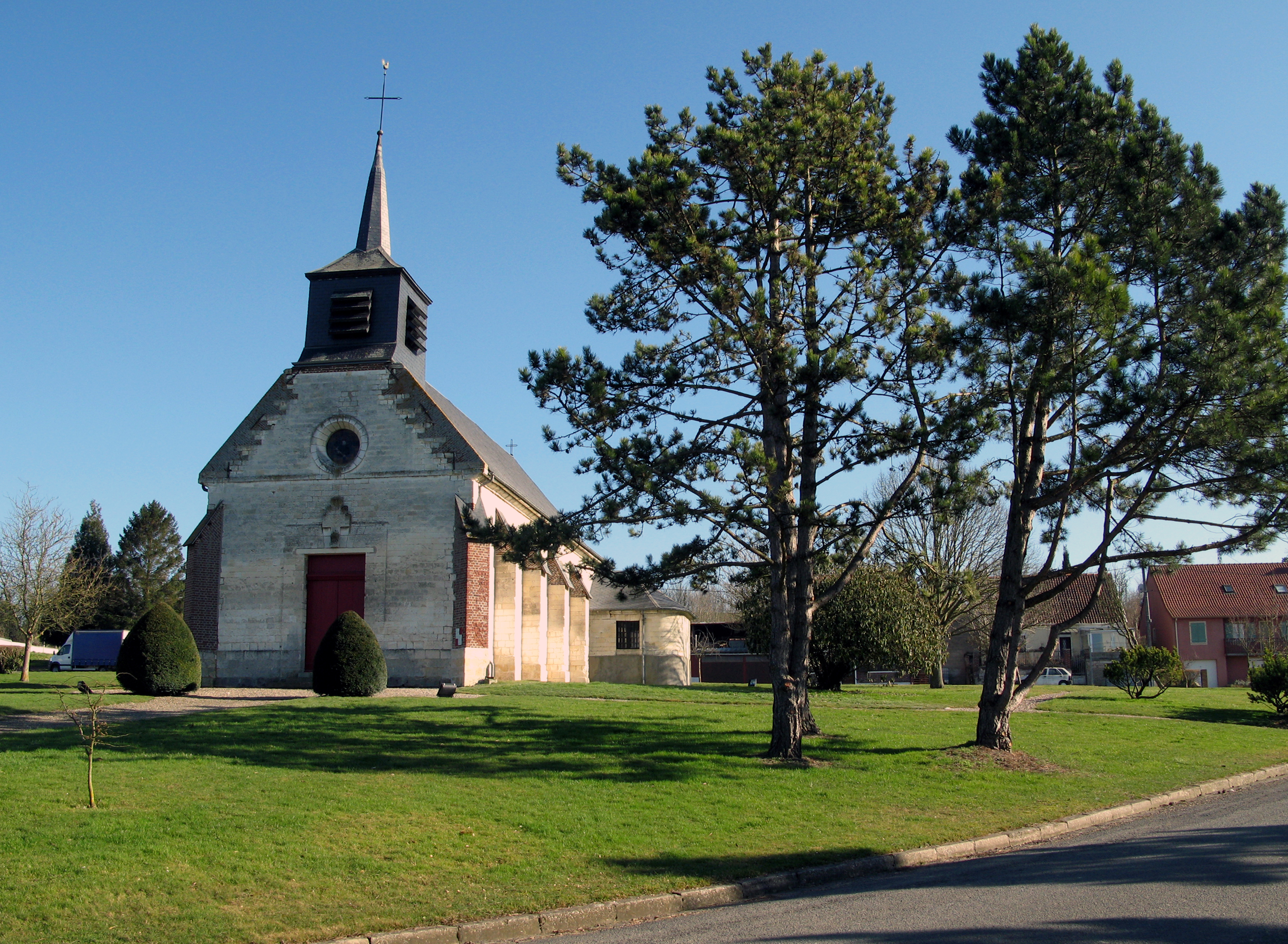
- The church in Remiencourt
- Location of Remiencourt
- Location within France Location within Hauts-de-France
- Coordinates: 49°47′01″N 2°23′01″E
- Country: France
- Region: Hauts-de-France
- Department: Somme
- Arrondissement: Amiens
- Canton: Ailly-sur-Noye
- Intercommunality: Amiens Métropole

Government
  - Mayor (2020–2026): Pascal Tonnelier
- Area^{1}: 4.82 km^{2} (1.86 sq mi)
- Elevation: 53 m (174 ft)
- Highest elevation: 114 m (374 ft)
- Lowest elevation: 37 m (121 ft)
- Population (2023): 164
  - Density: 34.0/km^{2} (88.1/sq mi)
- Time zone: UTC+01:00 (CET)
  - Summer (DST): UTC+02:00 (CEST)
- INSEE/Postal code: 80668 /80250
- ^{1} French Land Register data, which excludes lakes, ponds, glaciers > 1 km^{2} (0.386 sq mi or 247 acres) and river estuaries.

Remiencourt (French pronunciation: [ʁəmjɛ̃kuʁ]; Picard: Émiencourt) is a commune in the Somme department in Hauts-de-France in northern France.

== Geography ==
Remiencourt is situated 8 miles (13 km) south of Amiens, on the D90 road and by the banks of the river Noye.

== Places of interest ==
- The church

== See also ==
- Communes of the Somme department
