= Communauté d'agglomération Amiens Métropole =

Coordinates: 49.89°N 2.30°E

Amiens Métropole
- Communauté d'agglomération
- Location in the Somme.
- Country: France
- Region: Hauts-de-France
- Department: Somme
- No. of communes: {{{nbcomm}}}
- Established: 1999

Government
  - President: Alain Gest
- Area: 348.7 km^{2} (134.6 sq mi)
- Population (2018): 180,905
  - Density: 518.8/km^{2} (1,344/sq mi)
- Website: www.amiens.fr

The Communauté d'agglomération Amiens Métropole is a communauté d'agglomération in the Somme département and in the Hauts-de-France région of France. It was created in December 1999. Its area is 348.7 km^{2}. Its population was 180,905 in 2018, of which 133,891 were in Amiens proper.

== History ==
In 1991 a study was started by SIEPA (Syndicat Intercommunal d'Etude et de Amiénois Programming), which was the origin of Greater Amiens, established in 1994 with 18 municipalities.

Pursuant to the Chevènement Act, 2000, it was turned into a communauté d'agglomération, Amiens Métropole, which then encompassed 20 communes with the arrival of Allonville and Bertangles.

Since then, Amiens Métropole has continued to add more communes: 2003, with 21 municipalities, 2004 with 27 municipalities, and in 2007, 33 municipalities. In January 2018, it was expanded with 6 more communes from the Communauté de communes du Territoire Nord Picardie and the Communauté de communes Nièvre et Somme to 39 communes.

== Composition ==
The communauté d'agglomération consists of the following 39 communes:

1. Allonville
2. Amiens
3. Bertangles
4. Blangy-Tronville
5. Bovelles
6. Boves
7. Cagny
8. Camon
9. Cardonnette
10. Clairy-Saulchoix
11. Creuse
12. Dreuil-lès-Amiens
13. Dury
14. Estrées-sur-Noye
15. Ferrières
16. Glisy
17. Grattepanche
18. Guignemicourt
19. Hébécourt
20. Longueau
21. Pissy
22. Pont-de-Metz
23. Poulainville
24. Querrieu
25. Remiencourt
26. Revelles
27. Rivery
28. Rumigny
29. Sains-en-Amiénois
30. Saint-Fuscien
31. Saint-Sauflieu
32. Saint-Vaast-en-Chaussée
33. Saleux
34. Salouël
35. Saveuse
36. Seux
37. Thézy-Glimont
38. Vaux-en-Amiénois
39. Vers-sur-Selle

== Responsibilities ==
- Action for Economic Development (Support for industrial, commercial or employment, support agricultural and forestry activities)
- Action to promote housing for the disadvantaged
- Advocacy
- Sanitation
- Waste Collection and household treatment
- Construction and development, maintenance and management of equipment or cultural institutions, socio-cultural, socio-educational, sports
- Design, development and maintenance of the roads
- Design, development, maintenance and management of business areas (industrial, commercial, service, craft or tourist)
- Design, development, maintenance and management of port or airport activities
- Crematorium
- Contractual urban development, community development and economic and social integration
- Local crime prevention
- Water (treatment, supply, distribution)
- Research and Programming
- Noise control
- IT networking (Internet, cable)
- Operation scheduled for improving habitat (OPAH)
- Urban Transport Organization
- Housing policy
- Agenda local housing
- Protection and enhancement of the environment
- Air Quality
- Tourism
- Waste processing

== Tax and budget ==
The community is financed by the single business tax (15.27% 2006), which replaces the taxes once payable by the member communes.

== See also ==
- Communes of the Somme department
