= Canton of Ailly-sur-Somme =

Coordinates: 49.92°N 2.20°E

The canton of Ailly-sur-Somme is an administrative division of the Somme department, in northern France. It was created at the French canton reorganisation which came into effect in March 2015. Its seat is in Ailly-sur-Somme.

It consists of the following communes:

- Ailly-sur-Somme
- Airaines
- Argœuves
- Avelesges
- Belloy-sur-Somme
- Bougainville
- Bourdon
- Bovelles
- Breilly
- Briquemesnil-Floxicourt
- Camps-en-Amiénois
- Cavillon
- La Chaussée-Tirancourt
- Clairy-Saulchoix
- Creuse
- Crouy-Saint-Pierre
- Dreuil-lès-Amiens
- Ferrières
- Fluy
- Fourdrinoy
- Fresnoy-au-Val
- Guignemicourt
- Hangest-sur-Somme
- Laleu
- Le Mesge
- Métigny
- Molliens-Dreuil
- Montagne-Fayel
- Oissy
- Picquigny
- Pissy
- Quesnoy-sur-Airaines
- Quevauvillers
- Revelles
- Riencourt
- Saint-Aubin-Montenoy
- Saint-Sauveur
- Saisseval
- Saveuse
- Seux
- Soues
- Tailly
- Warlus
- Yzeux
