= Allonville =

Commune in Hauts-de-France, France

- Commune
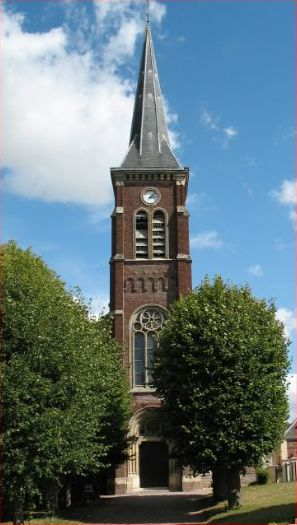
- The church in Allonville
- Location of Allonville
- Location within France Location within Hauts-de-France
- Coordinates: 49°56′29″N 2°21′48″E
- Country: France
- Region: Hauts-de-France
- Department: Somme
- Arrondissement: Amiens
- Canton: Amiens-2
- Intercommunality: CA Amiens Métropole

Government
  - Mayor (2020–2026): Audrey Boché
- Area^{1}: 10.37 km^{2} (4.00 sq mi)
- Elevation: 70 m (230 ft)
- Highest elevation: 114 m (374 ft)
- Lowest elevation: 59 m (194 ft)
- Population (2023): 778
  - Density: 75.0/km^{2} (194/sq mi)
- Time zone: UTC+01:00 (CET)
  - Summer (DST): UTC+02:00 (CEST)
- INSEE/Postal code: 80020 /80260
- ^{1} French Land Register data, which excludes lakes, ponds, glaciers > 1 km^{2} (0.386 sq mi or 247 acres) and river estuaries.

Allonville (French pronunciation: [alɔ̃vil]) is a commune in the Somme department in Hauts-de-France in northern France.

== Geography ==
The commune is situated 3 miles (5 km) north of Amiens at the D919 and D247 junction .

== Population ==
Historical population
Year	Pop.	±% p.a.
1968	318	—
1975	334	+0.70%
1982	453	+4.45%
1990	560	+2.69%
1999	572	+0.24%
2007	591	+0.41%
2012	747	+4.80%
2017	738	−0.24%
2023	778	+0.88%
Source: INSEE

== See also ==
Communes of the Somme department
