= Saveuse =

- Commune
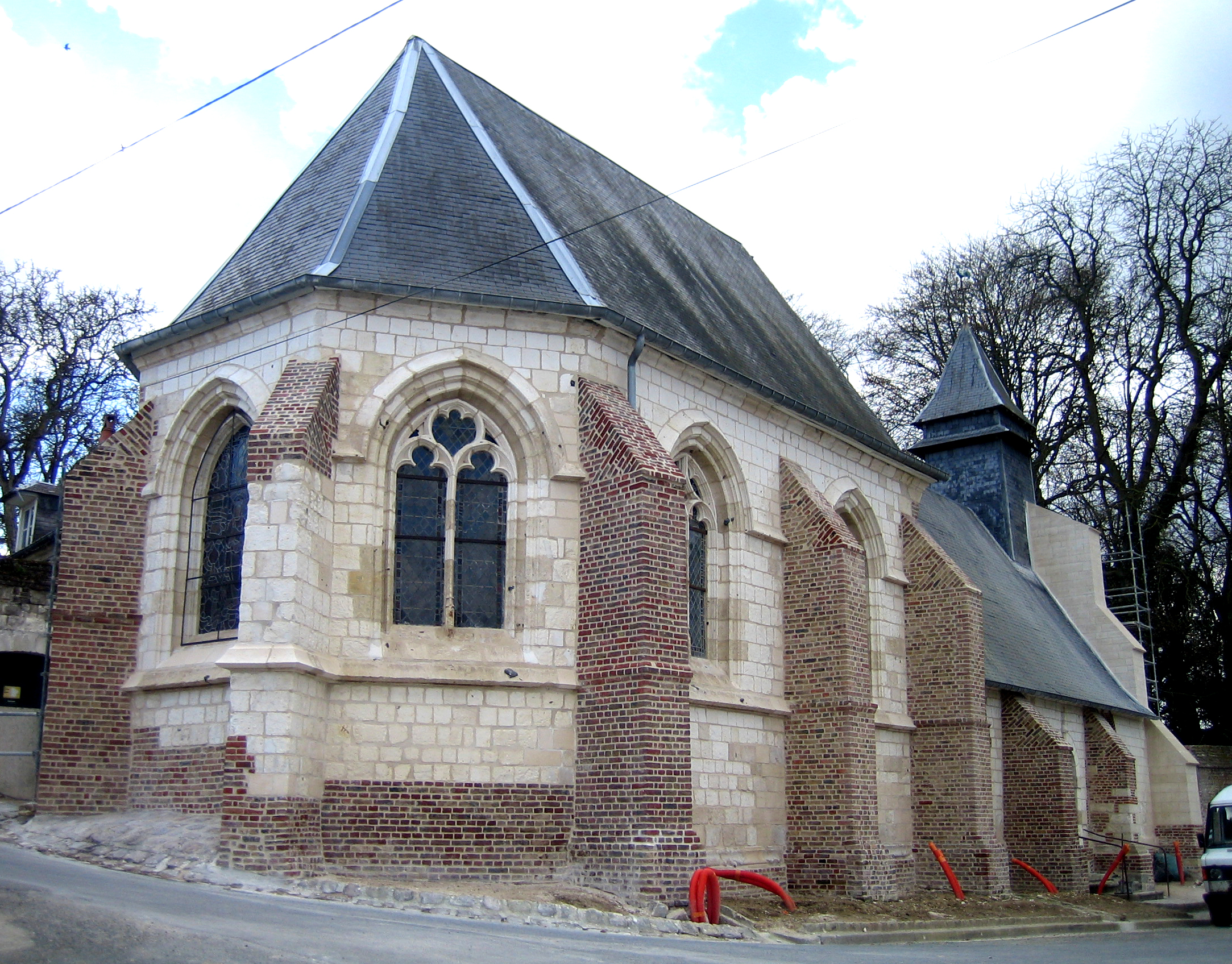
- The church in Saveuse

- Coat of arms
- Location of Saveuse
- Location within France Location within Hauts-de-France
- Coordinates: 49°54′02″N 2°13′06″E
- Country: France
- Region: Hauts-de-France
- Department: Somme
- Arrondissement: Amiens
- Canton: Ailly-sur-Somme
- Intercommunality: Amiens Métropole

Government
  - Mayor (2020–2026): Georges Dufour
- Area^{1}: 3.99 km^{2} (1.54 sq mi)
- Elevation: 80 m (260 ft)
- Highest elevation: 105 m (344 ft)
- Lowest elevation: 39 m (128 ft)
- Population (2023): 1,096
  - Density: 275/km^{2} (711/sq mi)
- Time zone: UTC+01:00 (CET)
  - Summer (DST): UTC+02:00 (CEST)
- INSEE/Postal code: 80730 /80470
- ^{1} French Land Register data, which excludes lakes, ponds, glaciers > 1 km^{2} (0.386 sq mi or 247 acres) and river estuaries.

Saveuse (French pronunciation: [savøz]) is a commune in the Somme department in Hauts-de-France in northern France.

== Geography ==
Saveuse is situated 3 miles (5 km) west of Amiens, on the D211 road

== Population ==
Historical population
Year	Pop.	±% p.a.
1968	355	—
1975	604	+7.89%
1982	858	+5.14%
1990	864	+0.09%
1999	776	−1.19%
2007	719	−0.95%
2012	810	+2.41%
2017	932	+2.85%
2023	1,096	+2.74%
Source: INSEE

== Places of interest ==
- The church

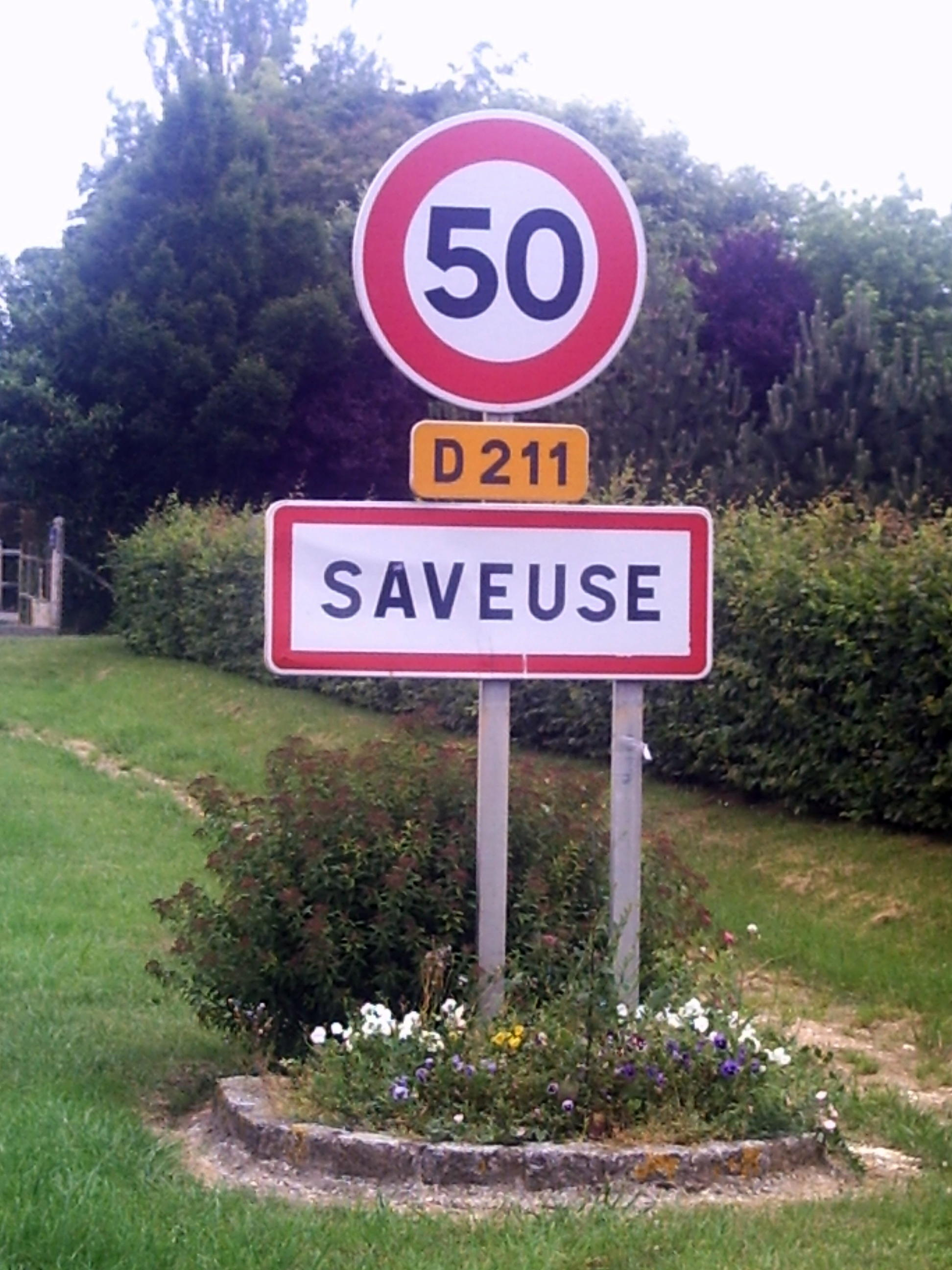
At the entrance to the commune

== See also ==
- Communes of the Somme department
