= Riencourt =

- Commune
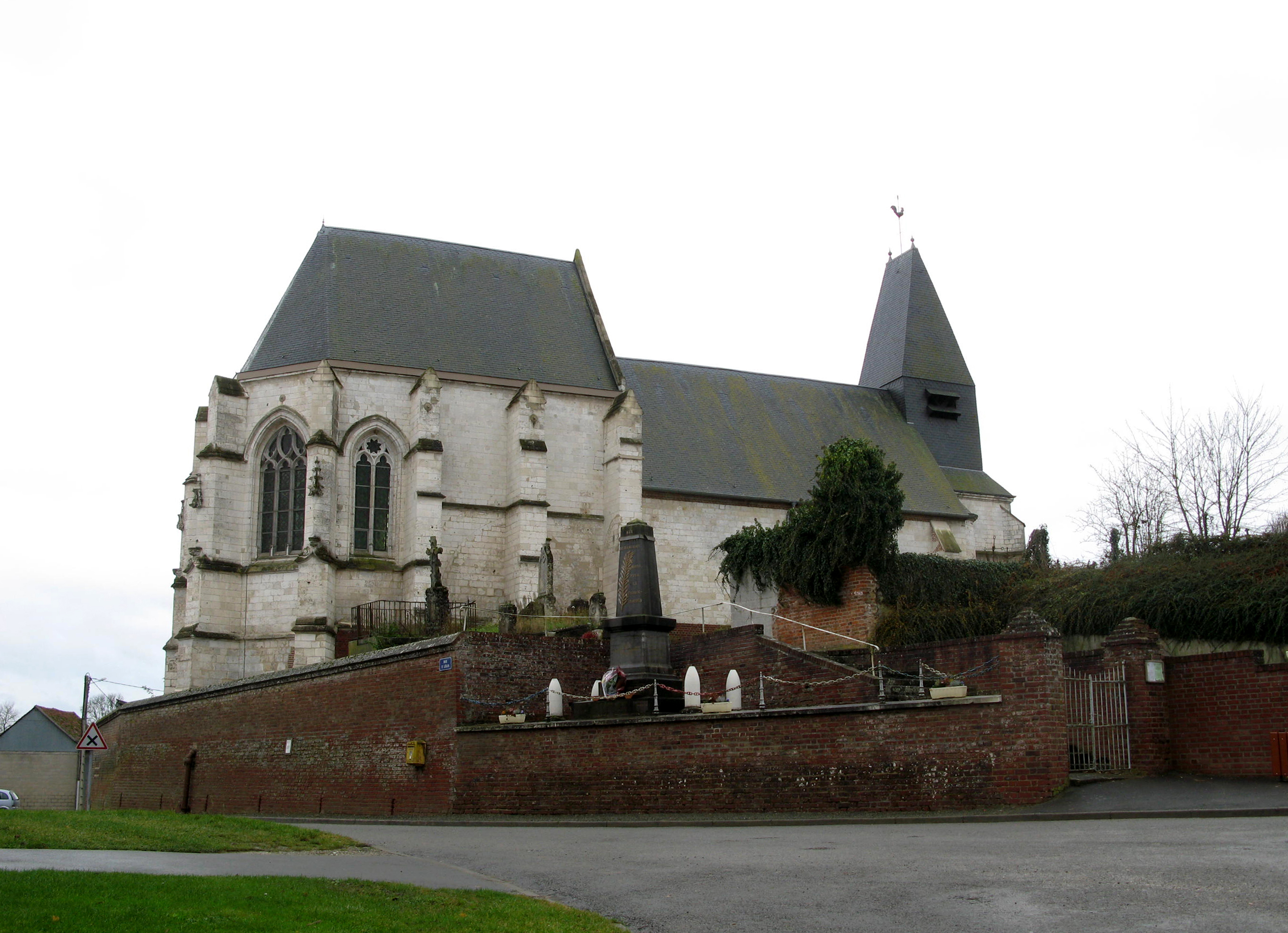
- The church in Riencourt

- Coat of arms
- Location of Riencourt
- Location within France Location within Hauts-de-France
- Coordinates: 49°55′21″N 2°03′39″E
- Country: France
- Region: Hauts-de-France
- Department: Somme
- Arrondissement: Amiens
- Canton: Ailly-sur-Somme
- Intercommunality: CC Somme Sud-Ouest

Government
  - Mayor (2020–2026): Gaël Caux
- Area^{1}: 10.16 km^{2} (3.92 sq mi)
- Elevation: 75 m (246 ft)
- Highest elevation: 124 m (407 ft)
- Lowest elevation: 28 m (92 ft)
- Population (2023): 181
  - Density: 17.8/km^{2} (46.1/sq mi)
- Time zone: UTC+01:00 (CET)
  - Summer (DST): UTC+02:00 (CEST)
- INSEE/Postal code: 80673 /80310
- ^{1} French Land Register data, which excludes lakes, ponds, glaciers > 1 km^{2} (0.386 sq mi or 247 acres) and river estuaries.

Riencourt (French pronunciation: [ʁjɛ̃kuʁ]) is a commune in the Somme department in Hauts-de-France in northern France.

== Geography ==
Riencourt is situated 15 miles (24 km) northwest of Amiens, on the D121 and D69 crossroads.

== Population ==
Historical population
Year	Pop.	±% p.a.
1968	224	—
1975	213	−0.72%
1982	203	−0.68%
1990	216	+0.78%
1999	196	−1.07%
2007	165	−2.13%
2012	193	+3.18%
2017	178	−1.61%
2023	181	+0.28%
Source: INSEE

== See also ==
- Communes of the Somme department
