= Quesnoy-sur-Airaines =

- Commune
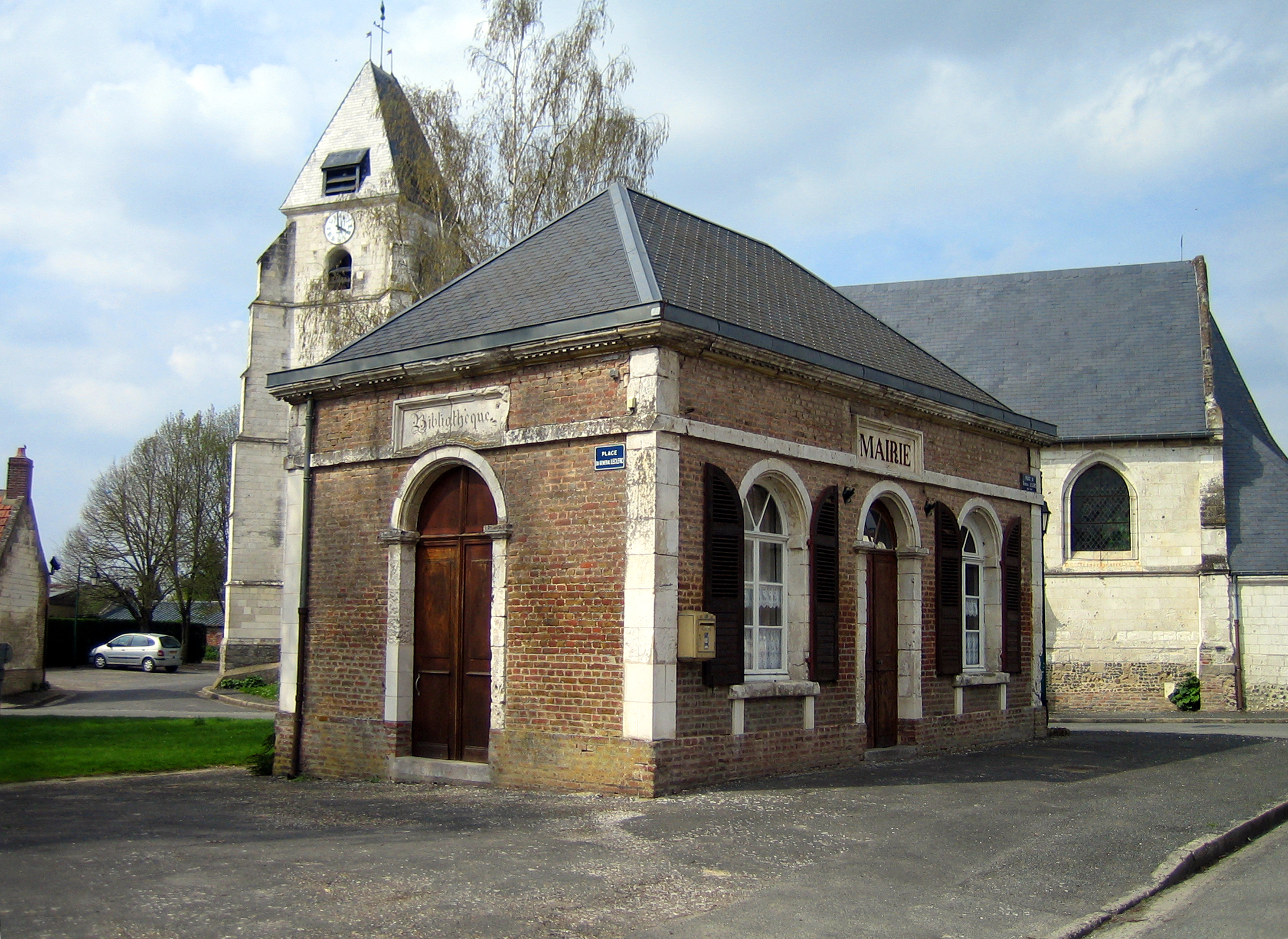
- Town hall
- Location of Quesnoy-sur-Airaines
- Location within France Location within Hauts-de-France
- Coordinates: 49°57′24″N 1°59′30″E
- Country: France
- Region: Hauts-de-France
- Department: Somme
- Arrondissement: Amiens
- Canton: Ailly-sur-Somme
- Intercommunality: CC Somme Sud-Ouest

Government
  - Mayor (2020–2026): Jean-Marie Snauwaert
- Area^{1}: 16.14 km^{2} (6.23 sq mi)
- Elevation: 80 m (260 ft)
- Highest elevation: 124 m (407 ft)
- Lowest elevation: 50 m (160 ft)
- Population (2023): 427
  - Density: 26.5/km^{2} (68.5/sq mi)
- Time zone: UTC+01:00 (CET)
  - Summer (DST): UTC+02:00 (CEST)
- INSEE/Postal code: 80655 /80270
- ^{1} French Land Register data, which excludes lakes, ponds, glaciers > 1 km^{2} (0.386 sq mi or 247 acres) and river estuaries.

Quesnoy-sur-Airaines (French pronunciation: [kenwa syʁ ɛʁɛn], literally Quesnoy on Airaines) is a commune in the Somme department in Hauts-de-France in northern France.

== Geography ==
The commune is situated on the D936 road, some 14 miles (23 km) northwest of Amiens.

== Population ==
Historical population
Year	Pop.	±% p.a.
1968	444	—
1975	452	+0.26%
1982	433	−0.61%
1990	438	+0.14%
1999	444	+0.15%
2007	473	+0.79%
2012	442	−1.35%
2017	441	−0.05%
2023	427	−0.54%
Source: INSEE

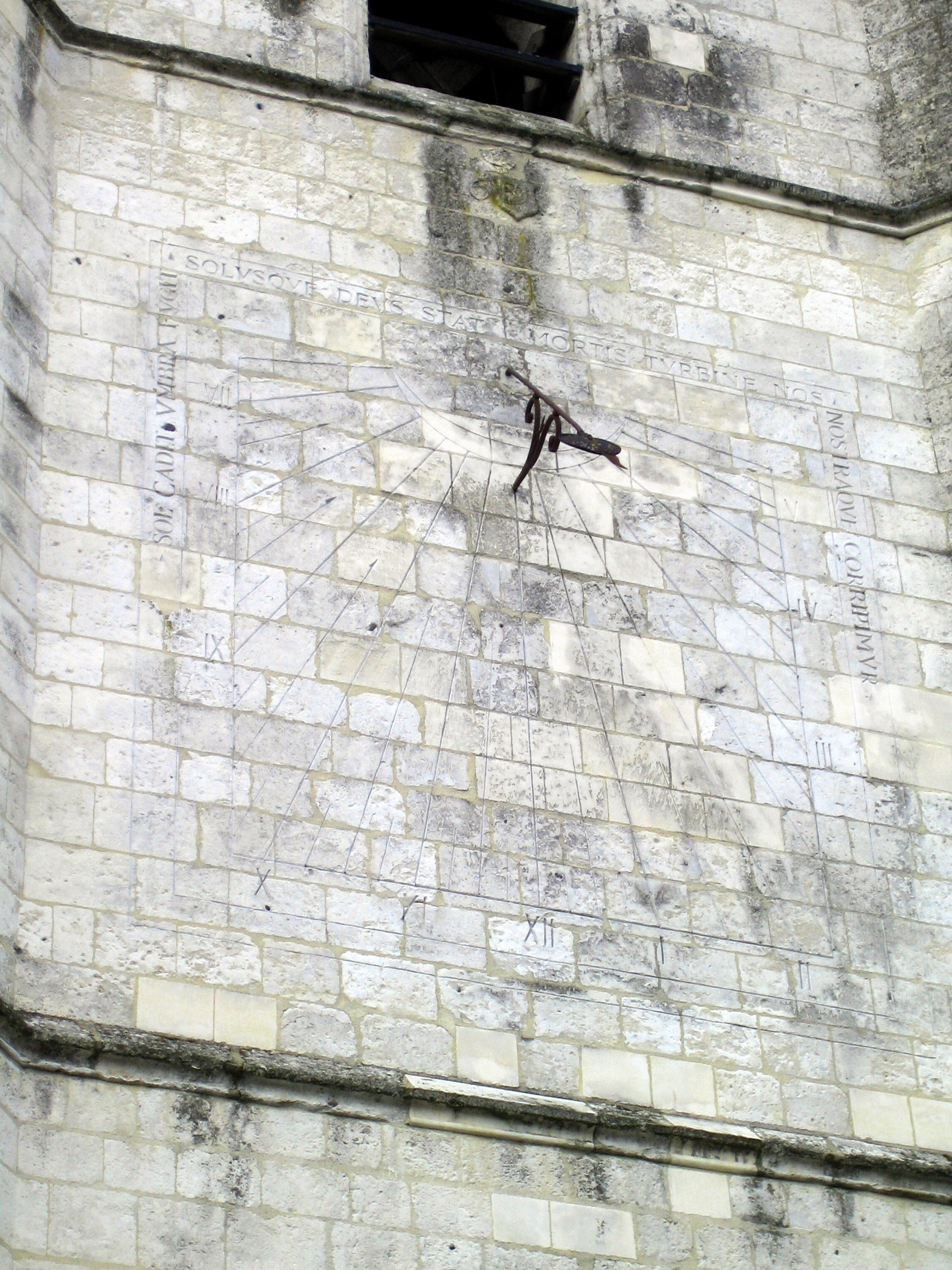
The sundial on the church

== See also ==
- Communes of the Somme department
