= Guignemicourt =

- Commune
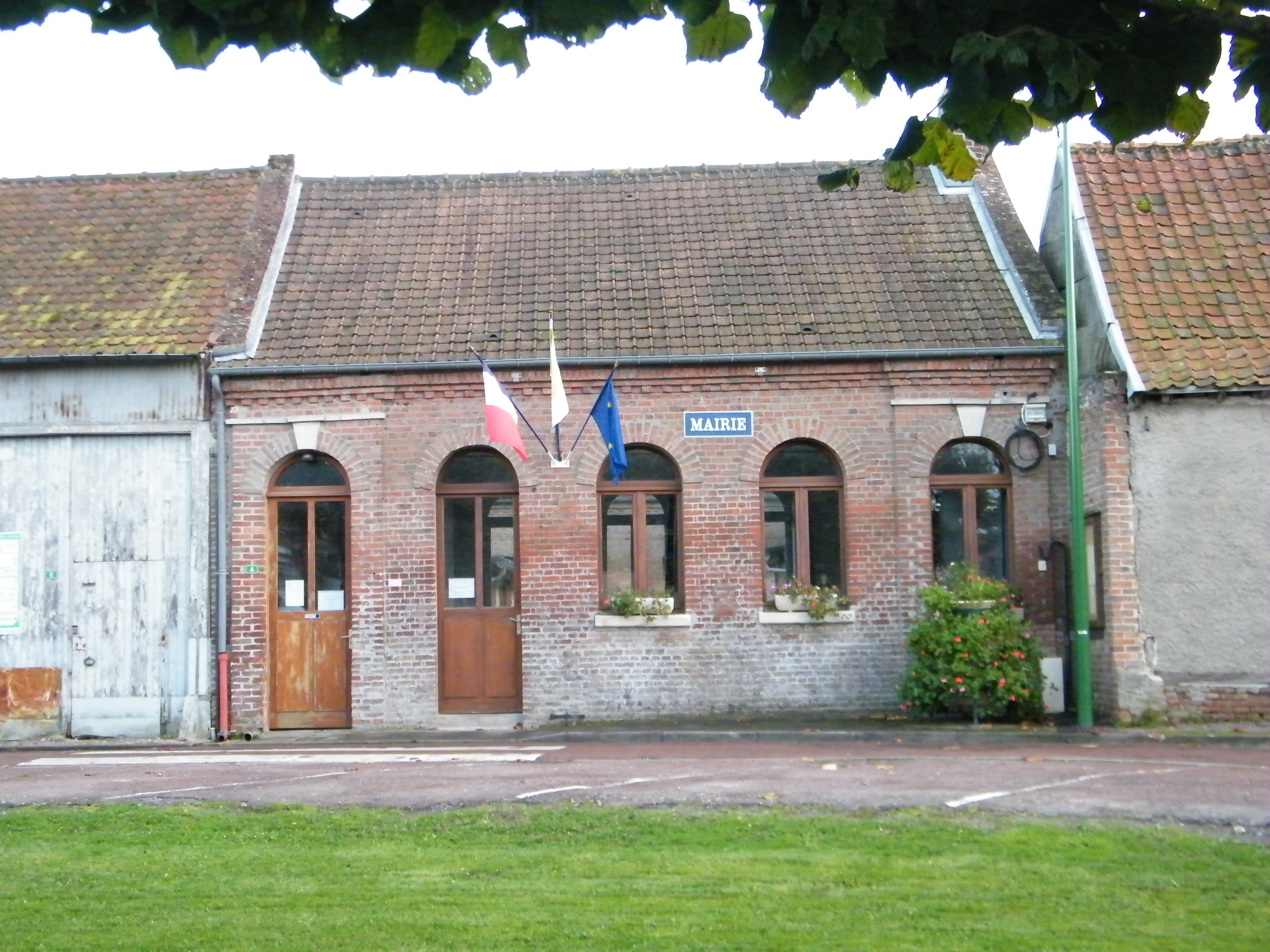
- The town hall in Guignemicourt
- Location of Guignemicourt
- Location within France Location within Hauts-de-France
- Coordinates: 49°52′15″N 2°10′32″E
- Country: France
- Region: Hauts-de-France
- Department: Somme
- Arrondissement: Amiens
- Canton: Ailly-sur-Somme
- Intercommunality: Amiens Métropole

Government
  - Mayor (2020–2026): Daniel Abet
- Area^{1}: 4.48 km^{2} (1.73 sq mi)
- Elevation: 106 m (348 ft)
- Highest elevation: 117 m (384 ft)
- Lowest elevation: 74 m (243 ft)
- Population (2023): 386
  - Density: 86.2/km^{2} (223/sq mi)
- Time zone: UTC+01:00 (CET)
  - Summer (DST): UTC+02:00 (CEST)
- INSEE/Postal code: 80399 /80540
- ^{1} French Land Register data, which excludes lakes, ponds, glaciers > 1 km^{2} (0.386 sq mi or 247 acres) and river estuaries.

Guignemicourt (French pronunciation: [ɡiɲmikuʁ]; Picard: Djimicourt) is a commune in the Somme department in Hauts-de-France in northern France.

== Geography ==
Guignemicourt is situated 6 miles (10 km) southwest of Amiens on the D189 road and very close to the A29 autoroute.

== Population ==
Historical population
Year	Pop.	±% p.a.
1968	201	—
1975	187	−1.03%
1982	216	+2.08%
1990	250	+1.84%
1999	245	−0.22%
2007	243	−0.10%
2012	246	+0.25%
2017	360	+7.91%
2023	386	+1.17%
Source: INSEE

== See also ==
- Communes of the Somme department
