= Briquemesnil-Floxicourt =

- Commune
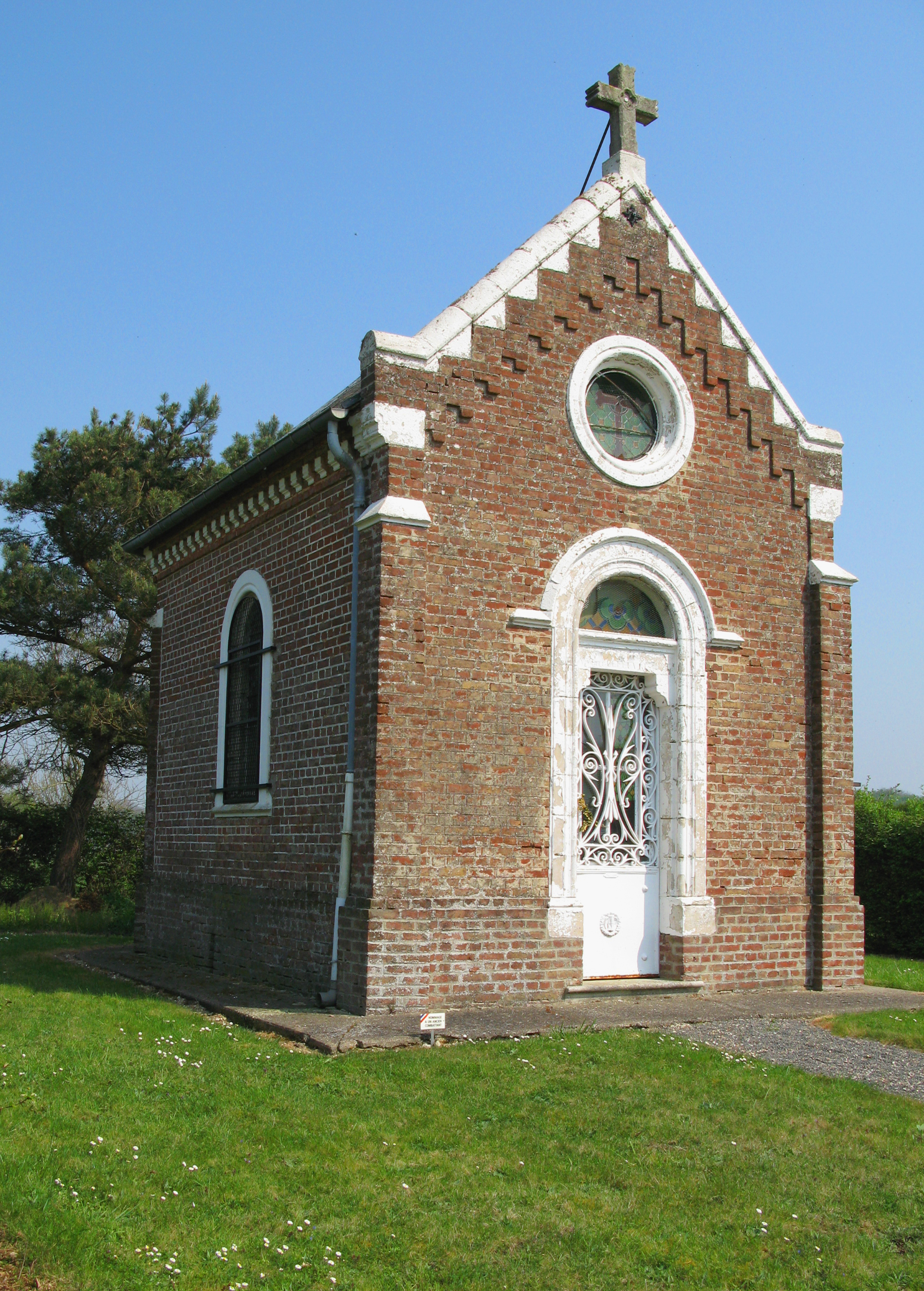
- The chapel by the cemetery in Briquemesnil
- Location of Briquemesnil-Floxicourt
- Location within France Location within Hauts-de-France
- Coordinates: 49°53′07″N 2°05′14″E
- Country: France
- Region: Hauts-de-France
- Department: Somme
- Arrondissement: Amiens
- Canton: Ailly-sur-Somme
- Intercommunality: CC Somme Sud-Ouest

Government
  - Mayor (2020–2026): Jean-Jacques Stoter
- Area^{1}: 7.35 km^{2} (2.84 sq mi)
- Elevation: 115 m (377 ft)
- Highest elevation: 126 m (413 ft)
- Lowest elevation: 53 m (174 ft)
- Population (2023): 341
  - Density: 46.4/km^{2} (120/sq mi)
- Time zone: UTC+01:00 (CET)
  - Summer (DST): UTC+02:00 (CEST)
- INSEE/Postal code: 80142 /80540
- ^{1} French Land Register data, which excludes lakes, ponds, glaciers > 1 km^{2} (0.386 sq mi or 247 acres) and river estuaries.

Briquemesnil-Floxicourt (French pronunciation: [bʁikmenil flɔksikuʁ]; Picard: Bricmangni-Tchot Flichcourt) is a commune in the Somme department in Hauts-de-France in northern France.

== Geography ==
The communes is situated on the D211 road, some 15 miles (24 km) west of Amiens.

== Population ==
Historical population
Year	Pop.	±% p.a.
1968	136	—
1975	143	+0.72%
1982	173	+2.76%
1990	182	+0.64%
1999	153	−1.91%
2007	159	+0.48%
2012	181	+2.63%
2017	269	+8.25%
2023	341	+4.03%
Source: INSEE

== See also ==
- Communes of the Somme department
