= Seux =

- Commune
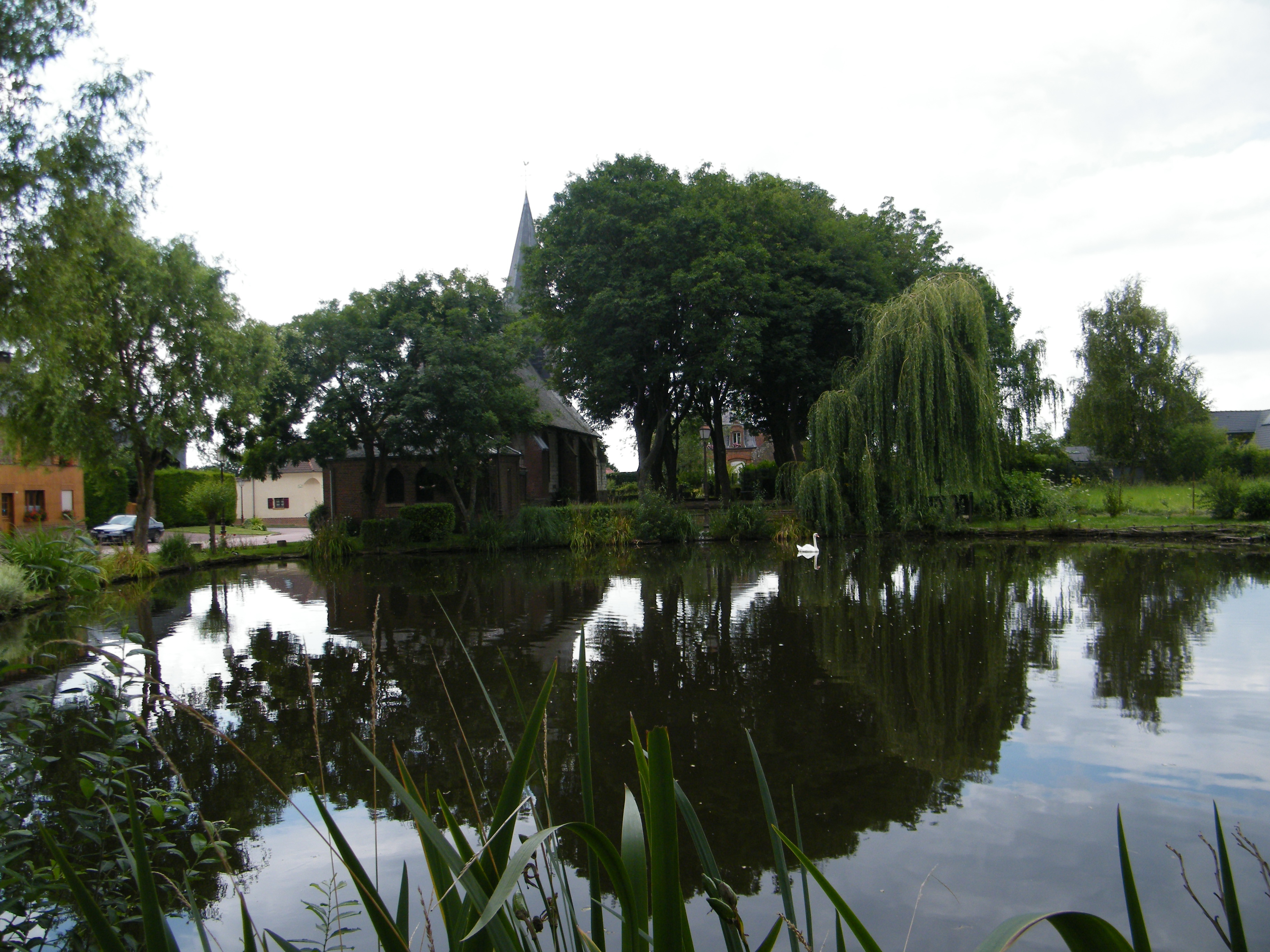
- The lake in Seux

- Coat of arms
- Location of Seux
- Location within France Location within Hauts-de-France
- Coordinates: 49°52′27″N 2°06′28″E
- Country: France
- Region: Hauts-de-France
- Department: Somme
- Arrondissement: Amiens
- Canton: Ailly-sur-Somme
- Intercommunality: CA Amiens Métropole

Government
  - Mayor (2020–2026): Valérie Rose Tetu
- Area^{1}: 3.53 km^{2} (1.36 sq mi)
- Elevation: 130 m (430 ft)
- Highest elevation: 126 m (413 ft)
- Lowest elevation: 80 m (260 ft)
- Population (2023): 162
  - Density: 45.9/km^{2} (119/sq mi)
- Time zone: UTC+01:00 (CET)
  - Summer (DST): UTC+02:00 (CEST)
- INSEE/Postal code: 80735 /80540
- ^{1} French Land Register data, which excludes lakes, ponds, glaciers > 1 km^{2} (0.386 sq mi or 247 acres) and river estuaries.

Seux (French pronunciation: [sø]) is a commune in the Somme department in Hauts-de-France in northern France.

== Geography ==
Seux is situated 7 miles (11 km) southwest of Amiens, on the D95e road.

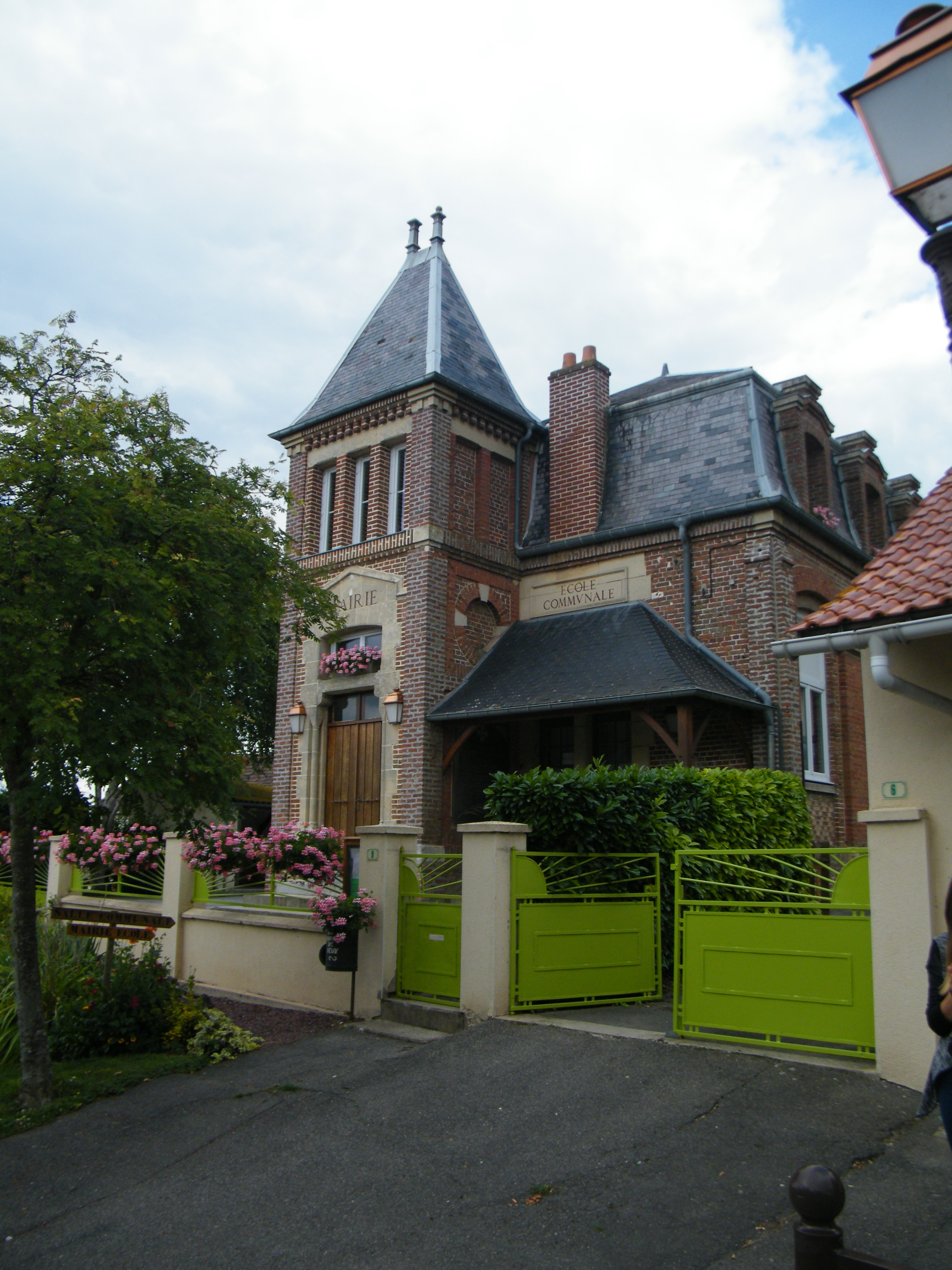
Town hall and school.

== Population ==
Historical population
Year	Pop.	±% p.a.
1968	117	—
1975	148	+3.41%
1982	168	+1.83%
1990	162	−0.45%
1999	158	−0.28%
2007	164	+0.47%
2012	167	+0.36%
2017	168	+0.12%
2023	162	−0.60%
Source: INSEE

== See also ==
- Communes of the Somme department
