= Revelles =

- Commune
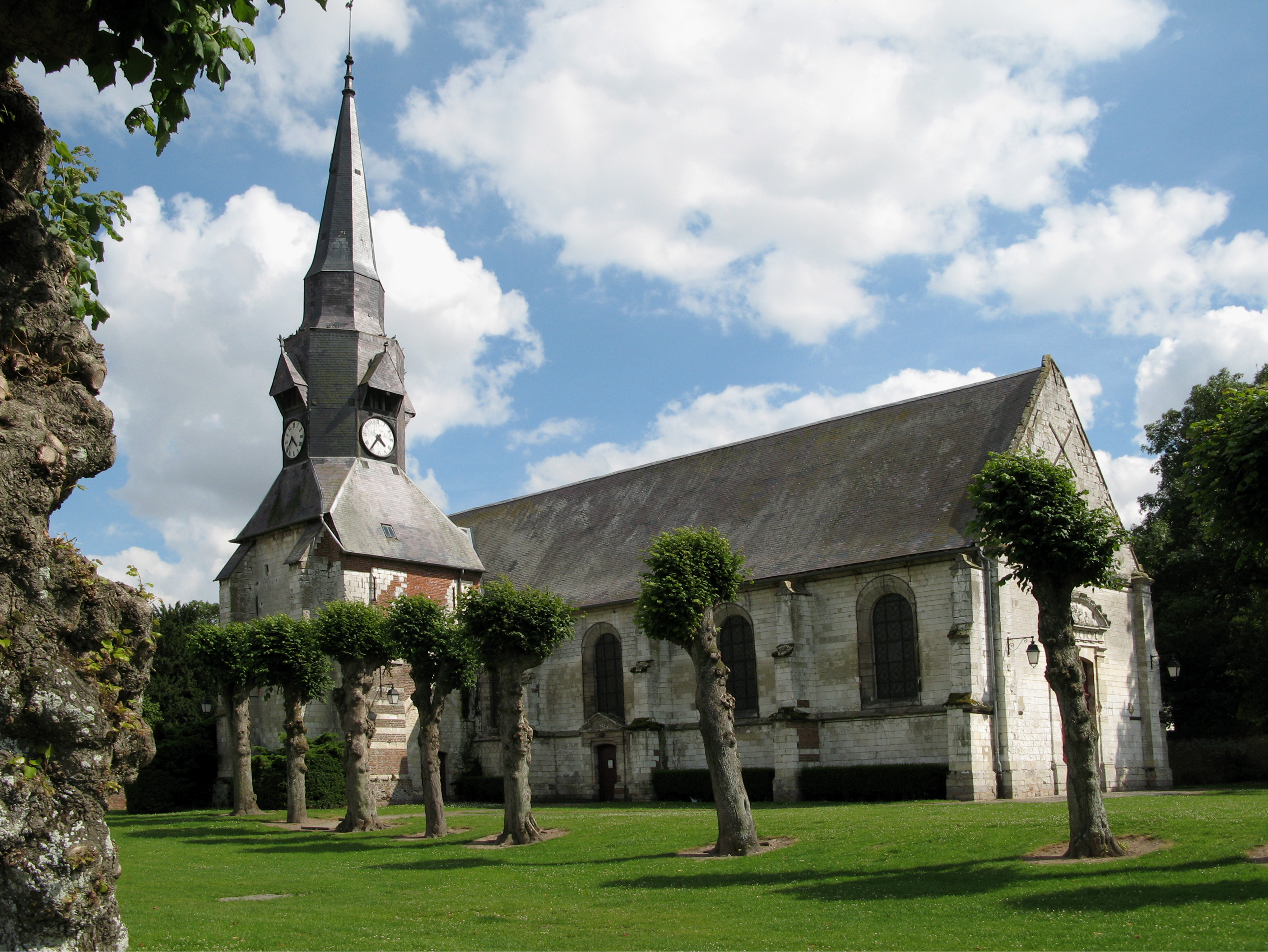
- The church in Revelles
- Location of Revelles
- Location within France Location within Hauts-de-France
- Coordinates: 49°50′58″N 2°07′19″E
- Country: France
- Region: Hauts-de-France
- Department: Somme
- Arrondissement: Amiens
- Canton: Ailly-sur-Somme
- Intercommunality: Amiens Métropole

Government
  - Mayor (2020–2026): Jean-Marc Jovelet
- Area^{1}: 14.41 km^{2} (5.56 sq mi)
- Elevation: 117 m (384 ft)
- Highest elevation: 133 m (436 ft)
- Lowest elevation: 71 m (233 ft)
- Population (2023): 530
  - Density: 37/km^{2} (95/sq mi)
- Time zone: UTC+01:00 (CET)
  - Summer (DST): UTC+02:00 (CEST)
- INSEE/Postal code: 80670 /80540
- ^{1} French Land Register data, which excludes lakes, ponds, glaciers > 1 km^{2} (0.386 sq mi or 247 acres) and river estuaries.

Revelles is a commune in the Somme department in Hauts-de-France in northern France.

== Geography ==
Revelles is situated around 8 miles (13 km) southwest of Amiens, on the D51 and D97 crossroads.

== Population ==
Historical population
| Year | Pop. | ±% p.a. |
|---|---|---|
| 1968 | 346 | — |
| 1975 | 362 | +0.65% |
| 1982 | 396 | +1.29% |
| 1990 | 466 | +2.06% |
| 1999 | 506 | +0.92% |
| 2007 | 537 | +0.75% |
| 2012 | 547 | +0.37% |
| 2017 | 515 | −1.20% |
| 2023 | 530 | +0.48% |
Source: INSEE

== History ==
A Gallo-Roman settlement was unearthed within the confines of the commune, during the construction of the A29 motorway.

== Places of interest ==
- The church
- The mairie
- A war memorial
- Some stone wells

== See also ==
- Communes of the Somme department
