= Fluy =

- Commune
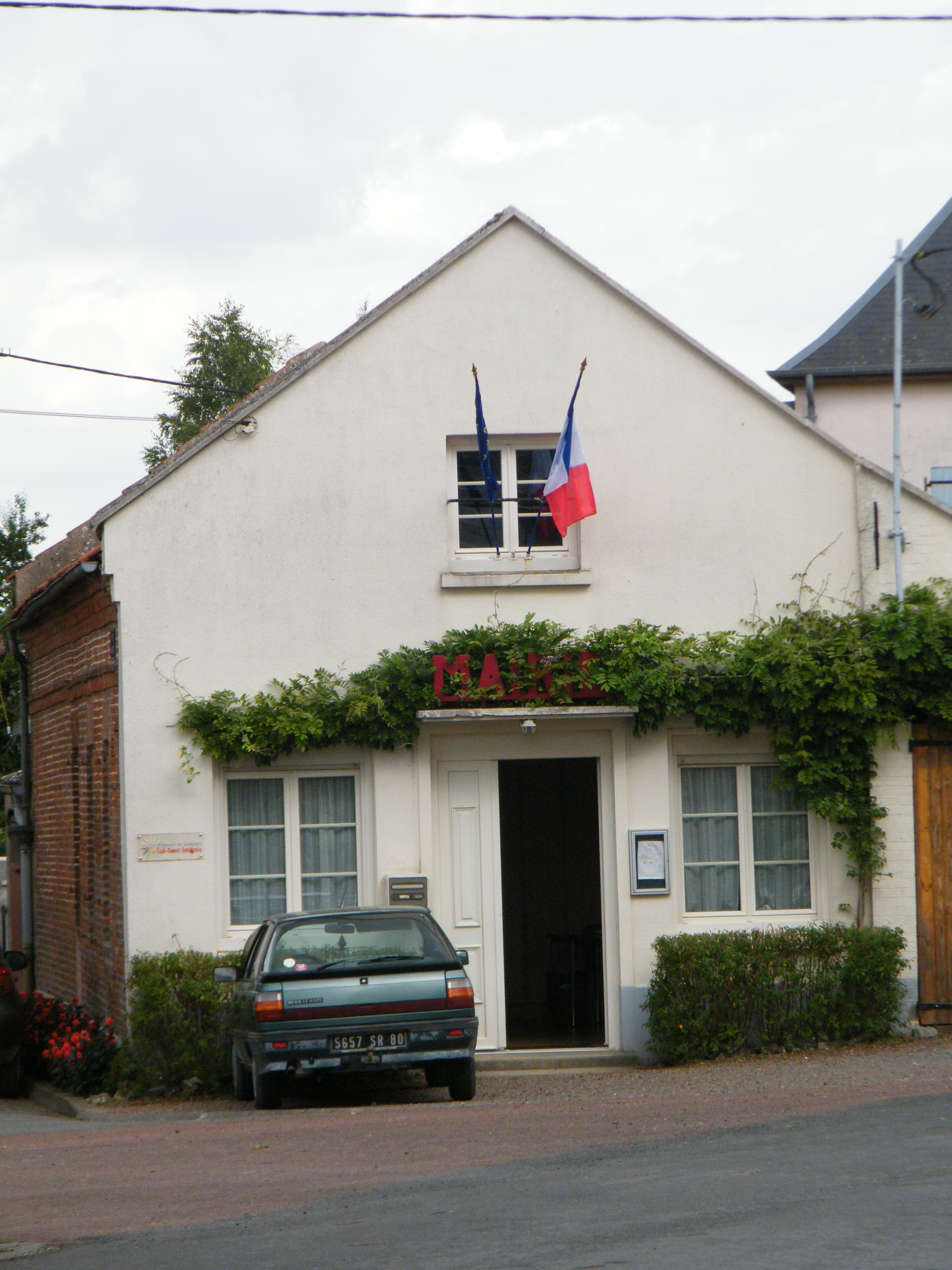
- The town hall in Fluy
- Location of Fluy
- Location within France Location within Hauts-de-France
- Coordinates: 49°51′32″N 2°05′53″E
- Country: France
- Region: Hauts-de-France
- Department: Somme
- Arrondissement: Amiens
- Canton: Ailly-sur-Somme
- Intercommunality: CC Somme Sud-Ouest

Government
  - Mayor (2023–2026): Françoise Deverité
- Area^{1}: 6.38 km^{2} (2.46 sq mi)
- Elevation: 127 m (417 ft)
- Highest elevation: 131 m (430 ft)
- Lowest elevation: 68 m (223 ft)
- Population (2023): 320
  - Density: 50/km^{2} (130/sq mi)
- Time zone: UTC+01:00 (CET)
  - Summer (DST): UTC+02:00 (CEST)
- INSEE/Postal code: 80319 /80540
- ^{1} French Land Register data, which excludes lakes, ponds, glaciers > 1 km^{2} (0.386 sq mi or 247 acres) and river estuaries.

Fluy (French pronunciation: [flɥi]) is a commune in the Somme department in Hauts-de-France in northern France.

== Geography ==
Fluy is situated on a plateau, at the junction of the D182 and D95 roads, some 7 miles (11 km) southwest of Amiens.

== History ==
The name is recorded in 1066 under the name Floy, in 1638 as Flenuy and in 1657 as the variant Fleuny .

== Population ==
Historical population
Year	Pop.	±% p.a.
1968	252	—
1975	256	+0.23%
1982	304	+2.49%
1990	355	+1.96%
1999	332	−0.74%
2007	307	−0.97%
2012	311	+0.26%
2017	332	+1.32%
2023	320	−0.61%
Source: INSEE

In 1698, the population was 500.

== Places of interest ==
The church of Saint Marie-Madeleine

== See also ==
- Communes of the Somme department
