= Camps-en-Amiénois =

- Commune
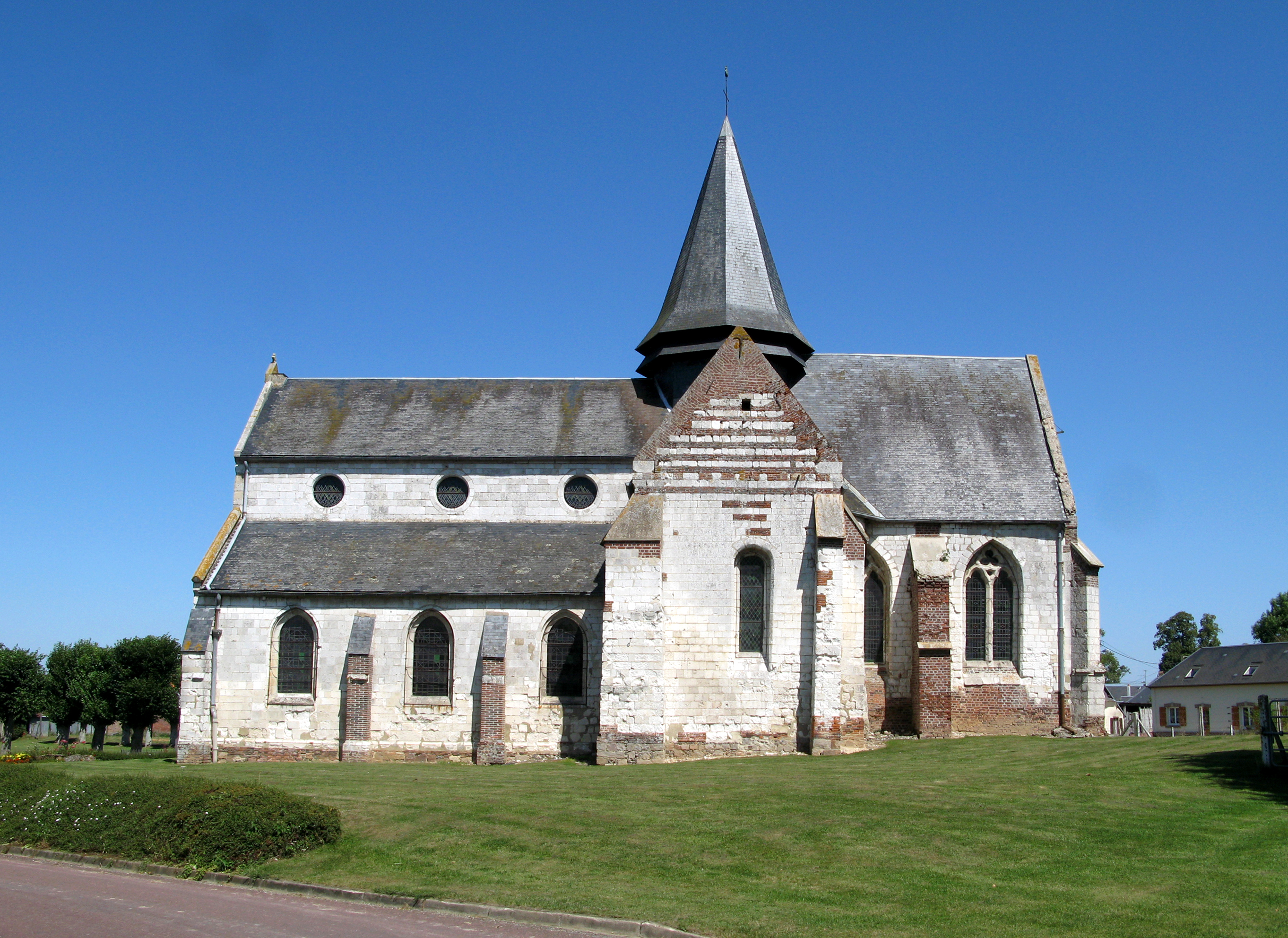
- The church in Camps-en-Amiénois

- Coat of arms
- Location of Camps-en-Amiénois
- Location within France Location within Hauts-de-France
- Coordinates: 49°52′51″N 1°58′12″E
- Country: France
- Region: Hauts-de-France
- Department: Somme
- Arrondissement: Amiens
- Canton: Ailly-sur-Somme
- Intercommunality: CC Somme Sud-Ouest

Government
  - Mayor (2020–2026): Linda Bon
- Area^{1}: 4.54 km^{2} (1.75 sq mi)
- Elevation: 120 m (390 ft)
- Highest elevation: 129 m (423 ft)
- Lowest elevation: 85 m (279 ft)
- Population (2023): 182
  - Density: 40.1/km^{2} (104/sq mi)
- Time zone: UTC+01:00 (CET)
  - Summer (DST): UTC+02:00 (CEST)
- INSEE/Postal code: 80165 /80540
- ^{1} French Land Register data, which excludes lakes, ponds, glaciers > 1 km^{2} (0.386 sq mi or 247 acres) and river estuaries.

Camps-en-Amiénois (French pronunciation: [kɑ̃ ɑ̃.n‿amjenwa], lit. 'Camps in Amiénois'; Picard: Camp-in-Anmiénoé) is a commune in the Somme department in Hauts-de-France in northern France.

== Geography ==
The commune is situated at the D211 and D901 crossroads, some 20 miles (32 km) west of Amiens.

== Population ==
Historical population
Year	Pop.	±% p.a.
1968	188	—
1975	179	−0.70%
1982	161	−1.50%
1990	169	+0.61%
1999	165	−0.27%
2007	171	+0.45%
2012	174	+0.35%
2017	188	+1.56%
2023	182	−0.54%
Source: INSEE

== See also ==
- Communes of the Somme department
