= Montagne-Fayel =

- Commune
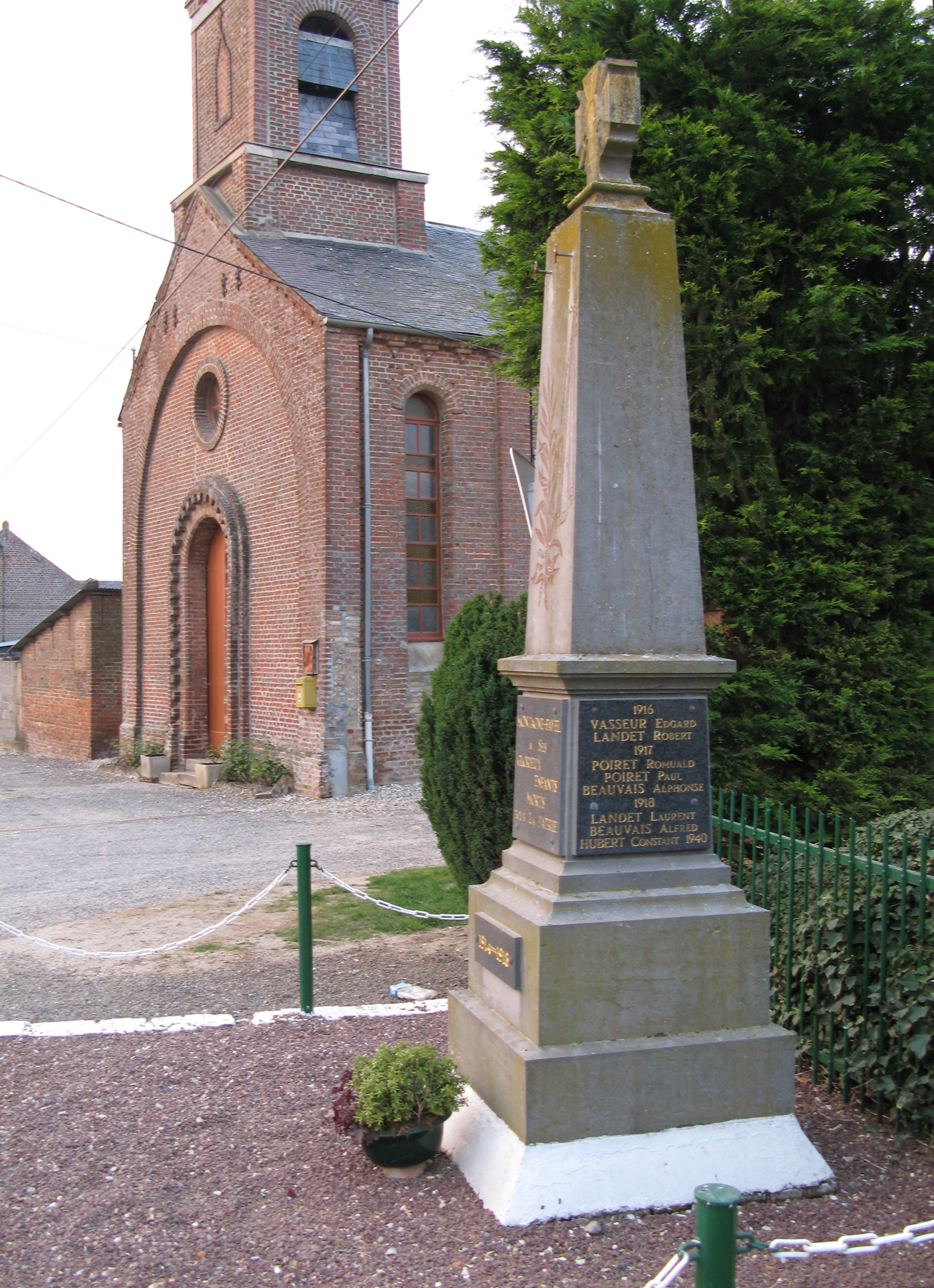
- The church and war memorial in Montagne-Fayel
- Location of Montagne-Fayel
- Location within France Location within Hauts-de-France
- Coordinates: 49°54′54″N 1°58′55″E
- Country: France
- Region: Hauts-de-France
- Department: Somme
- Arrondissement: Amiens
- Canton: Ailly-sur-Somme
- Intercommunality: CC Somme Sud-Ouest

Government
  - Mayor (2020–2026): Anne Legrand
- Area^{1}: 6.93 km^{2} (2.68 sq mi)
- Elevation: 133 m (436 ft)
- Highest elevation: 132 m (433 ft)
- Lowest elevation: 66 m (217 ft)
- Population (2023): 146
  - Density: 21.1/km^{2} (54.6/sq mi)
- Time zone: UTC+01:00 (CET)
  - Summer (DST): UTC+02:00 (CEST)
- INSEE/Postal code: 80559 /80540
- ^{1} French Land Register data, which excludes lakes, ponds, glaciers > 1 km^{2} (0.386 sq mi or 247 acres) and river estuaries.

Montagne-Fayel (French pronunciation: [mɔ̃taɲ fajɛl]; Picard: Montane-Foéyé) is a commune in the Somme department in Hauts-de-France in northern France.

== Geography ==
The commune is situated on the D38 road, some 14 miles (23 km) west of Amiens.

== Population ==
Historical population
| Year | Pop. | ±% p.a. |
|---|---|---|
| 1968 | 158 | — |
| 1975 | 149 | −0.83% |
| 1982 | 176 | +2.41% |
| 1990 | 162 | −1.03% |
| 1999 | 160 | −0.14% |
| 2007 | 171 | +0.83% |
| 2012 | 164 | −0.83% |
| 2017 | 145 | −2.43% |
| 2023 | 146 | +0.11% |
Source: INSEE

== Places of interest ==
- The red-brick church
- The war memorial

== See also ==
- Communes of the Somme department
