= Laleu, Somme =

Laleu
- Commune
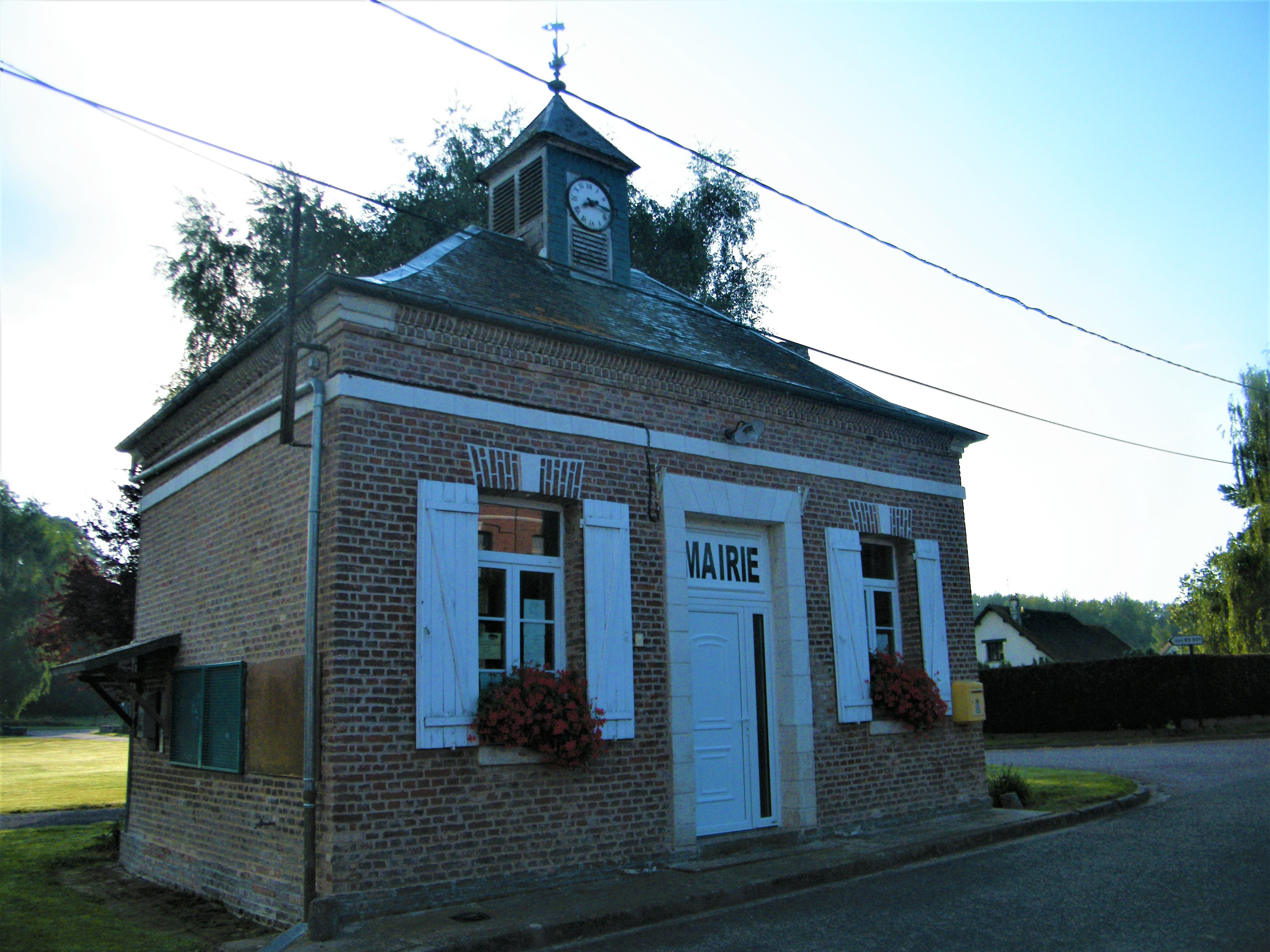
- The town hall in Laleu
- Location of Laleu
- Location within France Location within Hauts-de-France
- Coordinates: 49°56′32″N 1°55′59″E
- Country: France
- Region: Hauts-de-France
- Department: Somme
- Arrondissement: Amiens
- Canton: Ailly-sur-Somme
- Intercommunality: CC Somme Sud-Ouest

Government
  - Mayor (2020–2026): Wilfried Miannay
- Area^{1}: 1.56 km^{2} (0.60 sq mi)
- Elevation: 60 m (200 ft)
- Highest elevation: 63 m (207 ft)
- Lowest elevation: 27 m (89 ft)
- Population (2023): 98
  - Density: 63/km^{2} (160/sq mi)
- Time zone: UTC+01:00 (CET)
  - Summer (DST): UTC+02:00 (CEST)
- INSEE/Postal code: 80459 /80270
- ^{1} French Land Register data, which excludes lakes, ponds, glaciers > 1 km^{2} (0.386 sq mi or 247 acres) and river estuaries.

Laleu (French pronunciation: [lalø]) is a commune in the Somme department in Hauts-de-France in northern France.

== Geography ==
Laleu lies on the D96a road, some 13 miles (21 km) south of Abbeville.

== Population ==
Historical population
Year	Pop.	±% p.a.
1968	40	—
1975	43	+1.04%
1982	101	+12.97%
1990	92	−1.16%
1999	99	+0.82%
2007	90	−1.18%
2012	97	+1.51%
2017	117	+3.82%
2023	98	−2.91%
Source: INSEE

== See also ==
- Communes of the Somme department
