= Creuse, Somme =

Creuse
- Commune
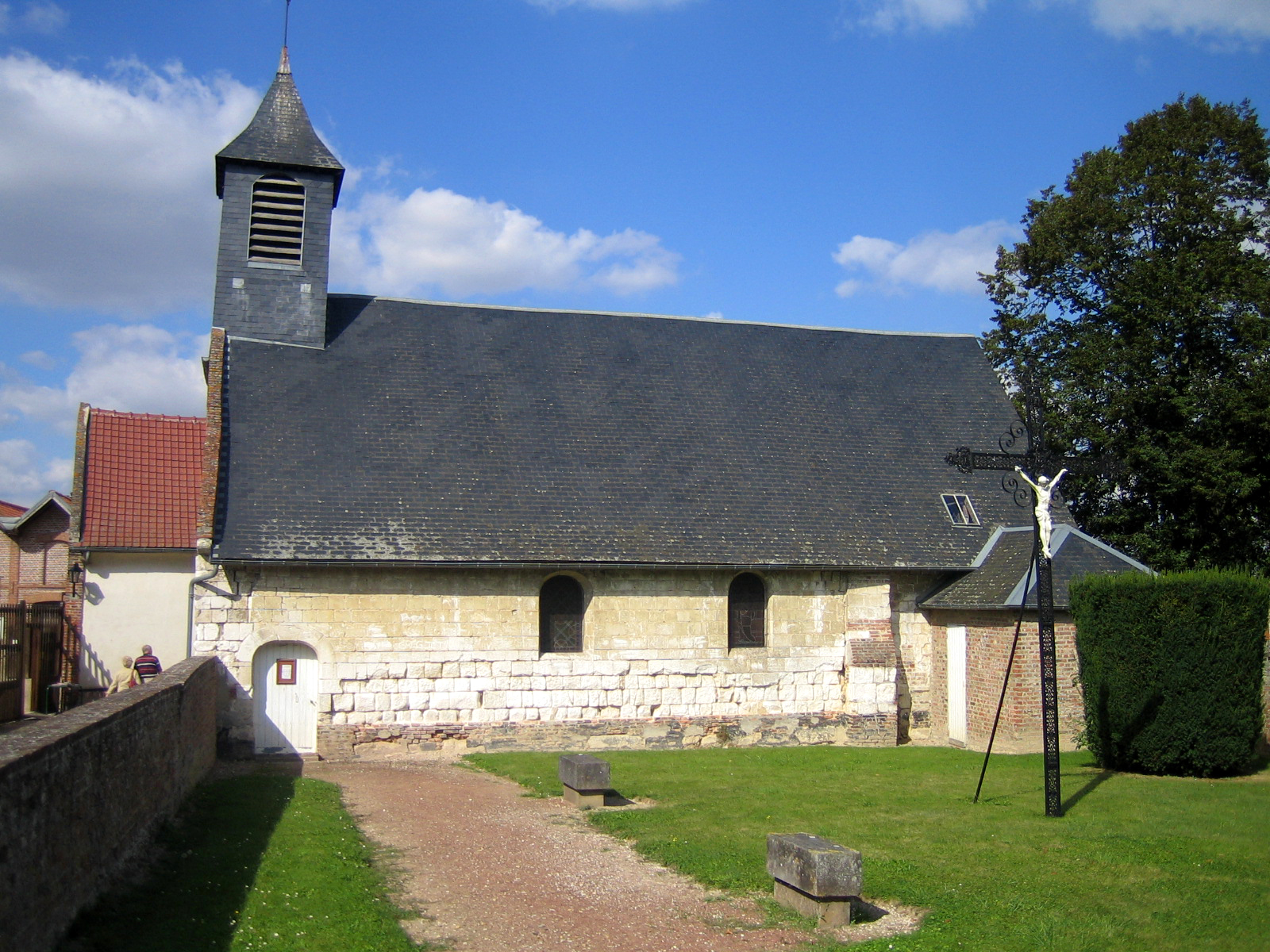
- The church in Creuse
- Location of Creuse
- Location within France Location within Hauts-de-France
- Coordinates: 49°50′25″N 2°09′55″E
- Country: France
- Region: Hauts-de-France
- Department: Somme
- Arrondissement: Amiens
- Canton: Ailly-sur-Somme
- Intercommunality: Amiens Métropole

Government
  - Mayor (2020–2026): Eric Capron
- Area^{1}: 5.02 km^{2} (1.94 sq mi)
- Elevation: 30 m (98 ft)
- Highest elevation: 124 m (407 ft)
- Lowest elevation: 53 m (174 ft)
- Population (2023): 186
  - Density: 37.1/km^{2} (96.0/sq mi)
- Time zone: UTC+01:00 (CET)
  - Summer (DST): UTC+02:00 (CEST)
- INSEE/Postal code: 80225 /80480
- ^{1} French Land Register data, which excludes lakes, ponds, glaciers > 1 km^{2} (0.386 sq mi or 247 acres) and river estuaries.

Creuse (French pronunciation: [kʁøz]) is a commune in the Somme department in Hauts-de-France in northern France.

== Geography ==
Creuse is situated on the D162 road, some 7 miles (11 km) southwest of Amiens.

== Population ==
Historical population
Year	Pop.	±% p.a.
1968	51	—
1975	61	+2.59%
1982	132	+11.66%
1990	210	+5.98%
1999	193	−0.93%
2007	202	+0.57%
2012	188	−1.43%
2017	190	+0.21%
2023	186	−0.35%
Source: INSEE

== See also ==
- Communes of the Somme department
