= Tailly, Somme =

Tailly
- Commune
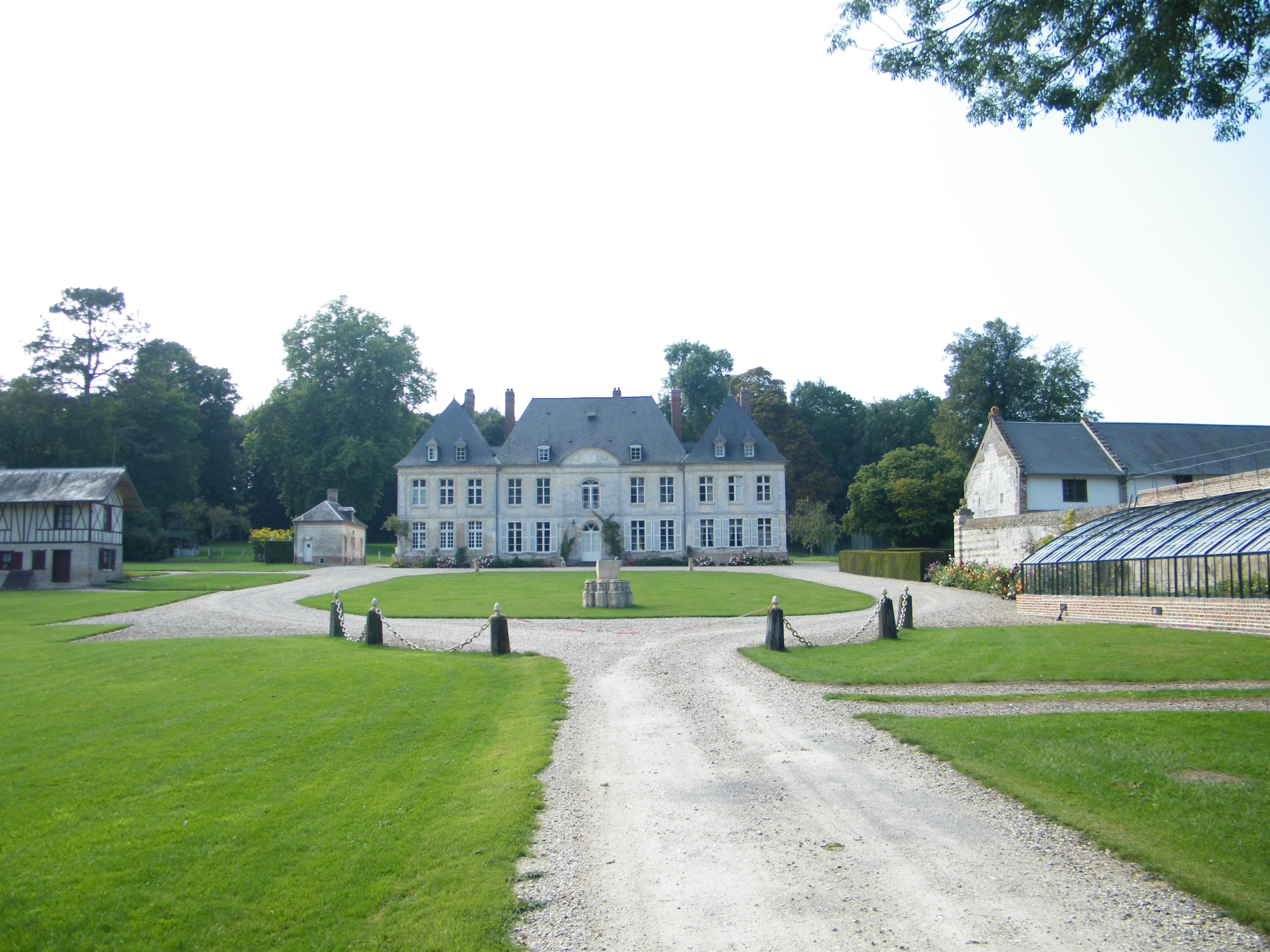
- The chateau of Tailly
- Location of Tailly
- Location within France Location within Hauts-de-France
- Coordinates: 49°55′53″N 1°56′52″E
- Country: France
- Region: Hauts-de-France
- Department: Somme
- Arrondissement: Amiens
- Canton: Ailly-sur-Somme
- Intercommunality: CC Somme Sud-Ouest

Government
  - Mayor (2020–2026): Sylviane Calippe
- Area^{1}: 4.05 km^{2} (1.56 sq mi)
- Elevation: 47 m (154 ft)
- Highest elevation: 87 m (285 ft)
- Lowest elevation: 32 m (105 ft)
- Population (2023): 58
  - Density: 14/km^{2} (37/sq mi)
- Time zone: UTC+01:00 (CET)
  - Summer (DST): UTC+02:00 (CEST)
- INSEE/Postal code: 80744 /80270
- ^{1} French Land Register data, which excludes lakes, ponds, glaciers > 1 km^{2} (0.386 sq mi or 247 acres) and river estuaries.

Tailly (French pronunciation: [taji]) is a commune in the Somme department in Hauts-de-France in northern France.

== Geography ==
Tailly is situated 12 miles (19 km) southeast of Abbeville, on the D901 road.

== Population ==
Historical population
| Year | Pop. | ±% p.a. |
|---|---|---|
| 1968 | 73 | — |
| 1975 | 60 | −2.76% |
| 1982 | 51 | −2.29% |
| 1990 | 72 | +4.40% |
| 1999 | 64 | −1.30% |
| 2007 | 63 | −0.20% |
| 2012 | 58 | −1.64% |
| 2017 | 59 | +0.34% |
| 2023 | 58 | −0.28% |
Source: INSEE

== Places of interest ==
- The eighteenth-century château and park. Family home of Marshal Leclerc de Hauteclocque. Exhibition of the story of the liberation of France in 1944.

== Personalities ==
- Genéral Philippe Leclerc de Hauteclocque, Marshal of France.

== See also ==
- Communes of the Somme department
