= Bougainville, Somme =

Bougainville
- Commune
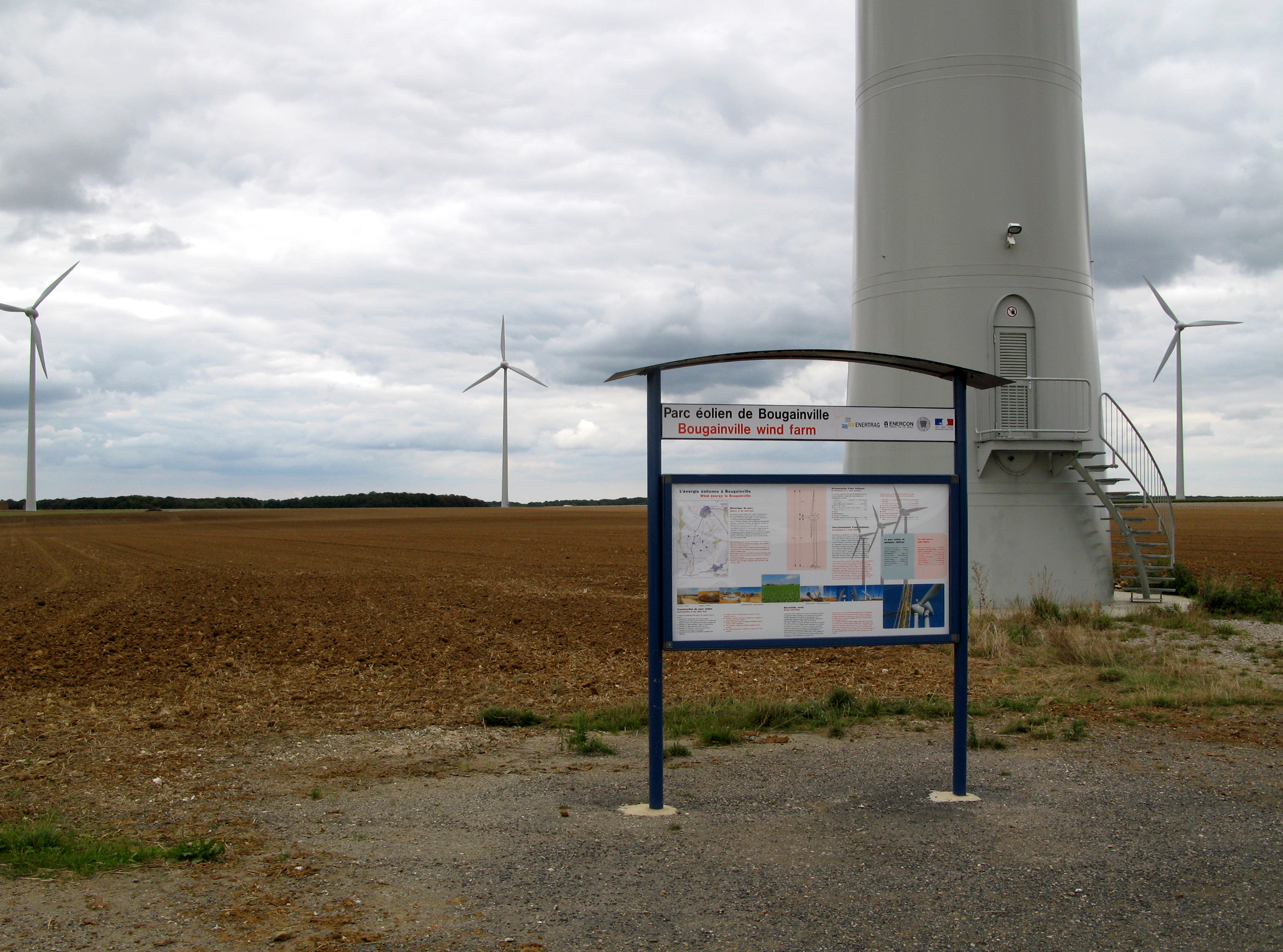
- The Bougainville wind farm
- Location of Bougainville
- Location within France Location within Hauts-de-France
- Coordinates: 49°52′15″N 2°02′34″E
- Country: France
- Region: Hauts-de-France
- Department: Somme
- Arrondissement: Amiens
- Canton: Ailly-sur-Somme
- Intercommunality: CC Somme Sud-Ouest

Government
  - Mayor (2020–2026): Gérard Célisse
- Area^{1}: 10.21 km^{2} (3.94 sq mi)
- Elevation: 119 m (390 ft)
- Highest elevation: 128 m (420 ft)
- Lowest elevation: 54 m (177 ft)
- Population (2023): 389
  - Density: 38.1/km^{2} (98.7/sq mi)
- Time zone: UTC+01:00 (CET)
  - Summer (DST): UTC+02:00 (CEST)
- INSEE/Postal code: 80119 /80540
- ^{1} French Land Register data, which excludes lakes, ponds, glaciers > 1 km^{2} (0.386 sq mi or 247 acres) and river estuaries.

Bougainville (French pronunciation: [buɡɛ̃vil]; Picard: Boudjinville) is a commune in the Somme department in Hauts-de-France in northern France.

== Geography ==
Bougainville is situated on the D141 road, some 15 miles (24 km) west of Amiens.

== Population ==
Historical population
Year	Pop.	±% p.a.
1968	358	—
1975	374	+0.63%
1982	406	+1.18%
1990	413	+0.21%
1999	409	−0.11%
2007	491	+2.31%
2012	436	−2.35%
2017	448	+0.54%
2023	389	−2.33%
Source: INSEE

== Places of interest ==
- Church of Saint-Arnould (18th century)
- Traces of a Gallo-Roman villa.

== See also ==
- Communes of the Somme department
