= Pissy, Somme =

Pissy
- Commune
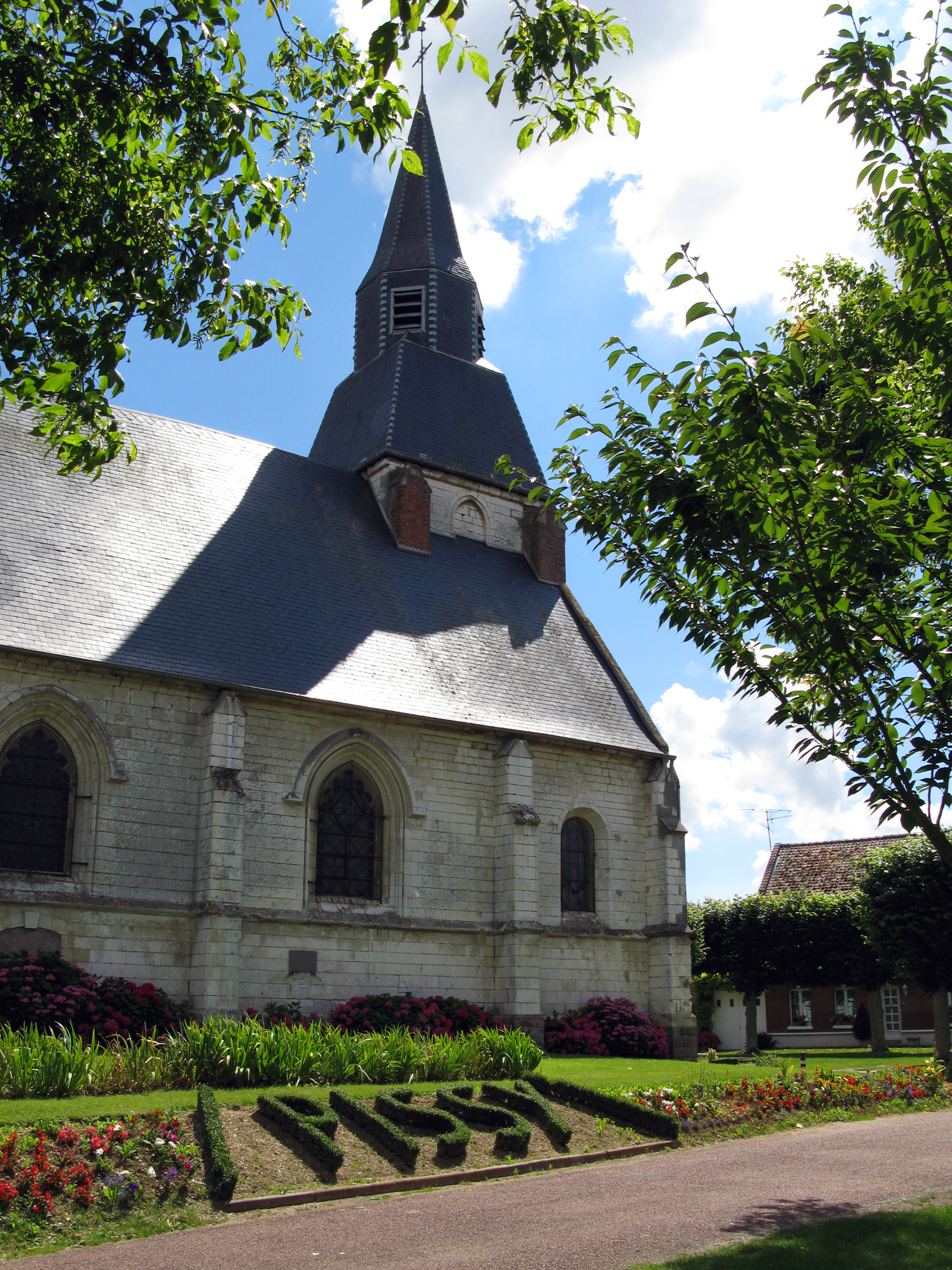
- The church in Pissy

- Coat of arms
- Location of Pissy
- Location within France Location within Hauts-de-France
- Coordinates: 49°51′46″N 2°07′54″E
- Country: France
- Region: Hauts-de-France
- Department: Somme
- Arrondissement: Amiens
- Canton: Ailly-sur-Somme
- Intercommunality: Amiens Métropole

Government
  - Mayor (2020–2026): Laurent Vindevogel
- Area^{1}: 6.63 km^{2} (2.56 sq mi)
- Elevation: 112 m (367 ft)
- Highest elevation: 127 m (417 ft)
- Lowest elevation: 90 m (300 ft)
- Population (2023): 284
  - Density: 42.8/km^{2} (111/sq mi)
- Time zone: UTC+01:00 (CET)
  - Summer (DST): UTC+02:00 (CEST)
- INSEE/Postal code: 80626 /80540
- ^{1} French Land Register data, which excludes lakes, ponds, glaciers > 1 km^{2} (0.386 sq mi or 247 acres) and river estuaries.

Pissy (French pronunciation: [pisi]) is a commune in the Somme department in Hauts-de-France in northern France.

== Geography ==
Pissy is situated on the D97 and D182 crossroads, some 6 miles (10 km) southwest of Amiens.

== Population ==
Historical population
Year	Pop.	±% p.a.
1968	177	—
1975	176	−0.08%
1982	220	+3.24%
1990	304	+4.13%
1999	298	−0.22%
2007	267	−1.36%
2012	286	+1.38%
2017	281	−0.35%
2023	284	+0.18%
Source: INSEE

== Places of interest ==
- The church
- The château
- The town hall
- War memorial
- Two stone wells

== See also ==
- Communes of the Somme department
