= Fresnoy-au-Val =

- Commune
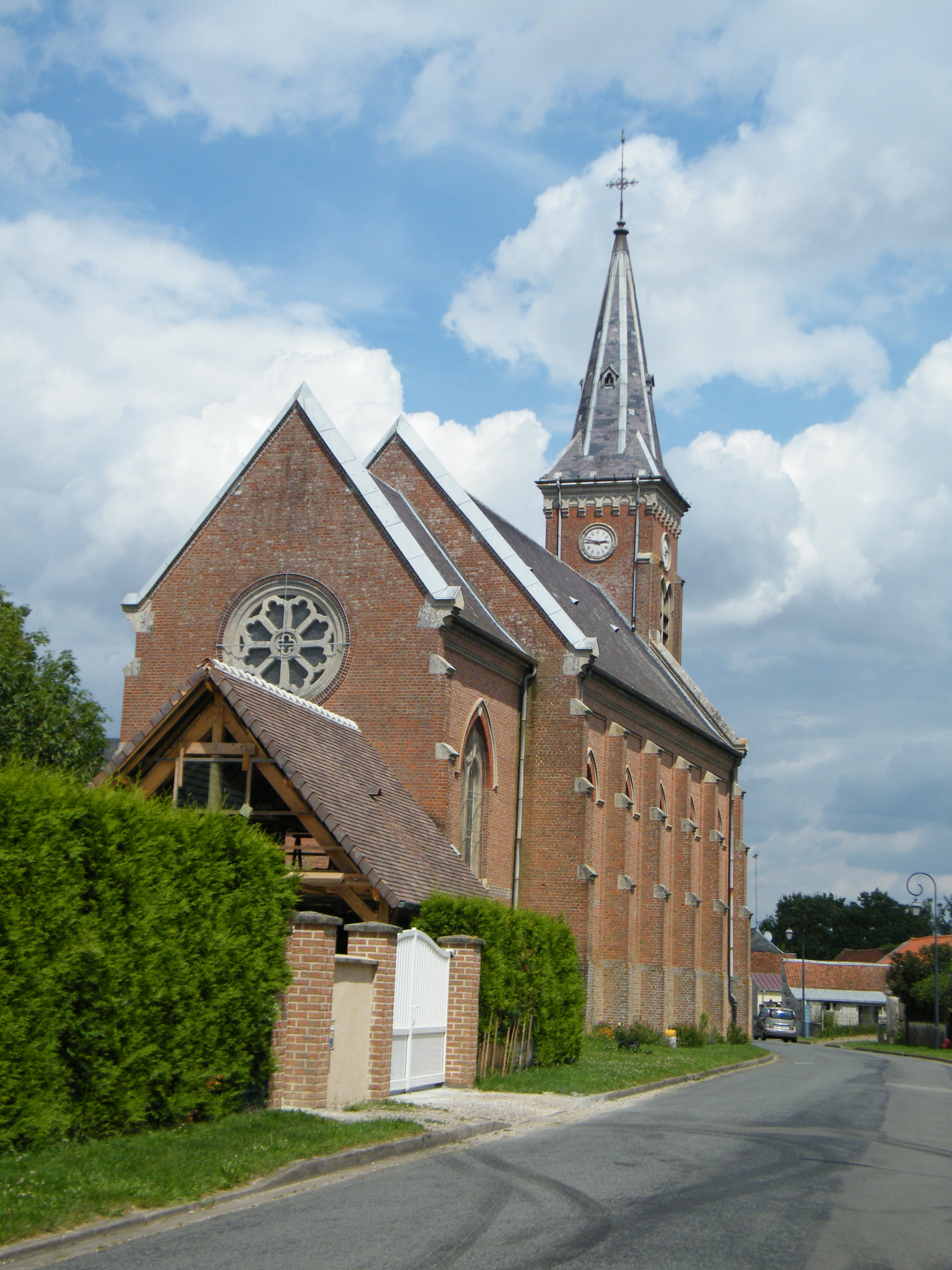
- The church in Fresnoy-au-Val
- Location of Fresnoy-au-Val
- Location within France Location within Hauts-de-France
- Coordinates: 49°50′09″N 2°03′22″E
- Country: France
- Region: Hauts-de-France
- Department: Somme
- Arrondissement: Amiens
- Canton: Ailly-sur-Somme
- Intercommunality: CC Somme Sud-Ouest

Government
  - Mayor (2020–2026): Alain Desfosses
- Area^{1}: 8.07 km^{2} (3.12 sq mi)
- Elevation: 124 m (407 ft)
- Highest elevation: 139 m (456 ft)
- Lowest elevation: 70 m (230 ft)
- Population (2023): 223
  - Density: 27.6/km^{2} (71.6/sq mi)
- Time zone: UTC+01:00 (CET)
  - Summer (DST): UTC+02:00 (CEST)
- INSEE/Postal code: 80357 /80290
- ^{1} French Land Register data, which excludes lakes, ponds, glaciers > 1 km^{2} (0.386 sq mi or 247 acres) and river estuaries.

Fresnoy-au-Val (French pronunciation: [fʁɛnwa o val]; Picard: Frénoé-au-Val) is a commune in the Somme department in Hauts-de-France in northern France.

== Geography ==
The commune is situated 16 miles (26 km) southwest of Amiens on the D51 road half a mile from the A29 autoroute

== Population ==
Historical population
Year	Pop.	±% p.a.
1968	216	—
1975	197	−1.31%
1982	181	−1.20%
1990	218	+2.35%
1999	225	+0.35%
2007	246	+1.12%
2012	248	+0.16%
2017	243	−0.41%
2023	223	−1.42%
Source: INSEE

== See also ==
- Communes of the Somme department
