= Clairy-Saulchoix =

- Commune
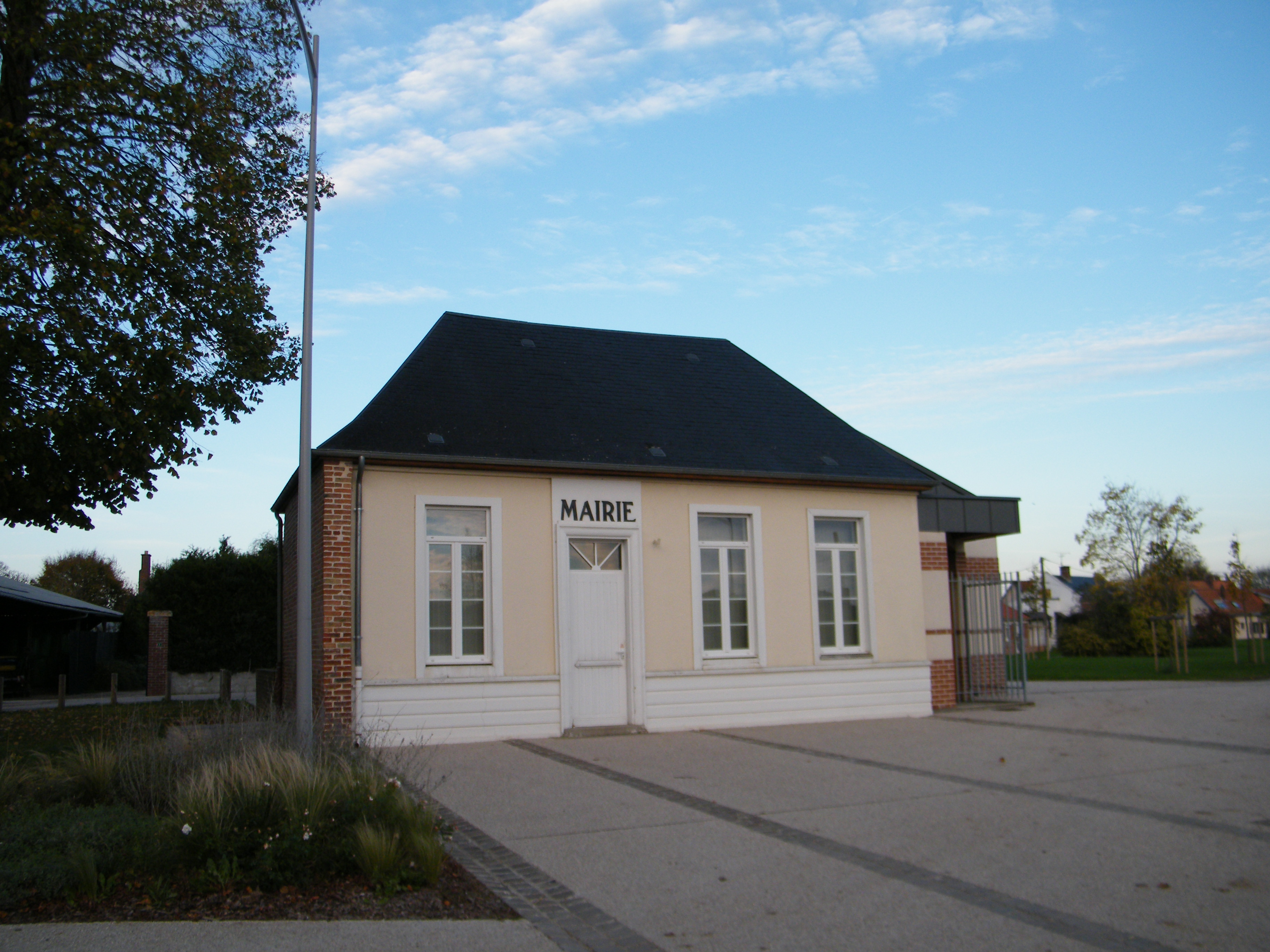
- The town hall in Clairy-Saulchoix

- Coat of arms
- Location of Clairy-Saulchoix
- Location within France Location within Hauts-de-France
- Coordinates: 49°51′23″N 2°10′48″E
- Country: France
- Region: Hauts-de-France
- Department: Somme
- Arrondissement: Amiens
- Canton: Ailly-sur-Somme
- Intercommunality: Amiens Métropole

Government
  - Mayor (2020–2026): Benoît Dumeige
- Area^{1}: 6.52 km^{2} (2.52 sq mi)
- Elevation: 102 m (335 ft)
- Highest elevation: 124 m (407 ft)
- Lowest elevation: 59 m (194 ft)
- Population (2023): 376
  - Density: 57.7/km^{2} (149/sq mi)
- Time zone: UTC+01:00 (CET)
  - Summer (DST): UTC+02:00 (CEST)
- INSEE/Postal code: 80198 /80540
- ^{1} French Land Register data, which excludes lakes, ponds, glaciers > 1 km^{2} (0.386 sq mi or 247 acres) and river estuaries.

Clairy-Saulchoix (Picard: Clairy-Cheuchoé) is a commune in the Somme department in Hauts-de-France in northern France.

== Geography ==
The commune is situated on the D162 road, near both the A29 autoroute and the N29 road, some 5 miles (8 km) west of Amiens.

== Population ==
Historical population
Year	Pop.	±% p.a.
1968	292	—
1975	313	+1.00%
1982	364	+2.18%
1990	361	−0.10%
1999	390	+0.86%
2007	364	−0.86%
2012	383	+1.02%
2017	370	−0.69%
2023	376	+0.27%
Source: INSEE

== See also ==
- Communes of the Somme department
