= Métigny =

- Commune
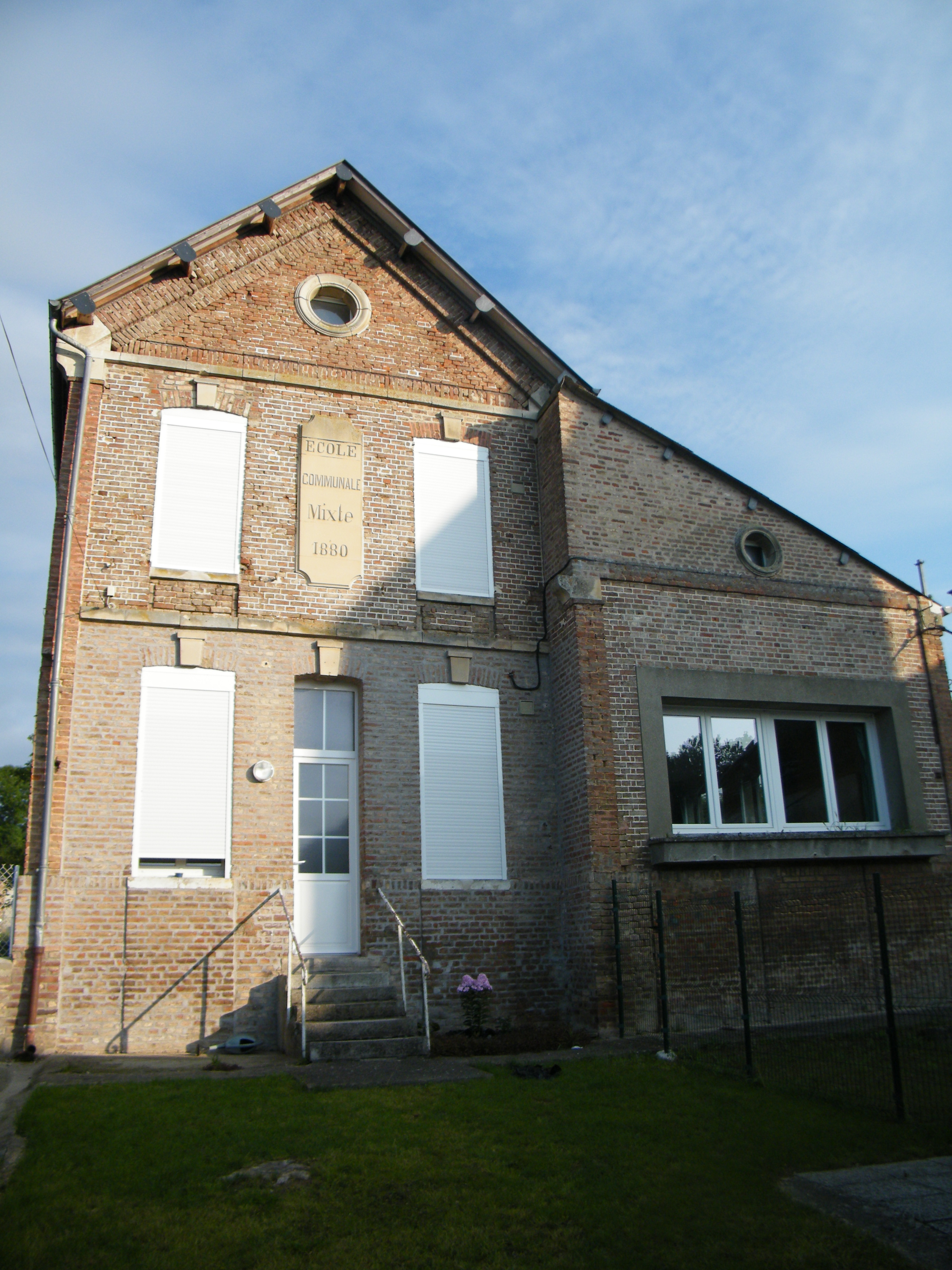
- The old school in Métigny

- Coat of arms
- Location of Métigny
- Location within France Location within Hauts-de-France
- Coordinates: 49°56′45″N 1°55′42″E
- Country: France
- Region: Hauts-de-France
- Department: Somme
- Arrondissement: Amiens
- Canton: Ailly-sur-Somme
- Intercommunality: CC Somme Sud-Ouest

Government
  - Mayor (2020–2026): Pascal Bouton
- Area^{1}: 6.68 km^{2} (2.58 sq mi)
- Elevation: 47 m (154 ft)
- Highest elevation: 119 m (390 ft)
- Lowest elevation: 29 m (95 ft)
- Population (2023): 122
  - Density: 18.3/km^{2} (47.3/sq mi)
- Time zone: UTC+01:00 (CET)
  - Summer (DST): UTC+02:00 (CEST)
- INSEE/Postal code: 80543 /80270
- ^{1} French Land Register data, which excludes lakes, ponds, glaciers > 1 km^{2} (0.386 sq mi or 247 acres) and river estuaries.

Métigny (French pronunciation: [metiɲi]) is a commune in the Somme department in Hauts-de-France in northern France.

== Geography ==
The commune is situated on the D96 road, some 15 miles (24 km) south of Abbeville.

== Population ==
Historical population
Year	Pop.	±% p.a.
1968	118	—
1975	101	−2.20%
1982	92	−1.32%
1990	91	−0.14%
1999	88	−0.37%
2007	100	+1.61%
2012	126	+4.73%
2017	118	−1.30%
2023	122	+0.56%
Source: INSEE

== See also ==
- Communes of the Somme department
