= Avelesges =

- Commune
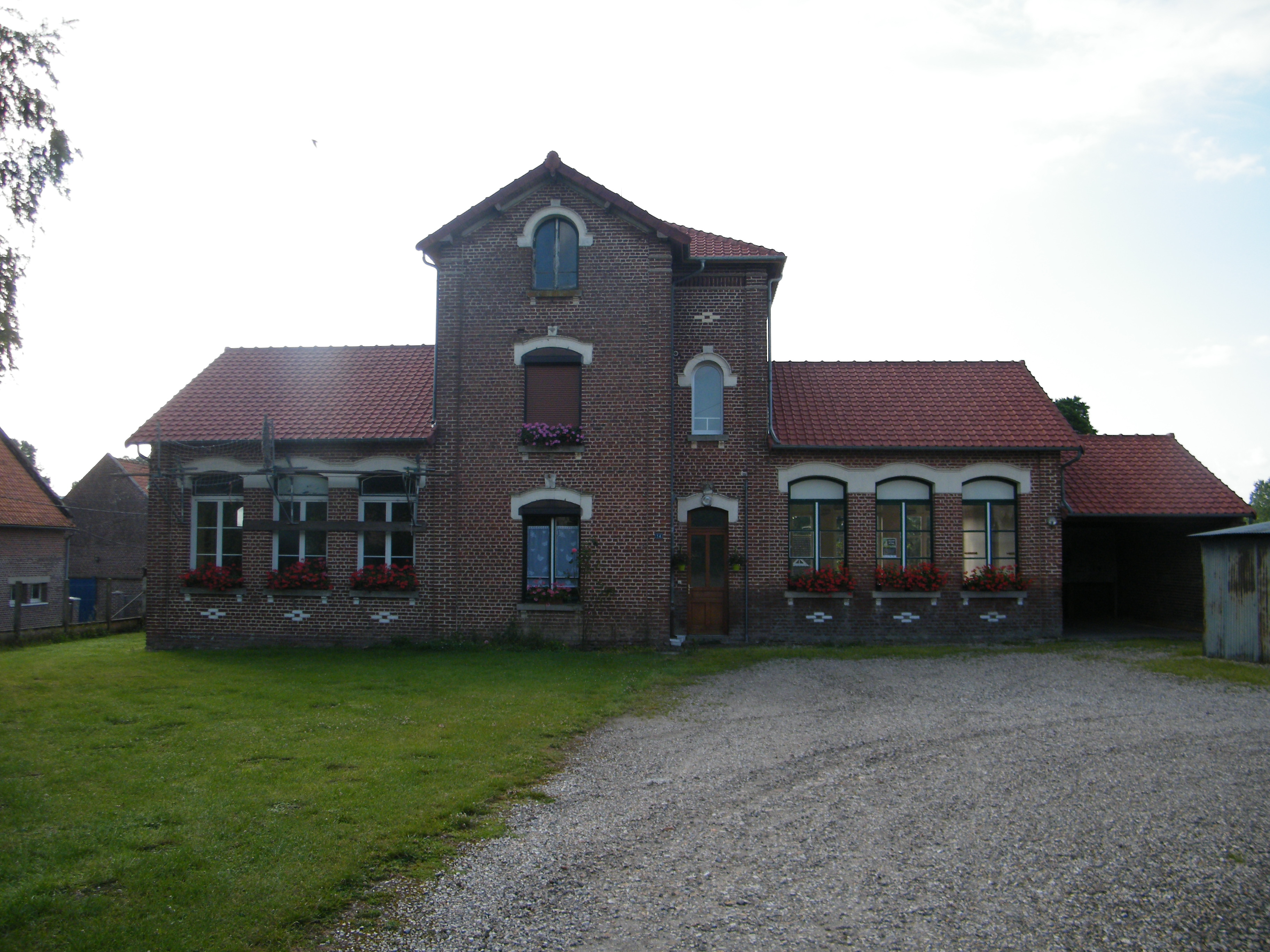
- The town hall and school in Avelesges

- Coat of arms
- Location of Avelesges
- Location within France Location within Hauts-de-France
- Coordinates: 49°55′01″N 1°56′12″E
- Country: France
- Region: Hauts-de-France
- Department: Somme
- Arrondissement: Amiens
- Canton: Ailly-sur-Somme
- Intercommunality: CC Somme Sud-Ouest

Government
  - Mayor (2020–2026): Thierry Hébert
- Area^{1}: 4.87 km^{2} (1.88 sq mi)
- Elevation: 50 m (160 ft)
- Highest elevation: 123 m (404 ft)
- Lowest elevation: 43 m (141 ft)
- Population (2023): 48
  - Density: 9.9/km^{2} (26/sq mi)
- Time zone: UTC+01:00 (CET)
  - Summer (DST): UTC+02:00 (CEST)
- INSEE/Postal code: 80046 /80270
- ^{1} French Land Register data, which excludes lakes, ponds, glaciers > 1 km^{2} (0.386 sq mi or 247 acres) and river estuaries.

Avelesges (French pronunciation: [avlɛʒ]; Picard: Avlège) is a commune in the Somme department in Hauts-de-France in northern France.

== See also ==
- Communes of the Somme department
