= Oissy =

- Commune
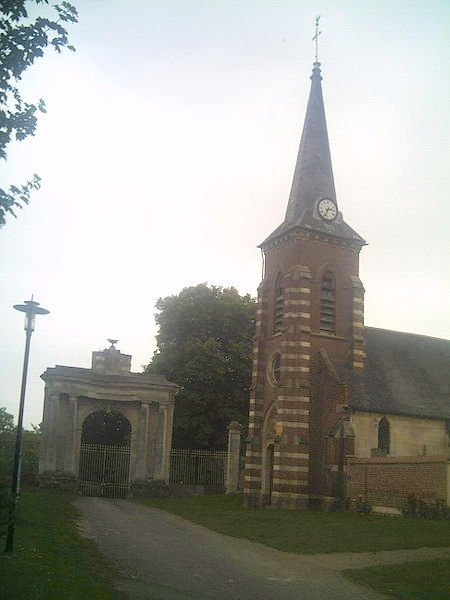
- The church in Oissy

- Coat of arms
- Location of Oissy
- Location within France Location within Hauts-de-France
- Coordinates: 49°54′20″N 2°03′05″E
- Country: France
- Region: Hauts-de-France
- Department: Somme
- Arrondissement: Amiens
- Canton: Ailly-sur-Somme
- Intercommunality: CC Somme Sud-Ouest

Government
  - Mayor (2020–2026): Patrick Lepine
- Area^{1}: 5.52 km^{2} (2.13 sq mi)
- Elevation: 25 m (82 ft)
- Highest elevation: 119 m (390 ft)
- Lowest elevation: 37 m (121 ft)
- Population (2023): 206
  - Density: 37.3/km^{2} (96.7/sq mi)
- Time zone: UTC+01:00 (CET)
  - Summer (DST): UTC+02:00 (CEST)
- INSEE/Postal code: 80607 /80540
- ^{1} French Land Register data, which excludes lakes, ponds, glaciers > 1 km^{2} (0.386 sq mi or 247 acres) and river estuaries.

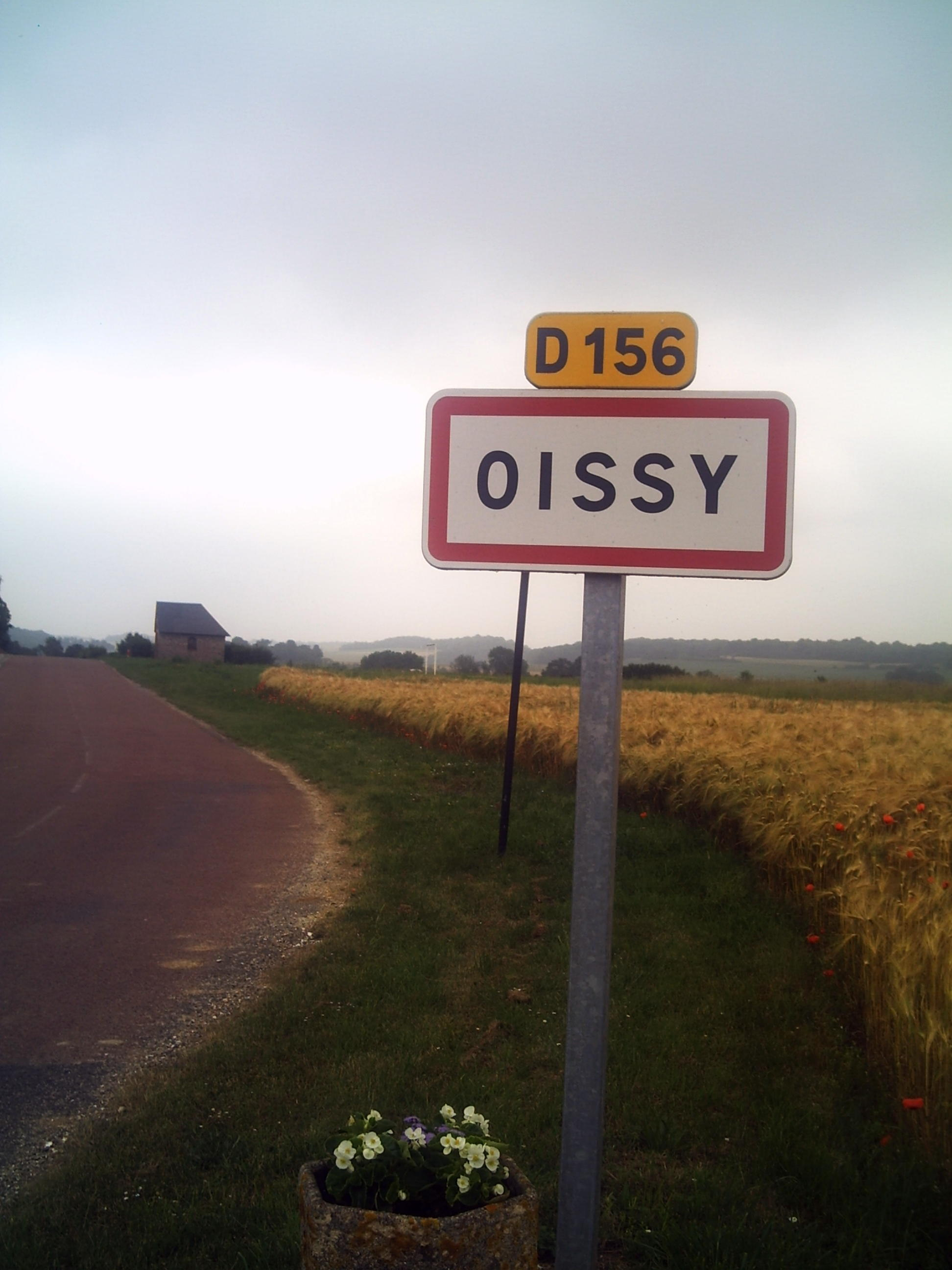

Oissy (French pronunciation: [wasi]; Picard: Oéssy) is a commune in the Somme department in Hauts-de-France in northern France.

== Geography ==
Oissy is situated on the D156 road, some 13 miles (21 km) west of Amiens.

== Demographics ==
Historical population
Year	Pop.	±% p.a.
1968	99	—
1975	109	+1.38%
1982	182	+7.60%
1990	211	+1.87%
1999	213	+0.10%
2007	232	+1.07%
2012	236	+0.34%
2017	221	−1.30%
2023	206	−1.16%
Source: INSEE

== Places of interest ==
- The 17th/18th-century château. Built by François Trudaine as part of a great estate sold to the nation in 1795. Much of the grounds still exist. The entrance and the ground-floor were severely damaged in a fire in 1946. Constructed in red brick and sandstone on a rectangular plan, it has a mansard style roof. The water feature is in its original shape. The château and its domain constitute an interesting example of châteaux of the late 17th century in the region.
- The church

== See also ==
- Communes of the Somme department
