= Warlus, Somme =

Warlus
- Commune
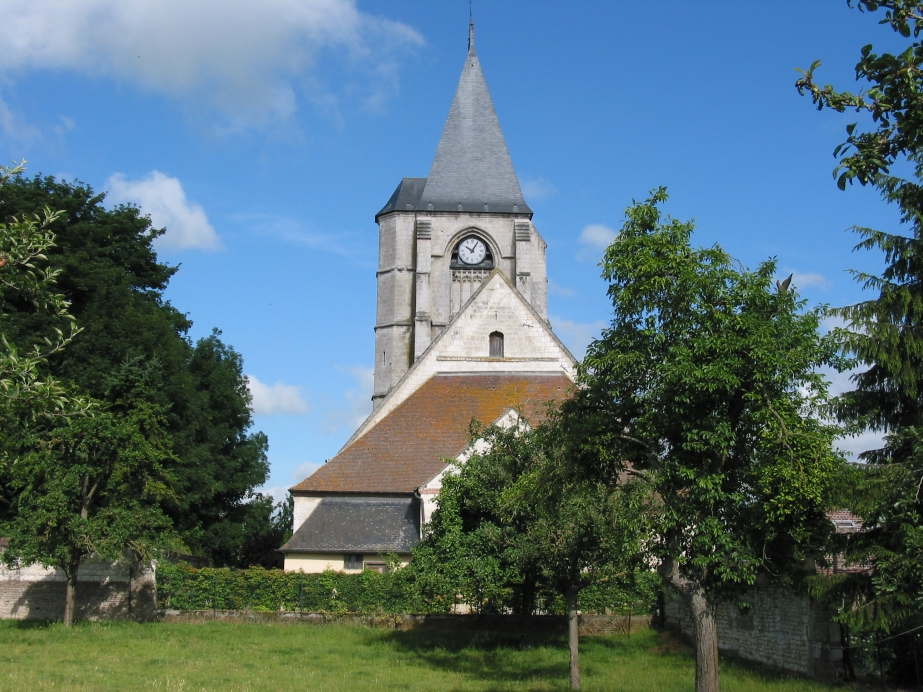
- The church in Warlus
- Location of Warlus
- Location within France Location within Hauts-de-France
- Coordinates: 49°55′29″N 1°56′43″E
- Country: France
- Region: Hauts-de-France
- Department: Somme
- Arrondissement: Amiens
- Canton: Ailly-sur-Somme
- Intercommunality: Somme Sud-Ouest

Government
  - Mayor (2020–2026): Bruno Mariage
- Area^{1}: 8.12 km^{2} (3.14 sq mi)
- Elevation: 48 m (157 ft)
- Highest elevation: 130 m (430 ft)
- Lowest elevation: 37 m (121 ft)
- Population (2023): 230
  - Density: 28/km^{2} (73/sq mi)
- Time zone: UTC+01:00 (CET)
  - Summer (DST): UTC+02:00 (CEST)
- INSEE/Postal code: 80821 /80270
- ^{1} French Land Register data, which excludes lakes, ponds, glaciers > 1 km^{2} (0.386 sq mi or 247 acres) and river estuaries.

Warlus is a commune in the Somme department in Hauts-de-France in northern France. Warlus is situated 16 miles(26 km) west of Amiens, on the D18 road. One place of interest in Walrus is the sixteenth-century church of Saint-Apre.

== Population ==
Historical population
| Year | Pop. | ±% p.a. |
|---|---|---|
| 1968 | 238 | — |
| 1975 | 218 | −1.25% |
| 1982 | 249 | +1.92% |
| 1990 | 219 | −1.59% |
| 1999 | 225 | +0.30% |
| 2007 | 226 | +0.06% |
| 2012 | 227 | +0.09% |
| 2017 | 222 | −0.44% |
| 2023 | 230 | +0.59% |
Source: INSEE

== History ==
The name of Warlus may have its origins in the name of an early bishop. Other sources say it comes from the Anglo-Saxon war(store or watch) and lux (light). In the 12th century, there was once a high tower which may have been used as a beacon during wartime.
There is nothing to suggest that Warlus is very old. It doesn't appear to have had a castle and seems to have grown around a former convent, of which few vestiges remain (a few walls and some underground passages). The priors came from the Abbey of Selaincourt.
In the 12th century, the population grouped around the monastery and build a church. In the 16th & 17th centuries the seigneurs came from the Crequy family of Poix-de-Picardie.
During the Hundred Years War, the English went through the territory (there's an 'English path' in Warlus woods) from Poix-de-Picardie to Airaines.
The tithes belonged to the abbey of Saint-Martin, Saint-Pierre of Selaincourt and Berteaucourt, and the Celestine convent.
