= Communauté de communes du Sud-Ouest Amiénois =

Coordinates: 49.7747°N 1.9857°E

Sud-Ouest Amiénois
- Former communauté de communes
- Interactive map of Sud-Ouest Amiénois
- Country: France
- Region: Hauts-de-France
- Department: Somme
- No. of communes: {{{nbcomm}}}
- Established: 2006
- Disbanded: 2017
- Population (2013): 21,967

The Communauté de communes du Sud-Ouest Amiénois is a former communauté de communes in the Somme département and in the Picardie région of France. It was created in June 2004. It was merged into the new Communauté de communes Somme Sud-Ouest in January 2017.

== History ==
The communauté de communes succeeded the Syndicat mixte Pays Somme sud ouest (SMPSSO), the dissolution taking effect on 1 January 2008. The ‘’syndicat mixte’’, created in 1981, covered 6 of the neighbouring cantons. The new body was created by order of the prefect on 30 June 2004. It included 63 communes in the cantons of Hornoy-le-Bourg, Poix-de-Picardie and part of the Canton de Molliens-Dreuil.

== Composition ==
This Communauté de communes comprised 63 communes:

1. Airaines
2. Arguel, Somme
3. Aumont, Somme
4. Avelesges
5. Beaucamps-le-Jeune
6. Beaucamps-le-Vieux
7. Belloy-Saint-Léonard
8. Bergicourt
9. Bettembos
10. Blangy-sous-Poix
11. Bougainville, Somme
12. Briquemesnil-Floxicourt
13. Brocourt
14. Bussy-lès-Poix
15. Camps-en-Amiénois
16. Caulières
17. Courcelles-sous-Moyencourt
18. Croixrault
19. Dromesnil
20. Éplessier
21. Équennes-Éramecourt
22. Famechon, Somme
23. Fluy
24. Fourcigny
25. Fresnoy-au-Val
26. Fricamps
27. Gauville
28. Guizancourt
29. Hescamps
30. Hornoy-le-Bourg
31. Lachapelle, Somme
32. Lafresguimont-Saint-Martin
33. Laleu, Somme
34. Lamaronde
35. Le Quesne
36. Lignières-Châtelain
37. Liomer
38. Marlers
39. Meigneux, Somme
40. Méréaucourt
41. Méricourt-en-Vimeu
42. Métigny
43. Molliens-Dreuil
44. Montagne-Fayel
45. Morvillers-Saint-Saturnin
46. Moyencourt-lès-Poix
47. Neuville-Coppegueule
48. Offignies
49. Oissy
50. Poix-de-Picardie
51. Quesnoy-sur-Airaines
52. Quevauvillers
53. Riencourt
54. Saint-Aubin-Montenoy
55. Sainte-Segrée
56. Saint-Germain-sur-Bresle
57. Saulchoy-sous-Poix
58. Tailly, Somme
59. Thieulloy-l'Abbaye
60. Thieulloy-la-Ville
61. Villers-Campsart
62. Vraignes-lès-Hornoy
63. Warlus, Somme

== Other groupings ==
The Community Council, on 14 June 2007, adopted the principle of membership of the "Syndicat mixte du Pays du Grand Amiénois".

== Projects and goals ==
The Community plans to carry out or support actions:

- In terms of economic development, for example, around the future motorway interchange on the A29 at Croixrault.
- In areas of direct interest to the lives of the people: housing (plan of action for the implementation of multi-family housing), culture (financing actions promoting libraries) and multimedia (development in the intercommunal territory).

== See also ==
- Communes of the Somme department
