= Meigneux =

Meigneux is the name of two communes in France:

- Meigneux, in the Seine-et-Marne département
- Meigneux, in the Somme département
