= Le Translay =

- Commune
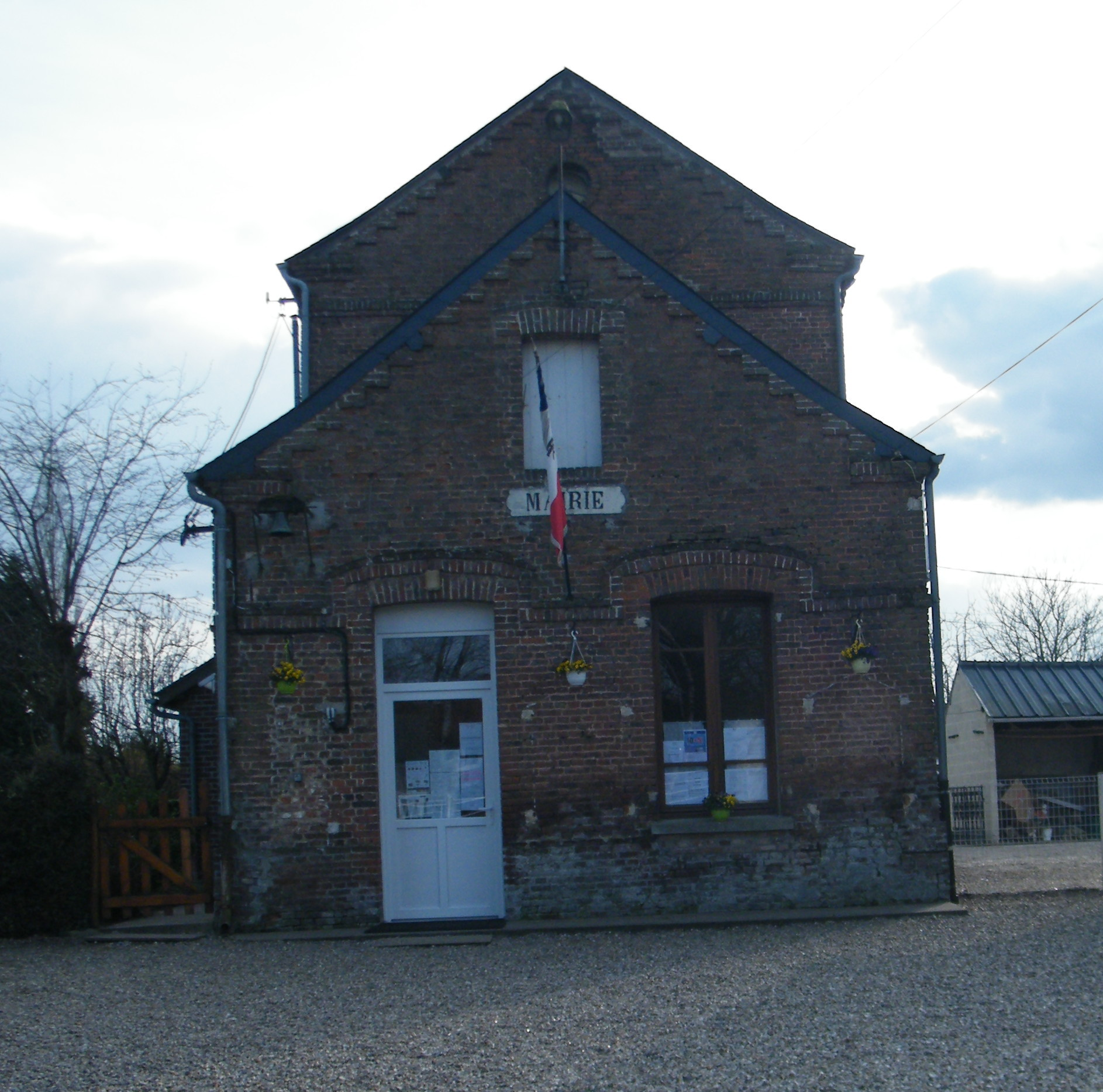
- The town hall in Le Translay
- Location of Le Translay
- Location within France Location within Hauts-de-France
- Coordinates: 49°58′13″N 1°40′35″E
- Country: France
- Region: Hauts-de-France
- Department: Somme
- Arrondissement: Amiens
- Canton: Poix-de-Picardie
- Intercommunality: CC Somme Sud-Ouest

Government
  - Mayor (2020–2026): Jean de Beaufort
- Area^{1}: 5.61 km^{2} (2.17 sq mi)
- Elevation: 132 m (433 ft)
- Highest elevation: 139 m (456 ft)
- Lowest elevation: 109 m (358 ft)
- Population (2023): 234
  - Density: 41.7/km^{2} (108/sq mi)
- Time zone: UTC+01:00 (CET)
  - Summer (DST): UTC+02:00 (CEST)
- INSEE/Postal code: 80767 /80140
- ^{1} French Land Register data, which excludes lakes, ponds, glaciers > 1 km^{2} (0.386 sq mi or 247 acres) and river estuaries.

Le Translay (French pronunciation: [lə tʁɑ̃lɛ]) is a commune in the Somme department in Hauts-de-France in northern France.

== Geography ==
The communes is situated 12 miles (19 km) southwest of Abbeville, on the D928 road.

== Population ==
Historical population
Year	Pop.	±% p.a.
1968	201	—
1975	202	+0.07%
1982	198	−0.29%
1990	200	+0.13%
1999	182	−1.04%
2007	201	+1.25%
2012	235	+3.17%
2017	248	+1.08%
2023	234	−0.96%
Source: INSEE

== Places of interest ==
- The church of Saint Jean-Baptiste
- A square shaped feudal motte

== See also ==
- Communes of the Somme department
