= Thieulloy-la-Ville =

- Commune
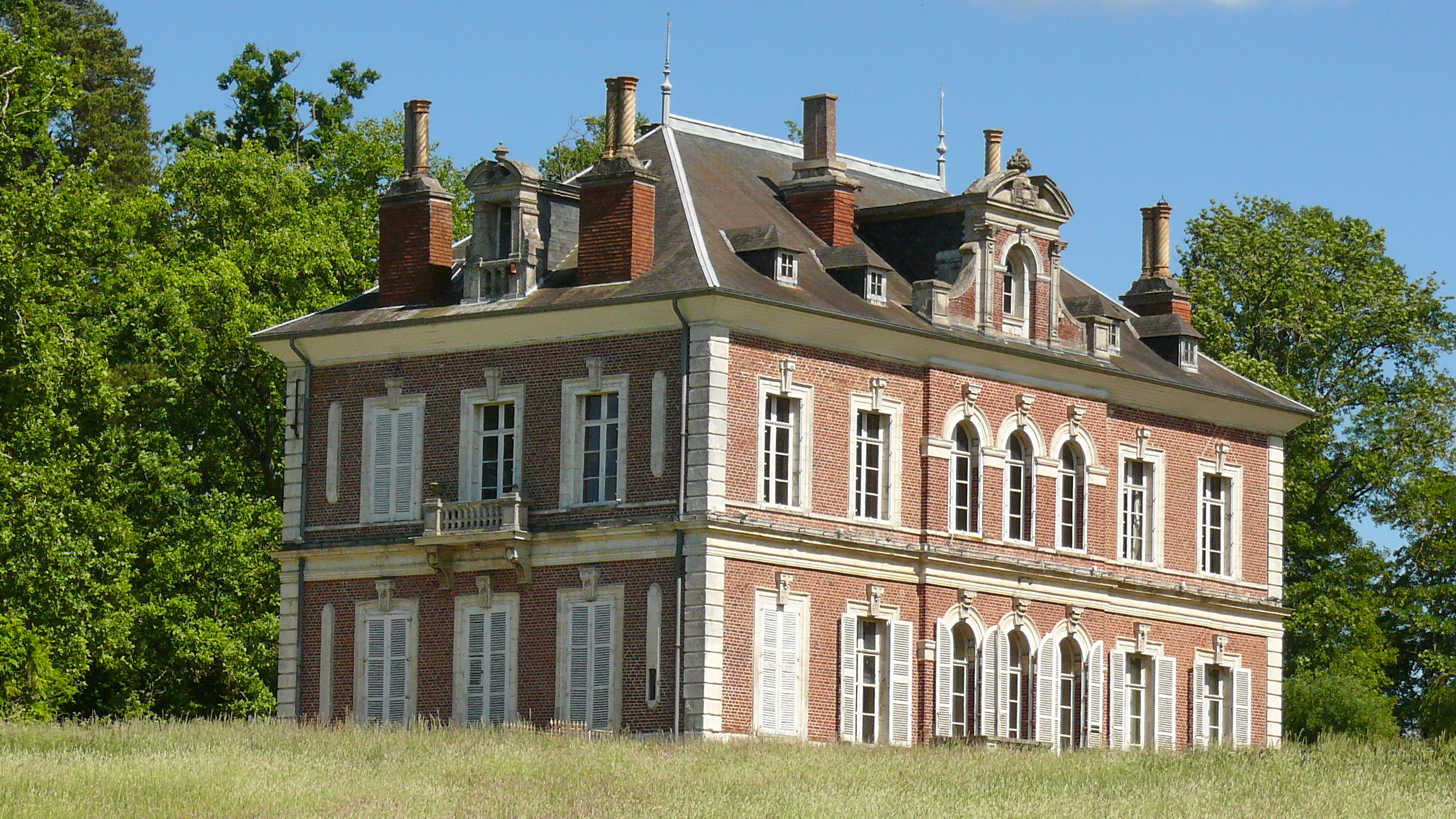
- The chateau in Thieulloy-la-Ville
- Location of Thieulloy-la-Ville
- Location within France Location within Hauts-de-France
- Coordinates: 49°44′52″N 1°55′52″E
- Country: France
- Region: Hauts-de-France
- Department: Somme
- Arrondissement: Amiens
- Canton: Poix-de-Picardie
- Intercommunality: CC Somme Sud-Ouest

Government
  - Mayor (2020–2026): Gérard Crosnier
- Area^{1}: 3.28 km^{2} (1.27 sq mi)
- Elevation: 180 m (590 ft)
- Highest elevation: 189 m (620 ft)
- Lowest elevation: 130 m (430 ft)
- Population (2023): 141
  - Density: 43.0/km^{2} (111/sq mi)
- Time zone: UTC+01:00 (CET)
  - Summer (DST): UTC+02:00 (CEST)
- INSEE/Postal code: 80755 /80290
- ^{1} French Land Register data, which excludes lakes, ponds, glaciers > 1 km^{2} (0.386 sq mi or 247 acres) and river estuaries.

Thieulloy-la-Ville is a commune in the Somme department in Hauts-de-France in northern France.

== Geography ==
The commune is situated 34 kilometres (21 mi) southwest of Amiens, on the D919 road

== Population ==
Historical population
Year	Pop.	±% p.a.
1968	123	—
1975	96	−3.48%
1982	80	−2.57%
1990	92	+1.76%
1999	94	+0.24%
2007	103	+1.15%
2012	126	+4.11%
2017	144	+2.71%
2023	141	−0.35%
Source: INSEE

== See also ==
- Communes of the Somme department
