= Offignies =

- Commune
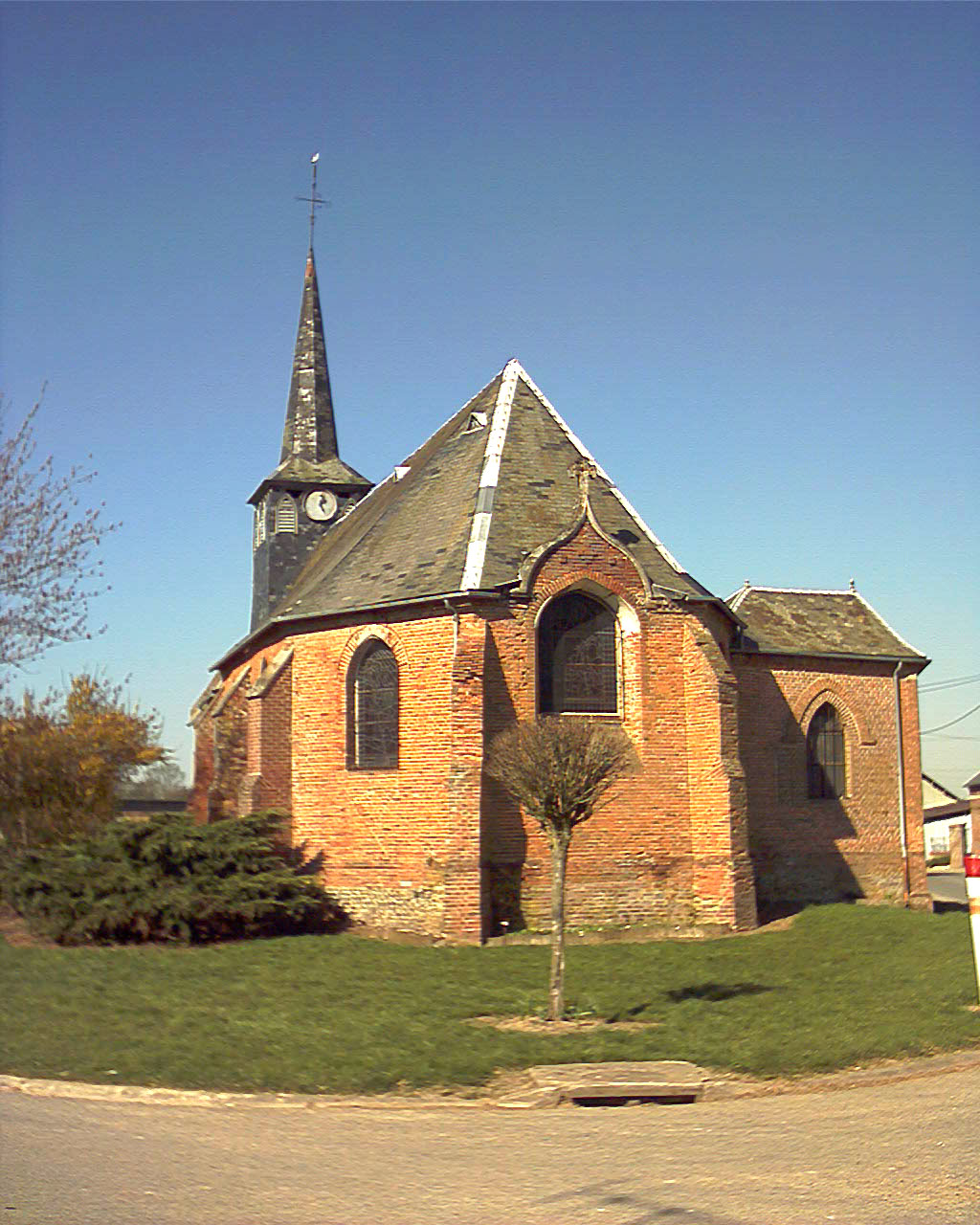
- The church in Offignies

- Coat of arms
- Location of Offignies
- Location within France Location within Hauts-de-France
- Coordinates: 49°47′58″N 1°51′09″E
- Country: France
- Region: Hauts-de-France
- Department: Somme
- Arrondissement: Amiens
- Canton: Poix-de-Picardie
- Intercommunality: CC Somme Sud-Ouest

Government
  - Mayor (2020–2026): Michèle Herduin
- Area^{1}: 4.47 km^{2} (1.73 sq mi)
- Elevation: 202 m (663 ft)
- Highest elevation: 206 m (676 ft)
- Lowest elevation: 177 m (581 ft)
- Population (2023): 83
  - Density: 19/km^{2} (48/sq mi)
- Time zone: UTC+01:00 (CET)
  - Summer (DST): UTC+02:00 (CEST)
- INSEE/Postal code: 80604 /80290
- ^{1} French Land Register data, which excludes lakes, ponds, glaciers > 1 km^{2} (0.386 sq mi or 247 acres) and river estuaries.

Offignies (French pronunciation: [ɔfiɲi]) is a commune in the Somme department in Hauts-de-France in northern France.

== Geography ==
Offignies is situated on the D92 road, some 22 miles (35 km) southwest of Amiens.

== Population ==
Historical population
Year	Pop.	±% p.a.
1968	97	—
1975	95	−0.30%
1982	75	−3.32%
1990	81	+0.97%
1999	70	−1.61%
2007	66	−0.73%
2012	67	+0.30%
2017	74	+2.01%
2023	83	+1.93%
Source: INSEE

== History ==
In 1972. Offignies absorbed the neighbouring commune of Orival. The church at Orival was destroyed during the Second World War, in 1940 and rebuilt in 1954 At Orival, traces of an 18th-century château and outbuildings may be seen. There are also outlines of Gallo-Roman farms and an old windmill.

== See also ==
- Communes of the Somme department
