= Saint-Aubin-Montenoy =

- Commune
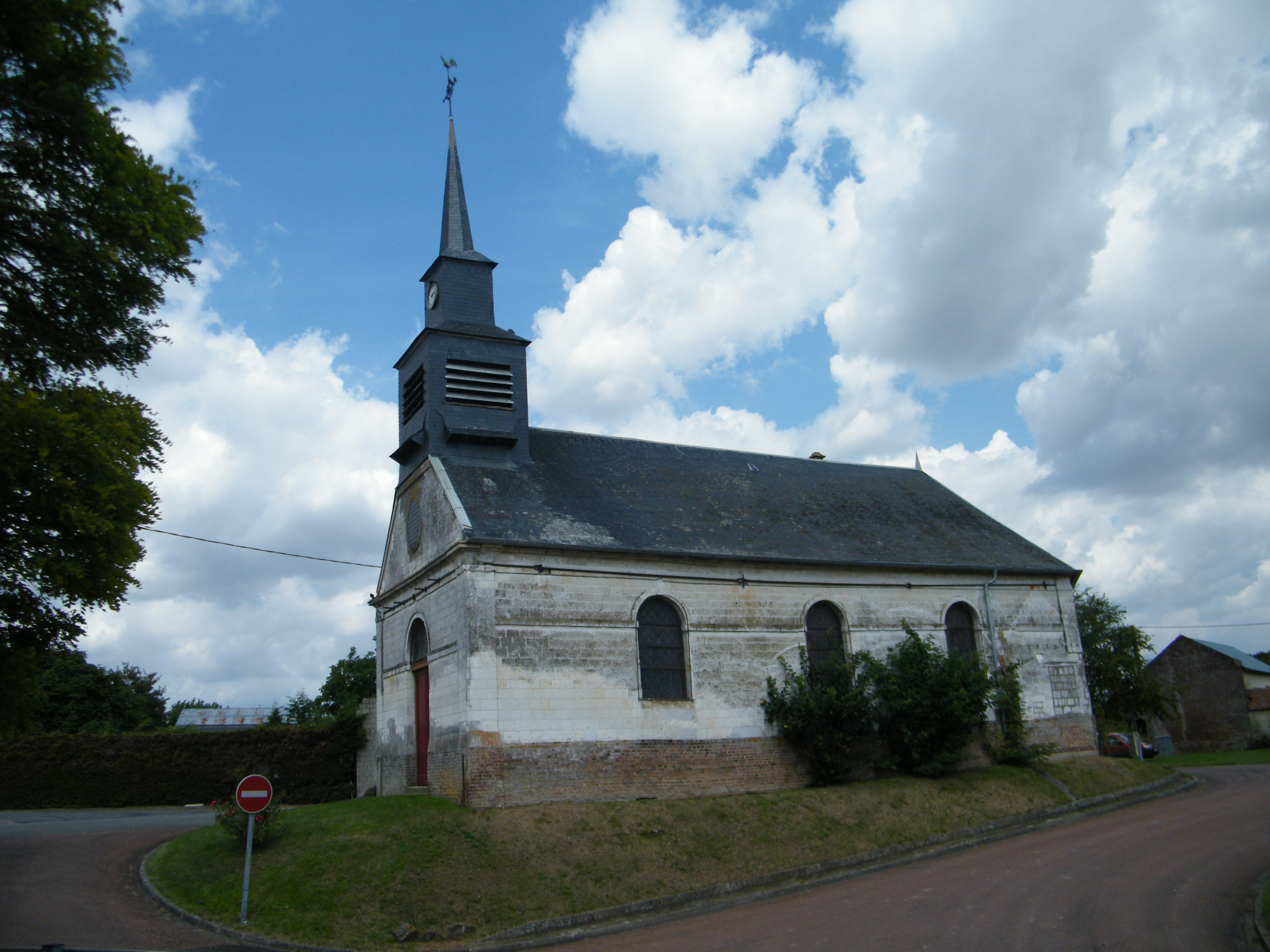
- The church in Saint-Aubin-Montenoy
- Location of Saint-Aubin-Montenoy
- Location within France Location within Hauts-de-France
- Coordinates: 49°50′51″N 1°59′47″E
- Country: France
- Region: Hauts-de-France
- Department: Somme
- Arrondissement: Amiens
- Canton: Ailly-sur-Somme
- Intercommunality: CC Somme Sud-Ouest

Government
  - Mayor (2020–2026): Vincent Viltart
- Area^{1}: 10.41 km^{2} (4.02 sq mi)
- Elevation: 124 m (407 ft)
- Highest elevation: 160 m (520 ft)
- Lowest elevation: 66 m (217 ft)
- Population (2023): 218
  - Density: 20.9/km^{2} (54.2/sq mi)
- Time zone: UTC+01:00 (CET)
  - Summer (DST): UTC+02:00 (CEST)
- INSEE/Postal code: 80698 /80540
- ^{1} French Land Register data, which excludes lakes, ponds, glaciers > 1 km^{2} (0.386 sq mi or 247 acres) and river estuaries.

Saint-Aubin-Montenoy (French pronunciation: [sɛ̃.t‿obɛ̃ mɔ̃tnwa]; Picard: Saint-Aubin-Montenoé) is a commune in the Somme department in Hauts-de-France in northern France.

== Geography ==
The commune is situated 14 miles (23 km) southwest of Amiens, on the D156 road.

The area is 10.41 km^{2}. It is situated at an elevation of 135 meters.

== Population ==
Historical population
Year	Pop.	±% p.a.
1968	208	—
1975	214	+0.41%
1982	216	+0.13%
1990	215	−0.06%
1999	209	−0.31%
2007	205	−0.24%
2012	227	+2.06%
2017	225	−0.18%
2023	218	−0.53%
Source: INSEE

== See also ==
- Communes of the Somme department
