= Lachapelle, Somme =

Lachapelle
- Commune
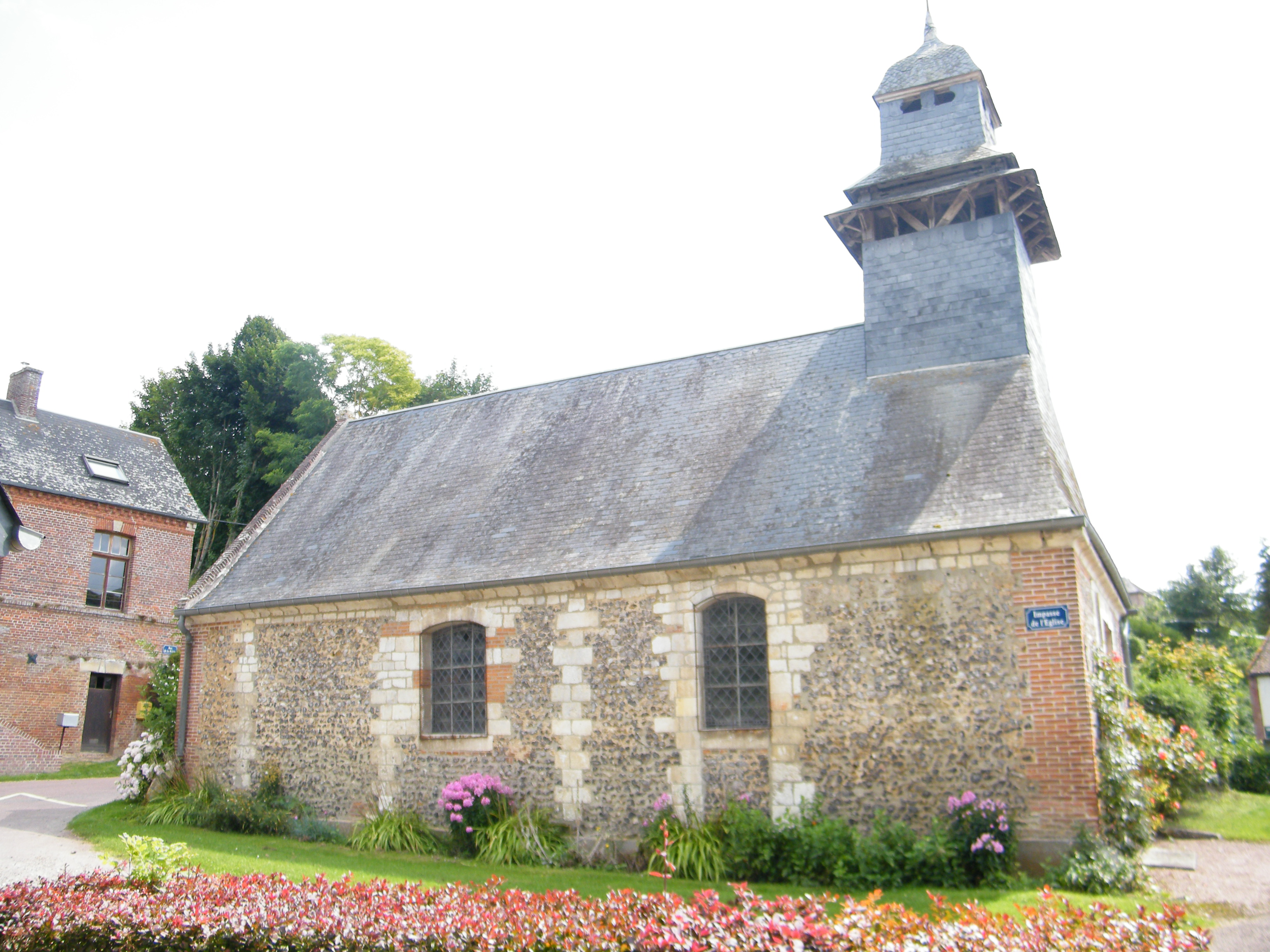
- The church in Lachapelle
- Location of Lachapelle
- Location within France Location within Hauts-de-France
- Coordinates: 49°45′57″N 1°57′29″E
- Country: France
- Region: Hauts-de-France
- Department: Somme
- Arrondissement: Amiens
- Canton: Poix-de-Picardie
- Intercommunality: CC Somme Sud-Ouest

Government
  - Mayor (2020–2026): Jérémie Morard
- Area^{1}: 2.51 km^{2} (0.97 sq mi)
- Elevation: 1,180 m (3,870 ft)
- Highest elevation: 183 m (600 ft)
- Lowest elevation: 109 m (358 ft)
- Population (2023): 87
  - Density: 35/km^{2} (90/sq mi)
- Time zone: UTC+01:00 (CET)
  - Summer (DST): UTC+02:00 (CEST)
- INSEE/Postal code: 80455 /80290
- ^{1} French Land Register data, which excludes lakes, ponds, glaciers > 1 km^{2} (0.386 sq mi or 247 acres) and river estuaries.

Lachapelle (French pronunciation: [laʃapɛl]) is a commune in the Somme department in Hauts-de-France in northern France.

== Geography ==
Lachapelle lies on the banks of the river Poix, at the junction of the D919 and D266 roads, some 20 miles (32 km) southwest of Amiens.

== Population ==
Historical population
Year	Pop.	±% p.a.
1968	47	—
1975	53	+1.73%
1982	48	−1.41%
1990	42	−1.66%
1999	51	+2.18%
2007	66	+3.28%
2012	70	+1.18%
2017	85	+3.96%
2023	87	+0.39%
Source: INSEE

== See also ==
- Communes of the Somme department
