= Thieulloy-l'Abbaye =

- Commune
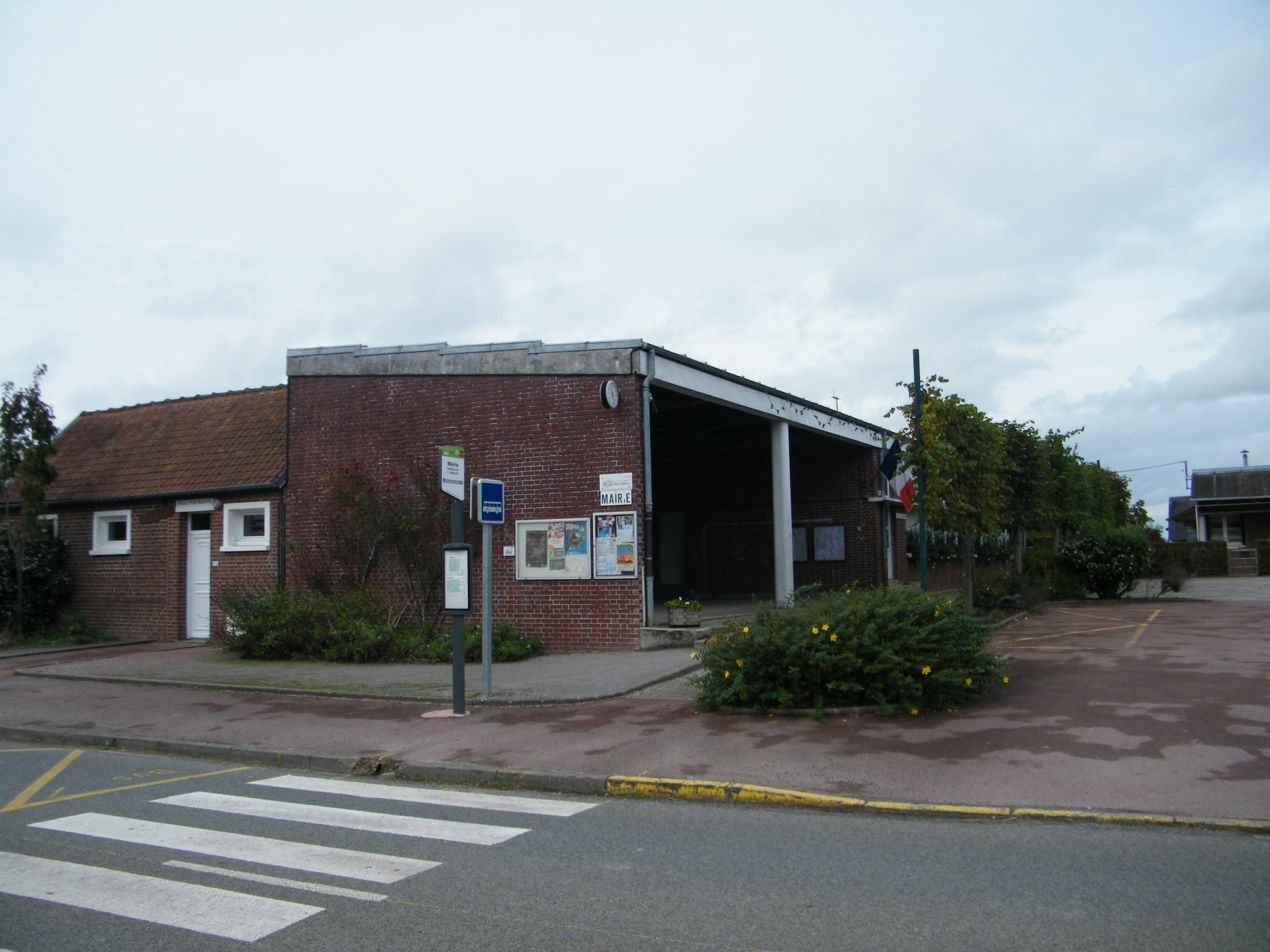
- The town hall and school in Thieulloy-l'Abbaye
- Location of Thieulloy-l'Abbaye
- Location within France Location within Hauts-de-France
- Coordinates: 49°49′34″N 1°56′44″E
- Country: France
- Region: Hauts-de-France
- Department: Somme
- Arrondissement: Amiens
- Canton: Poix-de-Picardie
- Intercommunality: CC Somme Sud-Ouest

Government
  - Mayor (2020–2026): Hervé Hesse
- Area^{1}: 14.66 km^{2} (5.66 sq mi)
- Elevation: 179 m (587 ft)
- Highest elevation: 182 m (597 ft)
- Lowest elevation: 122 m (400 ft)
- Population (2023): 380
  - Density: 26/km^{2} (67/sq mi)
- Time zone: UTC+01:00 (CET)
  - Summer (DST): UTC+02:00 (CEST)
- INSEE/Postal code: 80754 /80640
- ^{1} French Land Register data, which excludes lakes, ponds, glaciers > 1 km^{2} (0.386 sq mi or 247 acres) and river estuaries.

Thieulloy-l'Abbaye (French pronunciation: [tjœlwa labei]) is a commune in the Somme department in Hauts-de-France in northern France.

== Geography ==
The commune is situated 15 miles (24 km) southwest of Amiens, on the D51 road

== Population ==
Historical population
Year	Pop.	±% p.a.
1968	386	—
1975	370	−0.60%
1982	287	−3.56%
1990	282	−0.22%
1999	276	−0.24%
2007	302	+1.13%
2012	320	+1.16%
2017	372	+3.06%
2023	380	+0.36%
Source: INSEE

== See also ==
- Communes of the Somme department
