= Caulières =

- Commune
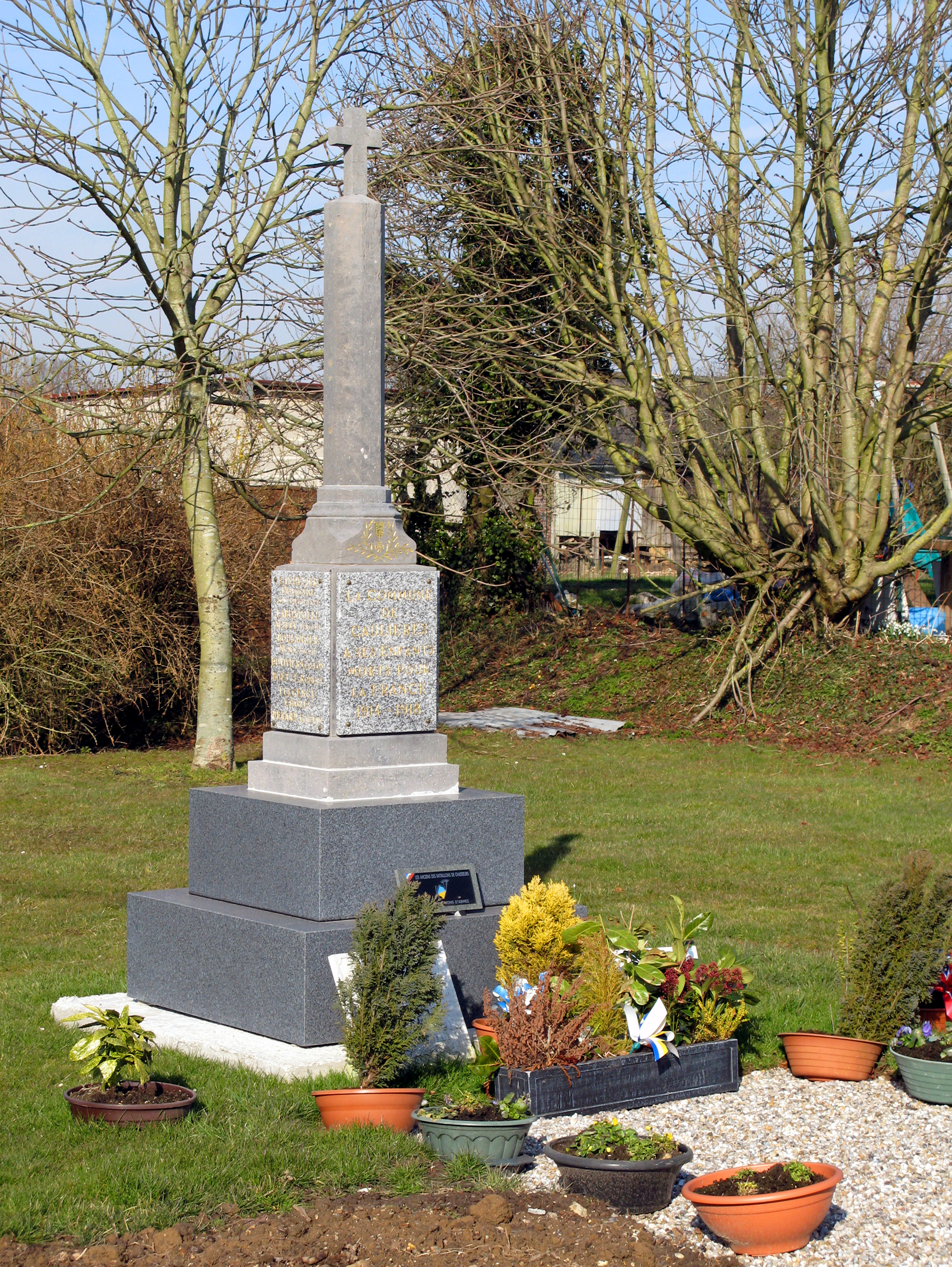
- The monument to the dead, in Caulières

- Coat of arms
- Location of Caulières
- Location within France Location within Hauts-de-France
- Coordinates: 49°46′51″N 1°53′25″E
- Country: France
- Region: Hauts-de-France
- Department: Somme
- Arrondissement: Amiens
- Canton: Poix-de-Picardie
- Intercommunality: CC Somme Sud-Ouest

Government
  - Mayor (2020–2026): Pierre Robitaille
- Area^{1}: 5.41 km^{2} (2.09 sq mi)
- Elevation: 184 m (604 ft)
- Highest elevation: 193 m (633 ft)
- Lowest elevation: 168 m (551 ft)
- Population (2023): 223
  - Density: 41.2/km^{2} (107/sq mi)
- Time zone: UTC+01:00 (CET)
  - Summer (DST): UTC+02:00 (CEST)
- INSEE/Postal code: 80179 /80290
- ^{1} French Land Register data, which excludes lakes, ponds, glaciers > 1 km^{2} (0.386 sq mi or 247 acres) and river estuaries.

Caulières (French pronunciation: [koljɛʁ]; Picard: Queuillère) is a commune in the Somme department in Hauts-de-France in northern France.

== Geography ==
Caulières is situated on the N29 road, some 20 miles (32 km) southwest of Amiens.

== Population ==
Historical population
Year	Pop.	±% p.a.
1968	214	—
1975	212	−0.13%
1982	177	−2.54%
1990	188	+0.76%
1999	186	−0.12%
2007	208	+1.41%
2012	210	+0.19%
2017	206	−0.38%
2023	223	+1.33%
Source: INSEE

== See also ==
- Communes of the Somme department
