= Croixrault =

- Commune
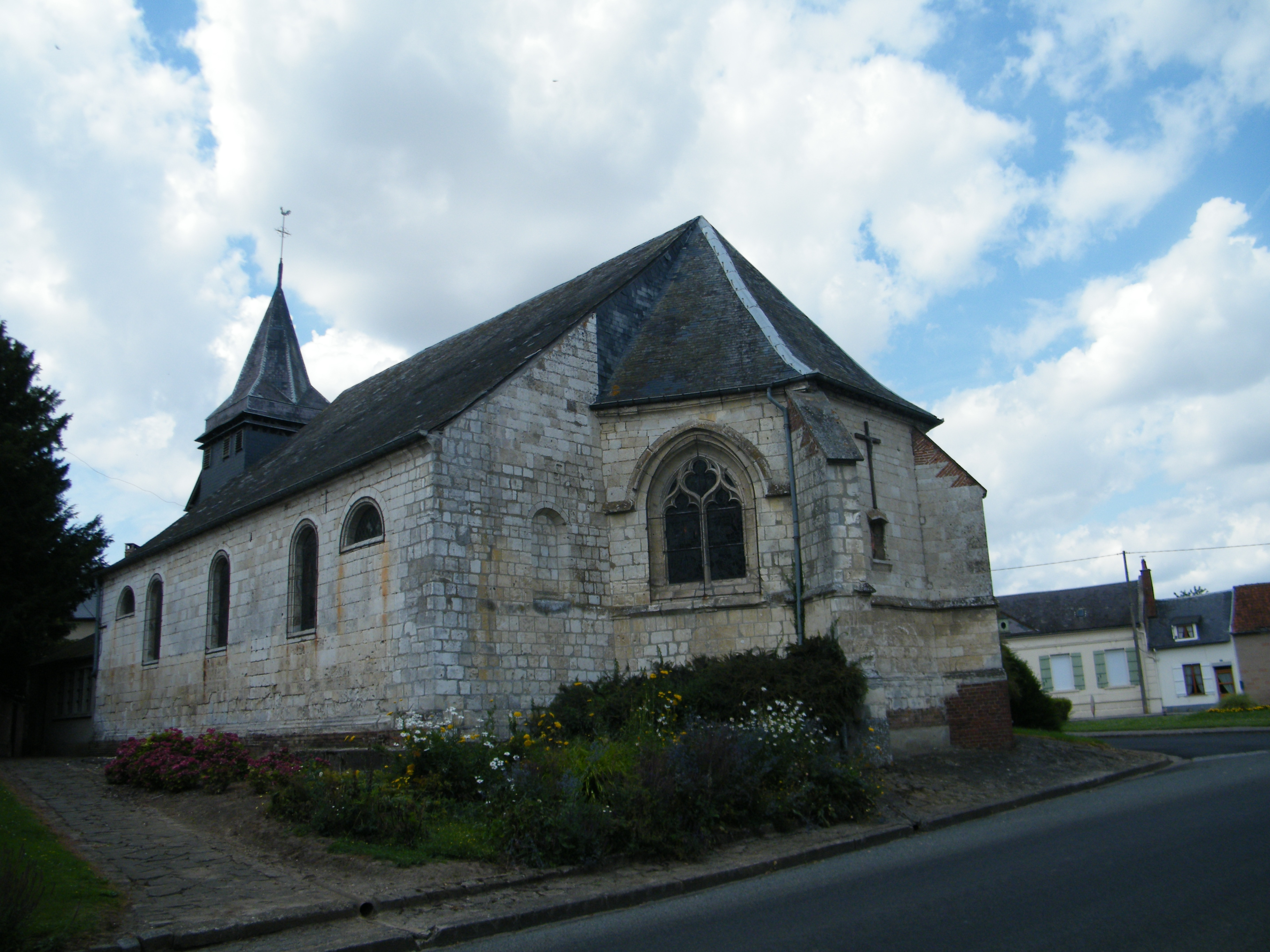
- The church in Croixrault
- Location of Croixrault
- Location within France Location within Hauts-de-France
- Coordinates: 49°47′31″N 1°59′31″E
- Country: France
- Region: Hauts-de-France
- Department: Somme
- Arrondissement: Amiens
- Canton: Poix-de-Picardie
- Intercommunality: CC Somme Sud-Ouest

Government
  - Mayor (2020–2026): Didier Darsin
- Area^{1}: 8.96 km^{2} (3.46 sq mi)
- Elevation: 183 m (600 ft)
- Highest elevation: 187 m (614 ft)
- Lowest elevation: 111 m (364 ft)
- Population (2023): 460
  - Density: 51/km^{2} (130/sq mi)
- Time zone: UTC+01:00 (CET)
  - Summer (DST): UTC+02:00 (CEST)
- INSEE/Postal code: 80227 /80290
- ^{1} French Land Register data, which excludes lakes, ponds, glaciers > 1 km^{2} (0.386 sq mi or 247 acres) and river estuaries.

Croixrault (French pronunciation: [kʁwaʁo]; Picard: Cloreu) is a commune in the Somme department in Hauts-de-France in northern France.

== Geography ==
Croixrault is situated on the D341 and D141 crossroads, some 18 miles (29 km) southwest of Amiens.

The commune is served by exit 13 of the A29 freeway. This connects the old route of the former Route Nationale 1 with the former Route Nationale 29. The freeway also offers a service area. In 2019, Croixrault will be served by Trans'80 bus routes every day of the week, except Sundays and public holidays.

== Population ==
Historical population
Year	Pop.	±% p.a.
1968	372	—
1975	351	−0.83%
1982	365	+0.56%
1990	356	−0.31%
1999	355	−0.03%
2007	414	+1.94%
2012	438	+1.13%
2017	434	−0.18%
2023	460	+0.97%
Source: INSEE

== See also ==
- Communes of the Somme department
