= Saulchoy-sous-Poix =

- Commune
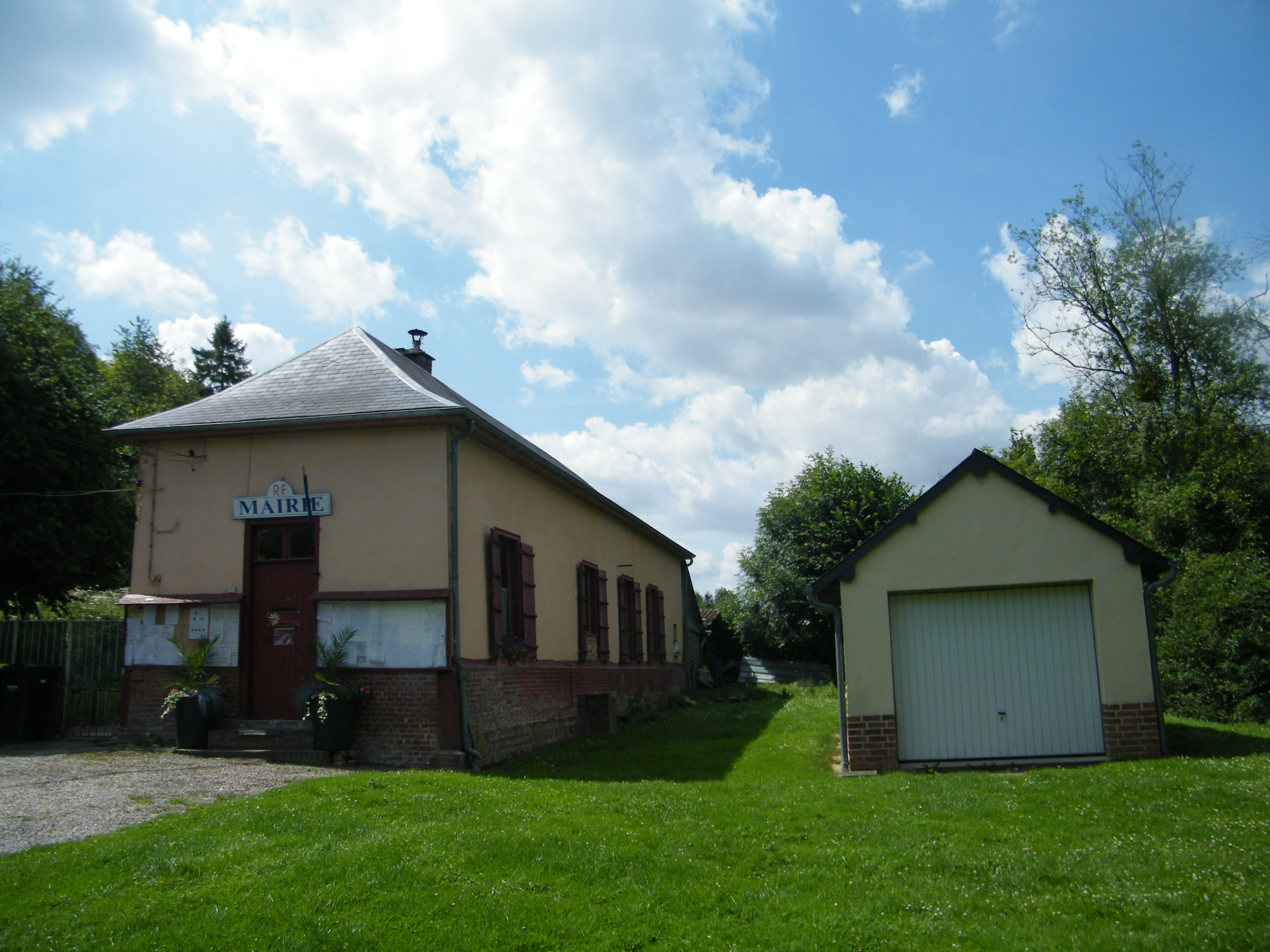
- The town hall in Saulchoy-sous-Poix
- Location of Saulchoy-sous-Poix
- Location within France Location within Hauts-de-France
- Coordinates: 49°45′27″N 1°56′13″E
- Country: France
- Region: Hauts-de-France
- Department: Somme
- Arrondissement: Amiens
- Canton: Poix-de-Picardie
- Intercommunality: CC Somme Sud-Ouest

Government
  - Mayor (2021–2026): Lionel Clabault
- Area^{1}: 3.72 km^{2} (1.44 sq mi)
- Elevation: 150 m (490 ft)
- Highest elevation: 186 m (610 ft)
- Lowest elevation: 117 m (384 ft)
- Population (2023): 74
  - Density: 20/km^{2} (52/sq mi)
- Time zone: UTC+01:00 (CET)
  - Summer (DST): UTC+02:00 (CEST)
- INSEE/Postal code: 80728 /80290
- ^{1} French Land Register data, which excludes lakes, ponds, glaciers > 1 km^{2} (0.386 sq mi or 247 acres) and river estuaries.

Saulchoy-sous-Poix (French pronunciation: [solʃwa su pwa], literally Saulchoy under Poix; Picard: Chauchoy-dsou-Poé) is a commune in the Somme department in Hauts-de-France in northern France.

== Geography ==
The commune is situated 26 kilometres (16 mi) southwest of Amiens, on the D266 road

== Population ==
Historical population
Year	Pop.	±% p.a.
1968	19	—
1975	22	+2.12%
1982	31	+5.02%
1990	32	+0.40%
1999	35	+1.00%
2007	48	+4.03%
2012	61	+4.91%
2017	71	+3.08%
2023	74	+0.69%
Source: INSEE

== See also ==
- Communes of the Somme department
