= Fourcigny =

- Commune
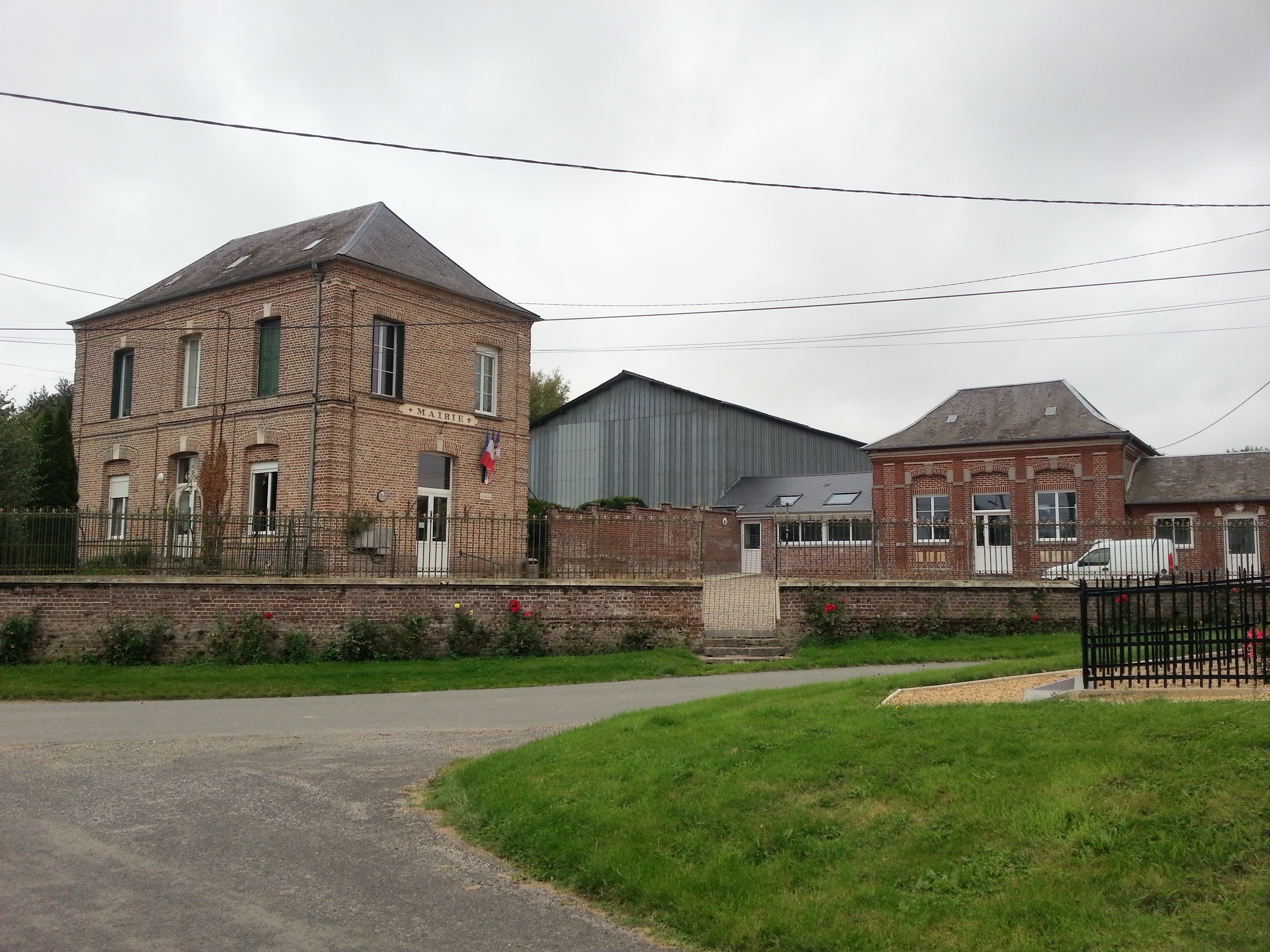
- The town hall and school in Fourcigny

- Coat of arms
- Location of Fourcigny
- Location within France Location within Hauts-de-France
- Coordinates: 49°45′37″N 1°49′36″E
- Country: France
- Region: Hauts-de-France
- Department: Somme
- Arrondissement: Amiens
- Canton: Poix-de-Picardie
- Intercommunality: CC Somme Sud-Ouest

Government
  - Mayor (2022–2026): Jack Warnault
- Area^{1}: 4.55 km^{2} (1.76 sq mi)
- Elevation: 142 m (466 ft)
- Highest elevation: 214 m (702 ft)
- Lowest elevation: 193 m (633 ft)
- Population (2023): 181
  - Density: 39.8/km^{2} (103/sq mi)
- Time zone: UTC+01:00 (CET)
  - Summer (DST): UTC+02:00 (CEST)
- INSEE/Postal code: 80340 /80290
- ^{1} French Land Register data, which excludes lakes, ponds, glaciers > 1 km^{2} (0.386 sq mi or 247 acres) and river estuaries.

Fourcigny (French pronunciation: [fuʁsiɲi]) is a commune in the Somme department in Hauts-de-France in northern France.

== Geography ==
Fourcigny is situated in the southeastern corner of the département, 26 miles (42 km) southwest of Amiens on the D98, a few hundred yards from the Oise department and a few miles from the border with the Seine-Maritime. The hamlet of Beaurepaire adjoins.

== Population ==
Historical population
Year	Pop.	±% p.a.
1968	164	—
1975	130	−3.26%
1982	131	+0.11%
1990	123	−0.78%
1999	131	+0.70%
2007	171	+3.39%
2012	188	+1.91%
2017	193	+0.53%
2023	181	−1.06%
Source: INSEE

== See also ==
- Communes of the Somme department
