= Lafresguimont-Saint-Martin =

- Commune
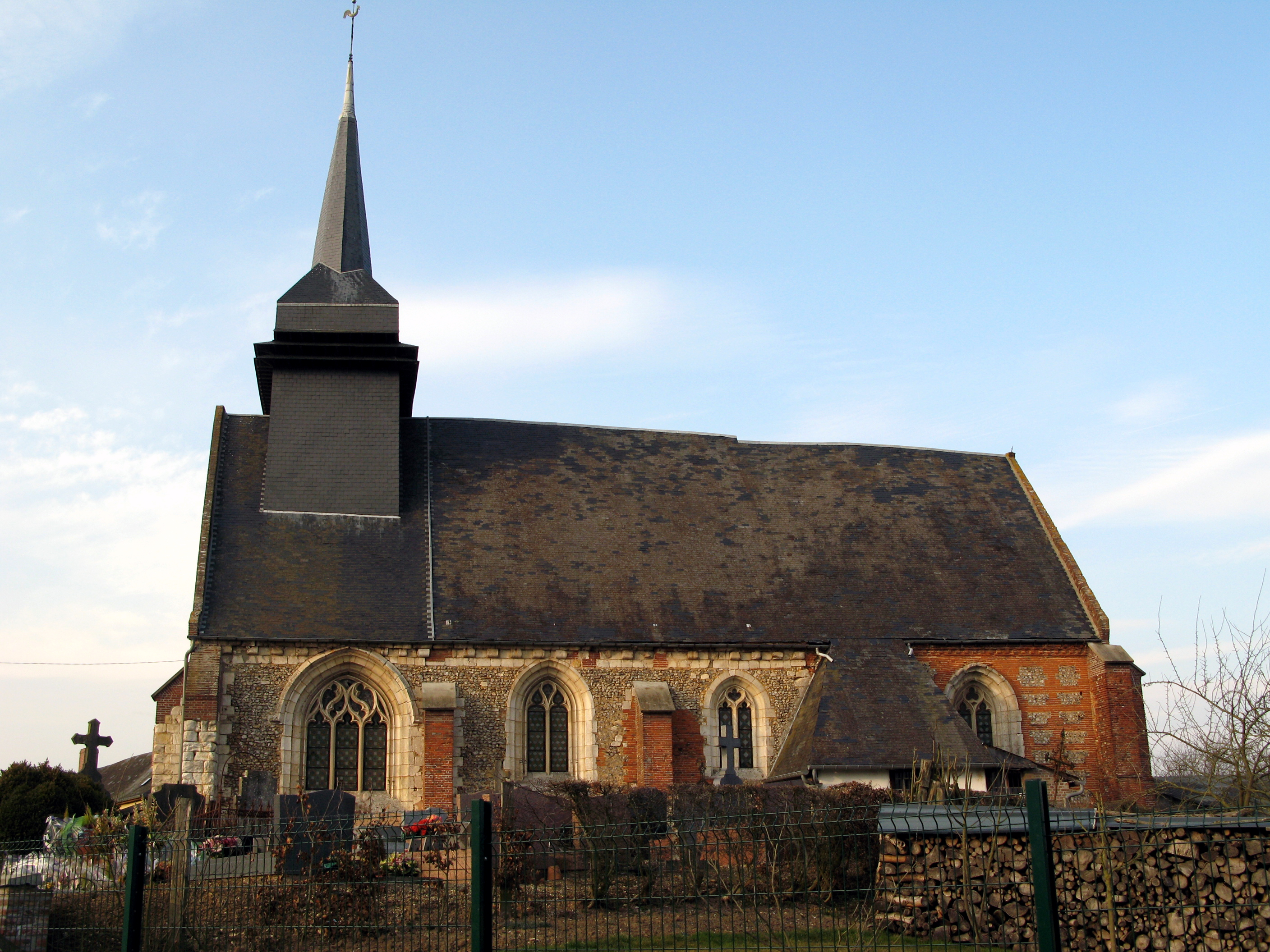
- The church in Lafresnoye
- Location of Lafresguimont-Saint-Martin
- Location within France Location within Hauts-de-France
- Coordinates: 49°48′58″N 1°48′35″E
- Country: France
- Region: Hauts-de-France
- Department: Somme
- Arrondissement: Amiens
- Canton: Poix-de-Picardie
- Intercommunality: CC Somme Sud-Ouest

Government
  - Mayor (2020–2026): Jannick Lefeuvre
- Area^{1}: 26.54 km^{2} (10.25 sq mi)
- Elevation: 185 m (607 ft)
- Highest elevation: 210 m (690 ft)
- Lowest elevation: 100 m (330 ft)
- Population (2023): 553
  - Density: 20.8/km^{2} (54.0/sq mi)
- Time zone: UTC+01:00 (CET)
  - Summer (DST): UTC+02:00 (CEST)
- INSEE/Postal code: 80456 /80430
- ^{1} French Land Register data, which excludes lakes, ponds, glaciers > 1 km^{2} (0.386 sq mi or 247 acres) and river estuaries.

Lafresguimont-Saint-Martin (French pronunciation: [lafʁɛɡimɔ̃ sɛ̃ maʁtɛ̃]; Picard: Lafrédjumint-Saint-Martin) is a commune in the Somme department in Hauts-de-France in northern France.

== Geography ==
The commune is situated at the junction of the D92 and the D178 roads, 40 kilometres (25 mi) southwest of Amiens.

== History ==
The commune was created by the amalgamation of four separate communes in 1972 : Montmarquet, Lafresnoye, Guibermesnil and Laboissière-Saint-Martin. The present name is a combination of the older names.

== Population ==
Historical population
Year	Pop.	±% p.a.
1968	604	—
1975	570	−0.82%
1982	501	−1.83%
1990	470	−0.80%
1999	445	−0.61%
2007	508	+1.67%
2012	503	−0.20%
2017	550	+1.80%
2023	553	+0.09%
Source: INSEE

== See also ==
- Communes of the Somme department
