= Hescamps =

- Commune
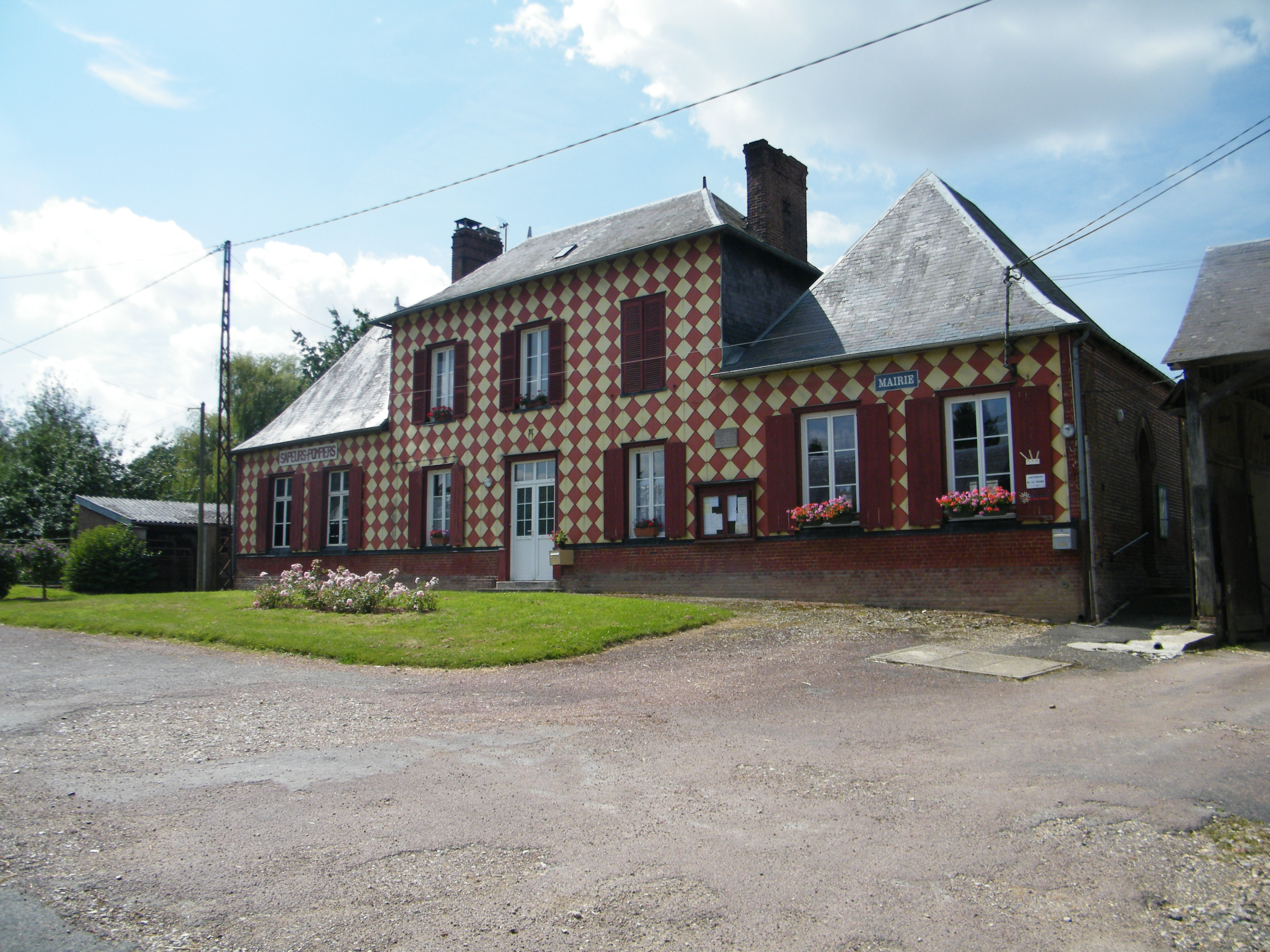
- The town hall in Hescamps
- Location of Hescamps
- Location within France Location within Hauts-de-France
- Coordinates: 49°43′46″N 1°52′20″E
- Country: France
- Region: Hauts-de-France
- Department: Somme
- Arrondissement: Amiens
- Canton: Poix-de-Picardie
- Intercommunality: CC Somme Sud-Ouest

Government
  - Mayor (2020–2026): Jocelyne Ternois
- Area^{1}: 34.56 km^{2} (13.34 sq mi)
- Elevation: 200 m (660 ft)
- Highest elevation: 211 m (692 ft)
- Lowest elevation: 127 m (417 ft)
- Population (2023): 522
  - Density: 15.1/km^{2} (39.1/sq mi)
- Time zone: UTC+01:00 (CET)
  - Summer (DST): UTC+02:00 (CEST)
- INSEE/Postal code: 80436 /80290
- ^{1} French Land Register data, which excludes lakes, ponds, glaciers > 1 km^{2} (0.386 sq mi or 247 acres) and river estuaries.

Hescamps is a commune in the Somme department in Hauts-de-France in northern France.

== Geography ==
Hescamps is situated on the D257 road, some 22 miles (35 km) southwest of Amiens.

The Plateau Picard near the border between the departments of the Somme, the Oise and the Seine-Maritime, easily accessible via the old national road 15a (now DR 1015) and 319 (now DR 919), or by Highway A29 .

The nearest train station is in Fouilloy, at 3 km.

The common Hescamps is constituted by the four former municipalities of the Somme in 1972:

- Agnières
- Frettemolle
- Souplicourt.

The stream of Évoissons rises to Handicourt.

== Population ==
Historical population
Year	Pop.	±% p.a.
1968	558	—
1975	517	−1.08%
1982	434	−2.47%
1990	404	−0.89%
1999	434	+0.80%
2007	470	+1.00%
2012	530	+2.43%
2017	516	−0.53%
2023	522	+0.19%
Source: INSEE

== See also ==
- Communes of the Somme department
