= Brocourt =

- Commune
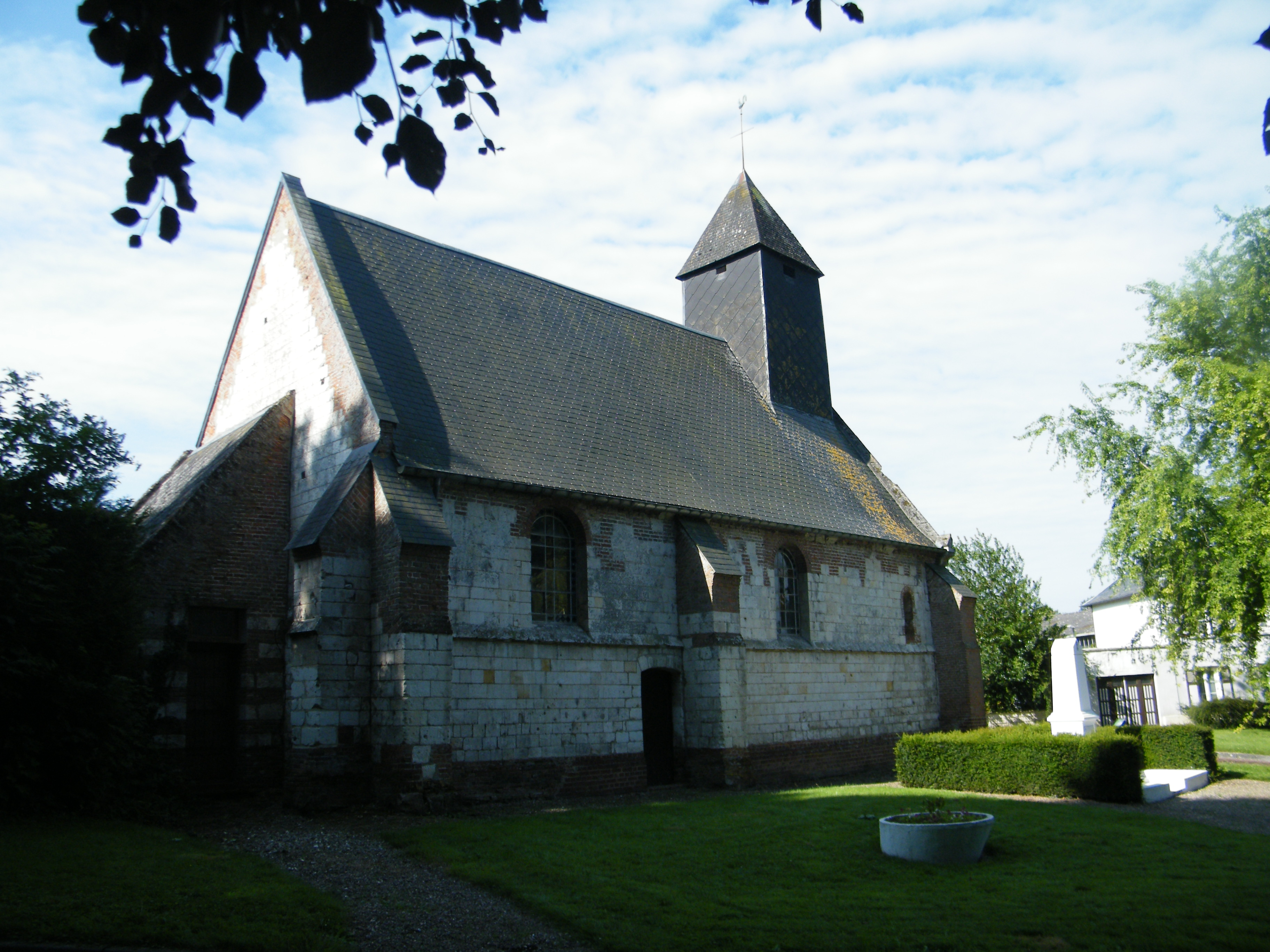
- The church in Brocourt
- Location of Brocourt
- Location within France Location within Hauts-de-France
- Coordinates: 49°51′14″N 1°49′23″E
- Country: France
- Region: Hauts-de-France
- Department: Somme
- Arrondissement: Amiens
- Canton: Poix-de-Picardie
- Intercommunality: CC Somme Sud-Ouest

Government
  - Mayor (2020–2026): Firmin Boucry
- Area^{1}: 2.41 km^{2} (0.93 sq mi)
- Elevation: 101 m (331 ft)
- Highest elevation: 176 m (577 ft)
- Lowest elevation: 107 m (351 ft)
- Population (2023): 109
  - Density: 45.2/km^{2} (117/sq mi)
- Time zone: UTC+01:00 (CET)
  - Summer (DST): UTC+02:00 (CEST)
- INSEE/Postal code: 80143 /80430
- ^{1} French Land Register data, which excludes lakes, ponds, glaciers > 1 km^{2} (0.386 sq mi or 247 acres) and river estuaries.

Brocourt (French pronunciation: [bʁɔkuʁ]) is a commune in the Somme department in Hauts-de-France in northern France.

== Geography ==
Brocourt is situated on the D211 road, some 28 miles (45 km) west of Amiens.

== Population ==
Historical population
Year	Pop.	±% p.a.
1968	107	—
1975	114	+0.91%
1982	106	−1.03%
1990	129	+2.49%
1999	120	−0.80%
2007	101	−2.13%
2012	100	−0.20%
2017	98	−0.40%
2023	109	+1.79%
Source: INSEE

== See also ==
- Communes of the Somme department
