= Canton of Poix-de-Picardie =

Coordinates: 49°46′22″N 1°56′04″E

Poix-de-Picardie
- Canton
- Interactive map of Poix-de-Picardie
- Country: France
- Region: Hauts-de-France
- Department: Somme
- No. of communes: {{{nbcomm}}}
- Area: 523.41 km^{2} (202.09 sq mi)
- Population (2023): 20,173
  - Density: 38.541/km^{2} (99.822/sq mi)
- INSEE code: 80 21

The Canton of Poix-de-Picardie is a canton situated in the department of the Somme and in the Hauts-de-France region of northern France.

== Geography ==
The canton is organised around the commune of Poix-de-Picardie.

== Composition ==
At the French canton reorganisation which came into effect in March 2015, the canton was expanded from 28 to 79 communes:

- Andainville
- Arguel
- Aumâtre
- Aumont
- Avesnes-Chaussoy
- Beaucamps-le-Jeune
- Beaucamps-le-Vieux
- Belloy-Saint-Léonard
- Bergicourt
- Bermesnil
- Bettembos
- Blangy-sous-Poix
- Brocourt
- Bussy-lès-Poix
- Cannessières
- Caulières
- Cerisy-Buleux
- Courcelles-sous-Moyencourt
- Croixrault
- Dromesnil
- Épaumesnil
- Éplessier
- Équennes-Éramecourt
- Étréjust
- Famechon
- Fontaine-le-Sec
- Forceville-en-Vimeu
- Foucaucourt-Hors-Nesle
- Fourcigny
- Framicourt
- Fresnes-Tilloloy
- Fresneville
- Fresnoy-Andainville
- Frettecuisse
- Fricamps
- Gauville
- Guizancourt
- Hescamps
- Heucourt-Croquoison
- Hornoy-le-Bourg
- Inval-Boiron
- Lachapelle
- Lafresguimont-Saint-Martin
- Lamaronde
- Lignières-Châtelain
- Lignières-en-Vimeu
- Liomer
- Marlers
- Le Mazis
- Meigneux
- Méréaucourt
- Méricourt-en-Vimeu
- Morvillers-Saint-Saturnin
- Mouflières
- Moyencourt-lès-Poix
- Nesle-l'Hôpital
- Neslette
- Neuville-au-Bois
- Neuville-Coppegueule
- Offignies
- Oisemont
- Poix-de-Picardie
- Le Quesne
- Rambures
- Saint-Aubin-Rivière
- Sainte-Segrée
- Saint-Germain-sur-Bresle
- Saint-Léger-sur-Bresle
- Saint-Maulvis
- Saulchoy-sous-Poix
- Senarpont
- Thieulloy-l'Abbaye
- Thieulloy-la-Ville
- Le Translay
- Vergies
- Villeroy
- Villers-Campsart
- Vraignes-lès-Hornoy
- Woirel

== Population ==
Historical population
Year	Pop.	±% p.a.
2013	20,739	—
2018	20,701	−0.04%
Source: INSEE

== See also ==
- Somme
- Arrondissements of the Somme department
- Cantons of the Somme department
- Communes of the Somme department
