= Méréaucourt =

- Commune
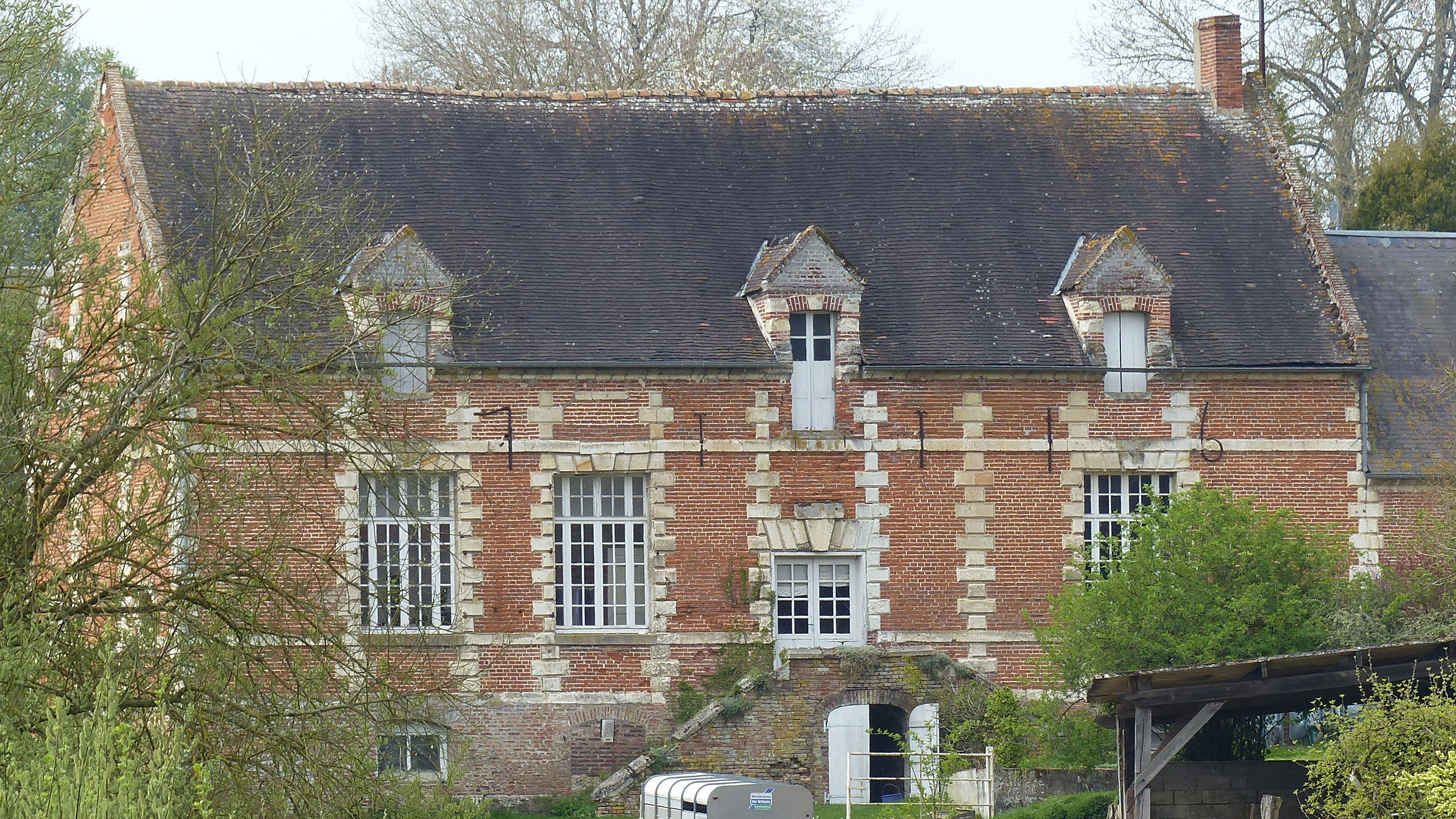
- A farmhouse in Méréaucourt
- Location of Méréaucourt
- Location within France Location within Hauts-de-France
- Coordinates: 49°43′48″N 1°56′06″E
- Country: France
- Region: Hauts-de-France
- Department: Somme
- Arrondissement: Amiens
- Canton: Poix-de-Picardie
- Intercommunality: Somme Sud-Ouest

Government
  - Mayor (2020–2026): Marc Blarel
- Area^{1}: 3.04 km^{2} (1.17 sq mi)
- Elevation: 97 m (318 ft)
- Highest elevation: 187 m (614 ft)
- Lowest elevation: 120 m (390 ft)
- Population (2023): 9
  - Density: 3.0/km^{2} (7.7/sq mi)
- Time zone: UTC+01:00 (CET)
  - Summer (DST): UTC+02:00 (CEST)
- INSEE/Postal code: 80528 /80290
- ^{1} French Land Register data, which excludes lakes, ponds, glaciers > 1 km^{2} (0.386 sq mi or 247 acres) and river estuaries.

Méréaucourt (French pronunciation: [meʁeokuʁ]) is a commune in the Somme department in Hauts-de-France in northern France.

== Geography ==
The commune is situated on the D264 road, some 23 miles (37 km) southwest of Amiens. This village is one of the least populous communes in the Hauts-de-France region (9 people in 2023).

== History ==
A priory was built here in the 12th century, belonging to the abbey of Saint-Valery-sur-Somme. It comprised a church, cemetery and farm.

== Population ==
Historical population
Year	Pop.	±% p.a.
1968	27	—
1975	22	−2.88%
1982	18	−2.83%
1990	9	−8.30%
1999	10	+1.18%
2007	14	+4.30%
2012	6	−15.59%
2017	6	+0.00%
2023	9	+6.99%
Source: INSEE

== See also ==
- Communes of the Somme department
