= Lamaronde =

- Commune
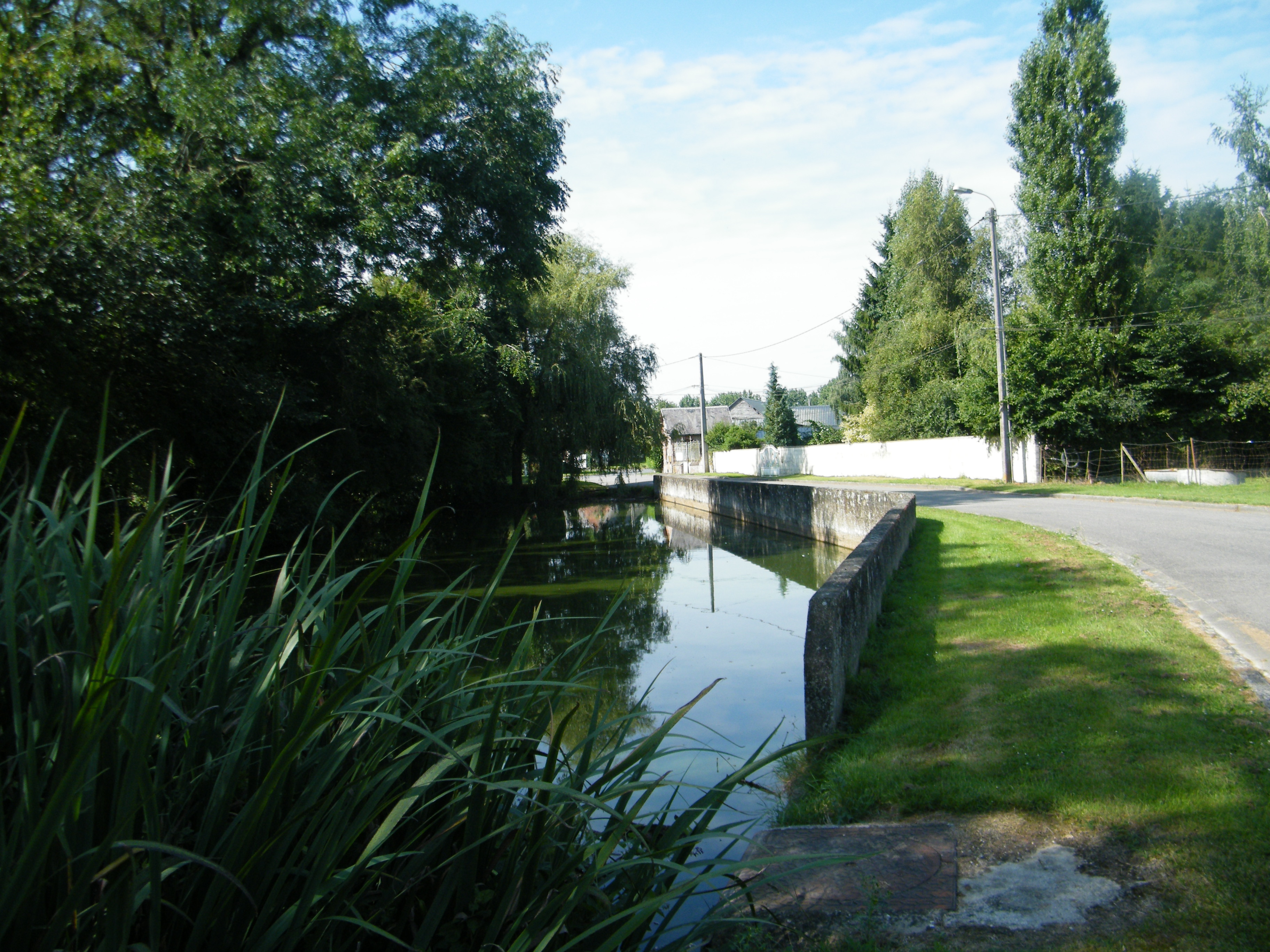
- The lake in Lamaronde
- Location of Lamaronde
- Location within France Location within Hauts-de-France
- Coordinates: 49°48′22″N 1°54′04″E
- Country: France
- Region: Hauts-de-France
- Department: Somme
- Arrondissement: Amiens
- Canton: Poix-de-Picardie
- Intercommunality: CC Somme Sud-Ouest

Government
  - Mayor (2020–2026): Xavier Despreaux
- Area^{1}: 2.55 km^{2} (0.98 sq mi)
- Elevation: 185 m (607 ft)
- Highest elevation: 187 m (614 ft)
- Lowest elevation: 164 m (538 ft)
- Population (2023): 51
  - Density: 20/km^{2} (52/sq mi)
- Time zone: UTC+01:00 (CET)
  - Summer (DST): UTC+02:00 (CEST)
- INSEE/Postal code: 80460 /80290
- ^{1} French Land Register data, which excludes lakes, ponds, glaciers > 1 km^{2} (0.386 sq mi or 247 acres) and river estuaries.

Lamaronde (French pronunciation: [lamaʁɔ̃d]; Picard: L’Maronde) is a commune in the Somme department in Hauts-de-France in northern France.

== Geography ==
Lamaronde is situated on the D189 road, some 24 miles (39 km) south of Abbeville and less than one mile from the A29 autoroute.

== Population ==
Historical population
Year	Pop.	±% p.a.
1968	89	—
1975	81	−1.34%
1982	72	−1.67%
1990	66	−1.08%
1999	68	+0.33%
2007	76	+1.40%
2012	64	−3.38%
2017	65	+0.31%
2023	51	−3.96%
Source: INSEE

== See also ==
- Communes of the Somme department
