= Lignières-Châtelain =

Lignières-Châtelain Lignère-Catelain (Picard)
- Commune
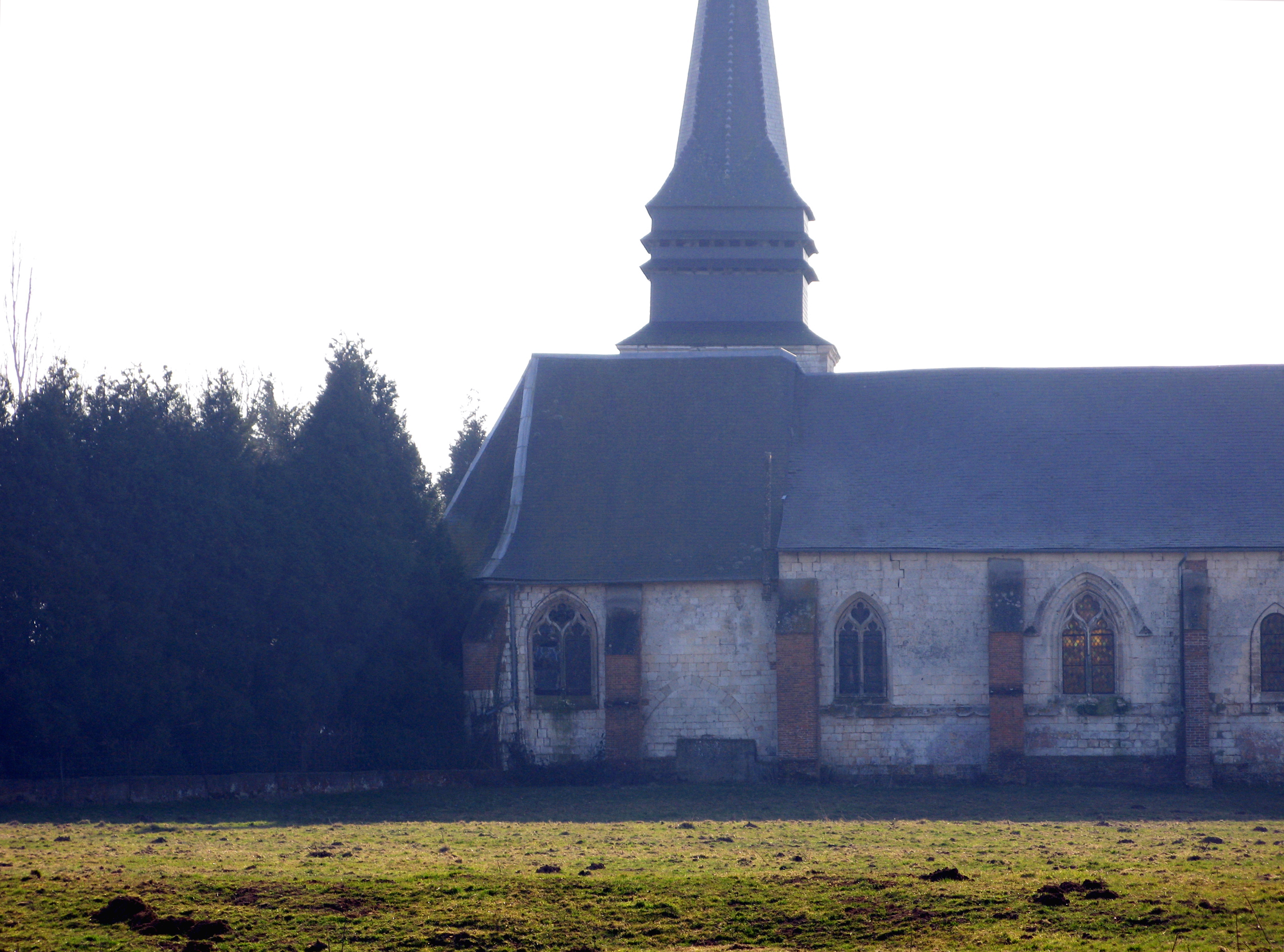
- The church in Lignières-Châtelain

- Coat of arms
- Location of Lignières-Châtelain
- Location within France Location within Hauts-de-France
- Coordinates: 49°46′32″N 1°51′49″E
- Country: France
- Region: Hauts-de-France
- Department: Somme
- Arrondissement: Amiens
- Canton: Poix-de-Picardie
- Intercommunality: Somme Sud-Ouest

Government
  - Mayor (2020–2026): Hubert Avet
- Area^{1}: 6.54 km^{2} (2.53 sq mi)
- Elevation: 195 m (640 ft)
- Highest elevation: 209 m (686 ft)
- Lowest elevation: 186 m (610 ft)
- Population (2023): 346
  - Density: 52.9/km^{2} (137/sq mi)
- Demonym(s): Ligniérois, Ligniéroises
- Time zone: UTC+01:00 (CET)
  - Summer (DST): UTC+02:00 (CEST)
- INSEE/Postal code: 80479 /80290
- ^{1} French Land Register data, which excludes lakes, ponds, glaciers > 1 km^{2} (0.386 sq mi or 247 acres) and river estuaries.

Lignières-Châtelain (French: [liɲjɛʁ ʃɑtlɛ̃]; Picard: Lignère-Catelain) is a commune in the Somme department in Hauts-de-France in northern France.

== Geography ==
The commune is situated on the N29 road, some 23 miles (37 km) southwest of Amiens.

== Population ==
Historical population
Year	Pop.	±% p.a.
1968	315	—
1975	295	−0.93%
1982	270	−1.26%
1990	272	+0.09%
1999	284	+0.48%
2007	360	+3.01%
2012	341	−1.08%
2017	385	+2.46%
2023	346	−1.76%
Source: INSEE

== Places of interest ==
- Church of Saint-Barthélémy

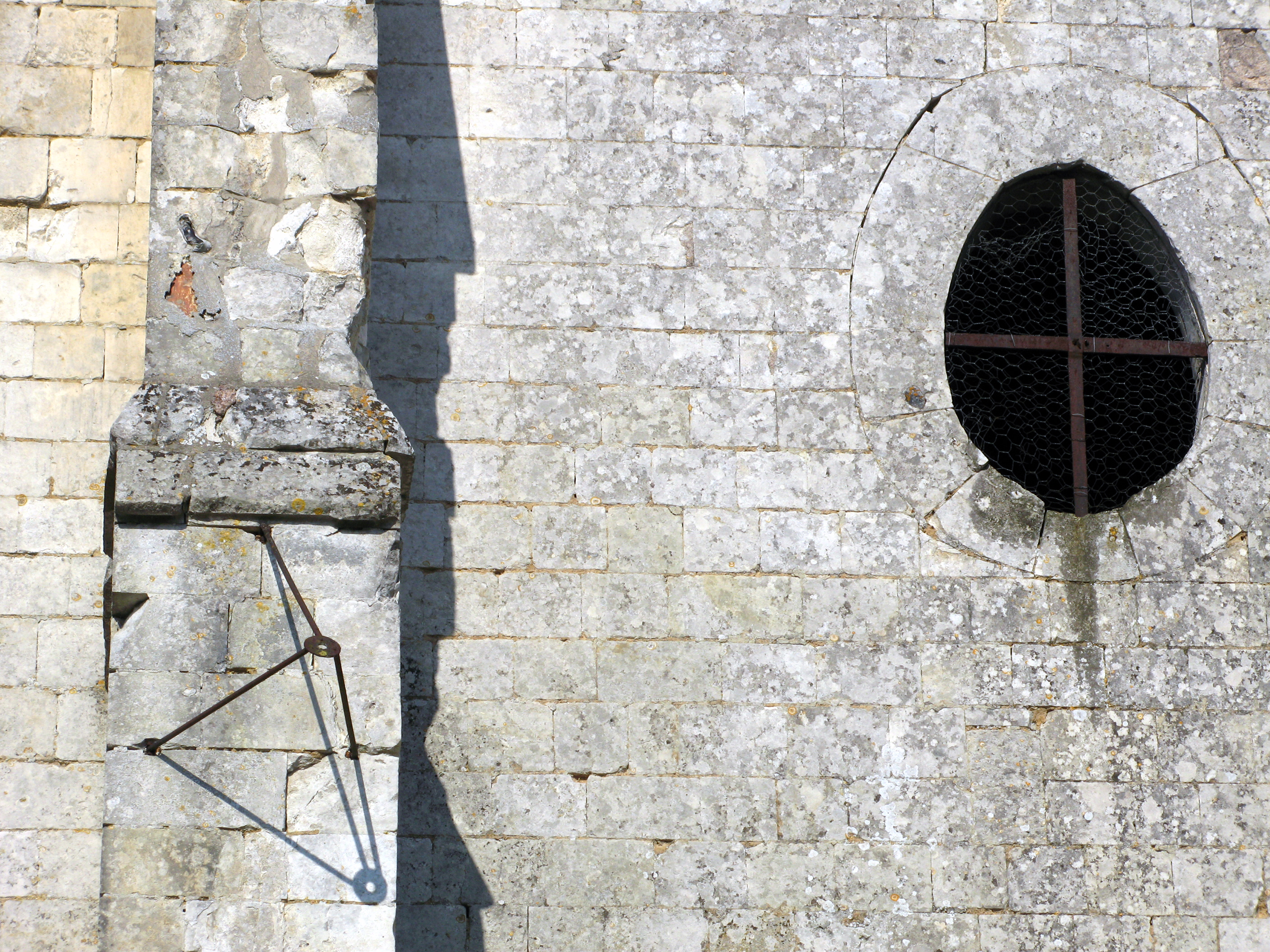
Sundial on the church

== See also ==
- Communes of the Somme department
