= Éplessier =

- Commune
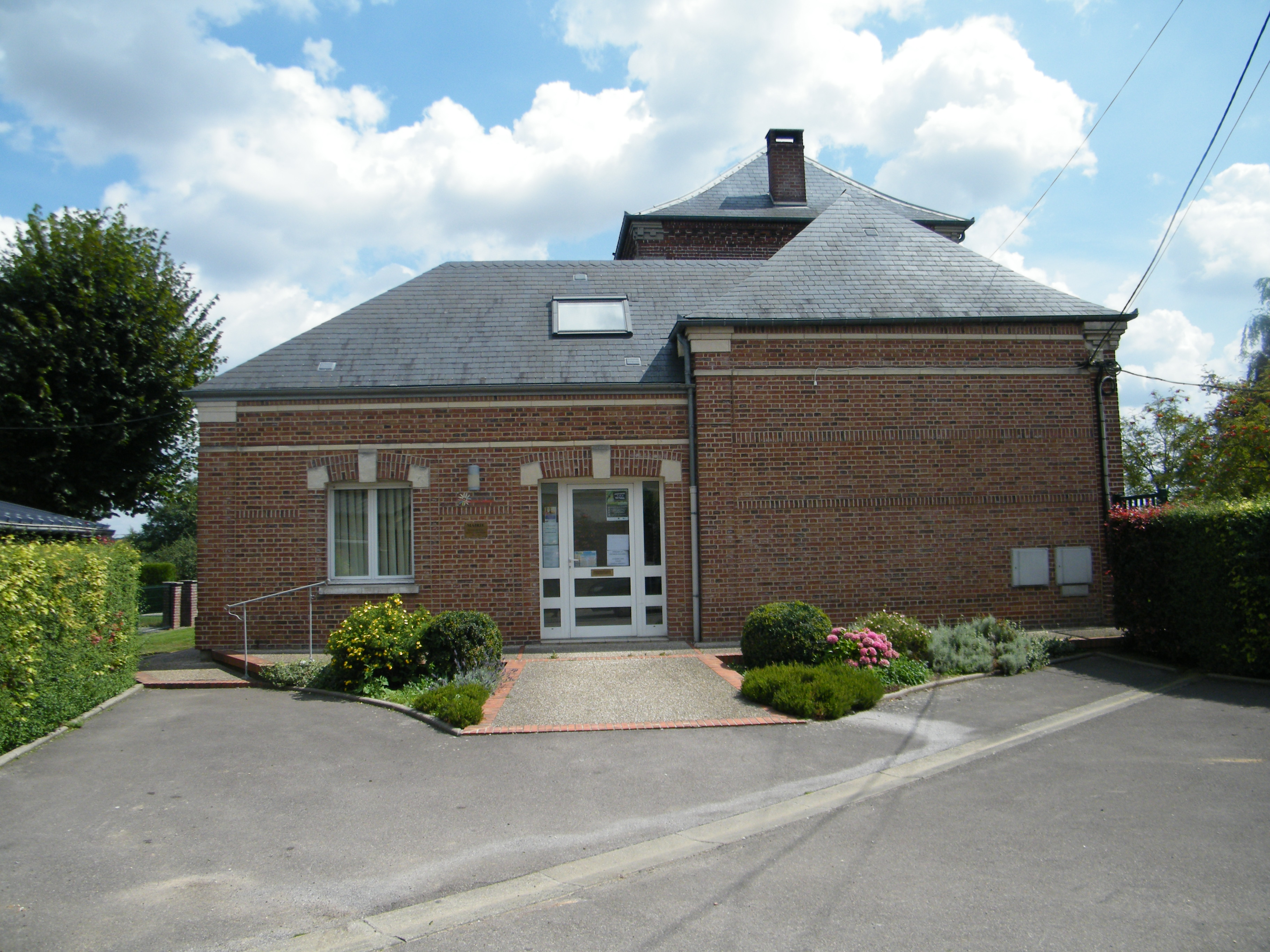
- Town hall
- Location of Éplessier
- Location within France Location within Hauts-de-France
- Coordinates: 49°47′48″N 1°57′28″E
- Country: France
- Region: Hauts-de-France
- Department: Somme
- Arrondissement: Amiens
- Canton: Poix-de-Picardie
- Intercommunality: CC Somme Sud-Ouest

Government
  - Mayor (2020–2026): Patricia Rimbault
- Area^{1}: 14.09 km^{2} (5.44 sq mi)
- Elevation: 150 m (490 ft)
- Highest elevation: 186 m (610 ft)
- Lowest elevation: 110 m (360 ft)
- Population (2023): 342
  - Density: 24.3/km^{2} (62.9/sq mi)
- Time zone: UTC+01:00 (CET)
  - Summer (DST): UTC+02:00 (CEST)
- INSEE/Postal code: 80273 /80290
- ^{1} French Land Register data, which excludes lakes, ponds, glaciers > 1 km^{2} (0.386 sq mi or 247 acres) and river estuaries.

Éplessier (French pronunciation: [eplɛsje]) is a commune in the Somme department in Hauts-de-France in northern France.

== Geography ==
Éplessier is situated on the D189 road, some 29 km (18 mi) west-southwest of Amiens.

== Population ==
Historical population
Year	Pop.	±% p.a.
1968	288	—
1975	259	−1.50%
1982	250	−0.50%
1990	312	+2.81%
1999	339	+0.93%
2007	372	+1.17%
2012	381	+0.48%
2017	361	−1.07%
2023	342	−0.90%
Source: INSEE

== See also ==
- Communes of the Somme department
