= Gauville, Somme =

Gauville
- Commune
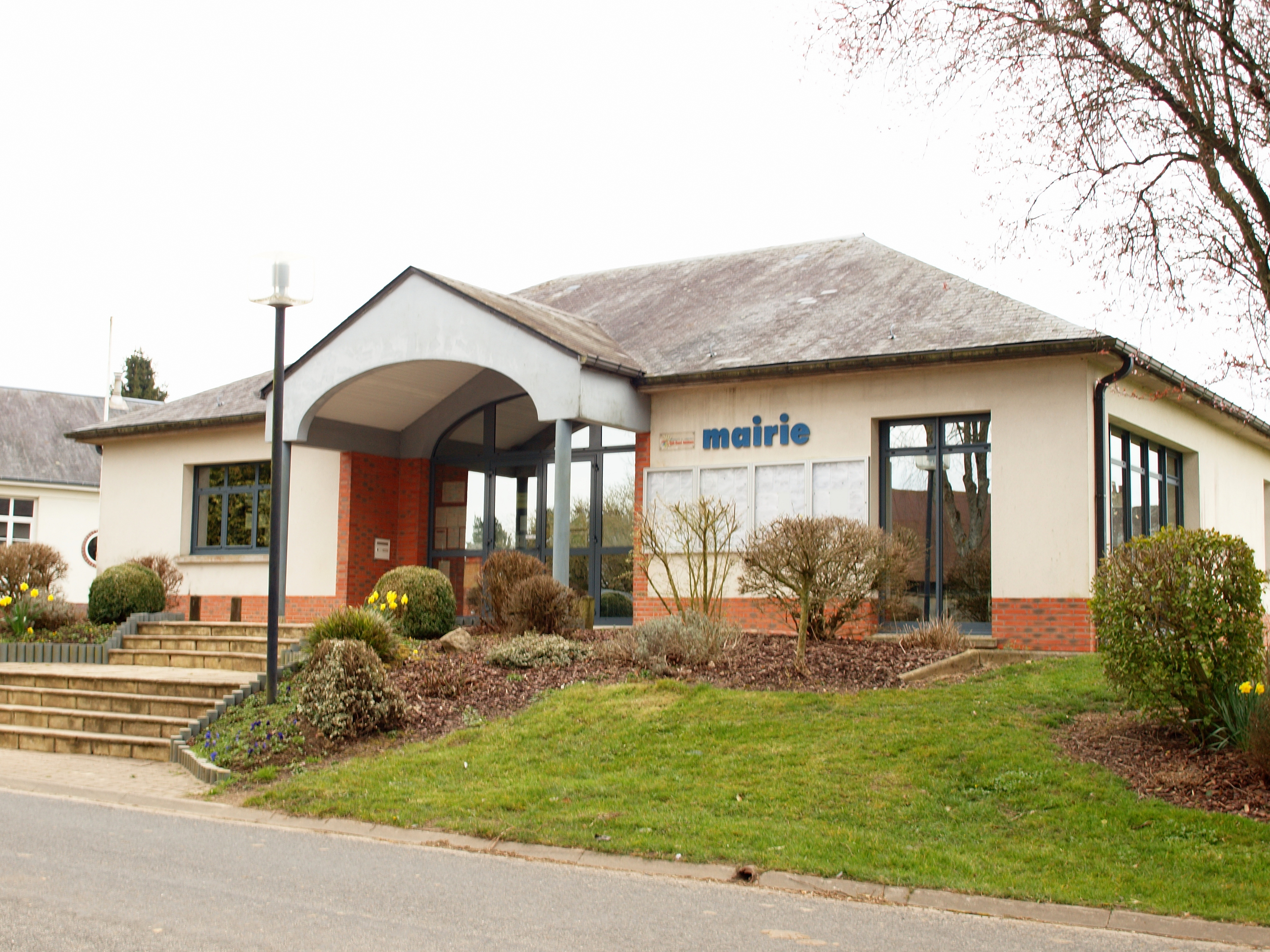
- The town hall in Gauville
- Location of Gauville
- Location within France Location within Hauts-de-France
- Coordinates: 49°46′56″N 1°47′30″E
- Country: France
- Region: Hauts-de-France
- Department: Somme
- Arrondissement: Amiens
- Canton: Poix-de-Picardie
- Intercommunality: CC Somme Sud-Ouest

Government
  - Mayor (2020–2026): Patricia Premmereur
- Area^{1}: 7.32 km^{2} (2.83 sq mi)
- Elevation: 212 m (696 ft)
- Highest elevation: 213 m (699 ft)
- Lowest elevation: 115 m (377 ft)
- Population (2023): 327
  - Density: 44.7/km^{2} (116/sq mi)
- Time zone: UTC+01:00 (CET)
  - Summer (DST): UTC+02:00 (CEST)
- INSEE/Postal code: 80375 /80290
- ^{1} French Land Register data, which excludes lakes, ponds, glaciers > 1 km^{2} (0.386 sq mi or 247 acres) and river estuaries.

Gauville (French pronunciation: [ɡovil]; Picard: Gueuville) is a commune in the Somme department in Hauts-de-France in northern France.

== Geography ==
Gauville is situated in the southwest, on the border with the département of Seine-Maritime, on the D1015 road, some 30 miles (48 km) southwest of Amiens.

== Population ==
Historical population
Year	Pop.	±% p.a.
1968	284	—
1975	290	+0.30%
1982	301	+0.53%
1990	310	+0.37%
1999	397	+2.79%
2007	402	+0.16%
2012	373	−1.49%
2017	346	−1.49%
2023	327	−0.94%
Source: INSEE

== See also ==
- Communes of the Somme department
