= Beaucamps-le-Jeune =

- Commune
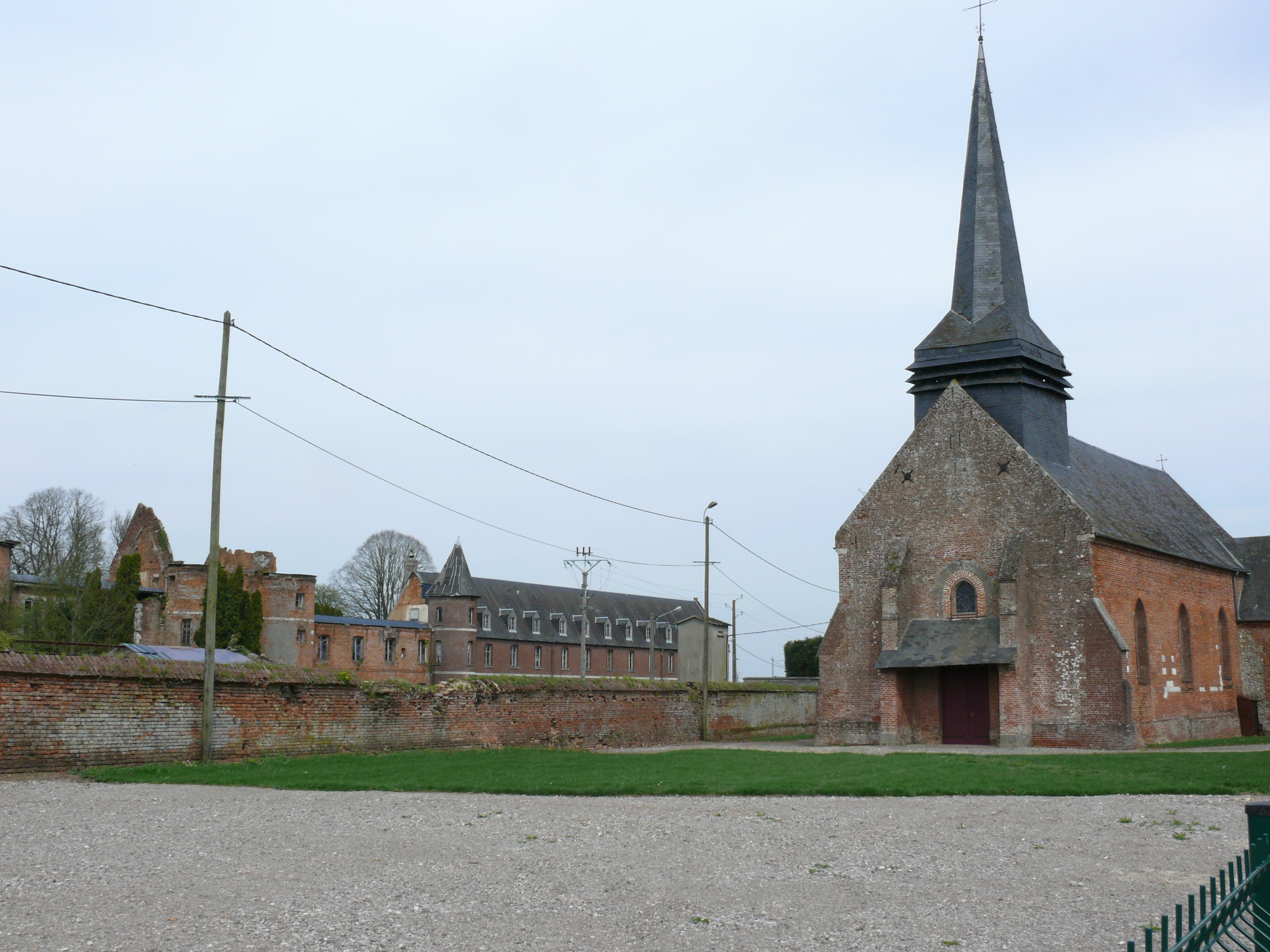
- The church and chateau of Beaucamps-le-Jeune
- Location of Beaucamps-le-Jeune
- Location within France Location within Hauts-de-France
- Coordinates: 49°49′01″N 1°46′22″E
- Country: France
- Region: Hauts-de-France
- Department: Somme
- Arrondissement: Amiens
- Canton: Poix-de-Picardie
- Intercommunality: CC Somme Sud-Ouest

Government
  - Mayor (2020–2026): Stéphane Duchaussoy
- Area^{1}: 6.72 km^{2} (2.59 sq mi)
- Elevation: 220 m (720 ft)
- Highest elevation: 211 m (692 ft)
- Lowest elevation: 155 m (509 ft)
- Population (2023): 207
  - Density: 30.8/km^{2} (79.8/sq mi)
- Time zone: UTC+01:00 (CET)
  - Summer (DST): UTC+02:00 (CEST)
- INSEE/Postal code: 80061 /80430
- ^{1} French Land Register data, which excludes lakes, ponds, glaciers > 1 km^{2} (0.386 sq mi or 247 acres) and river estuaries.

Beaucamps-le-Jeune (French pronunciation: [bokɑ̃ lə ʒœn]; Picard: Bieucamp-Jonne) is a commune in the Somme department in Hauts-de-France in northern France.

== Geography ==
The commune is situated on the D496 road, near the banks of the Bresle, the border of the departments of the Somme and Seine-Maritime.

== Population ==
Historical population
Year	Pop.	±% p.a.
1968	214	—
1975	203	−0.75%
1982	177	−1.94%
1990	193	+1.09%
1999	187	−0.35%
2007	188	+0.07%
2012	208	+2.04%
2017	202	−0.58%
2023	207	+0.41%
Source: INSEE

== See also ==
- Communes of the Somme department
