= Sainte-Segrée =

- Commune
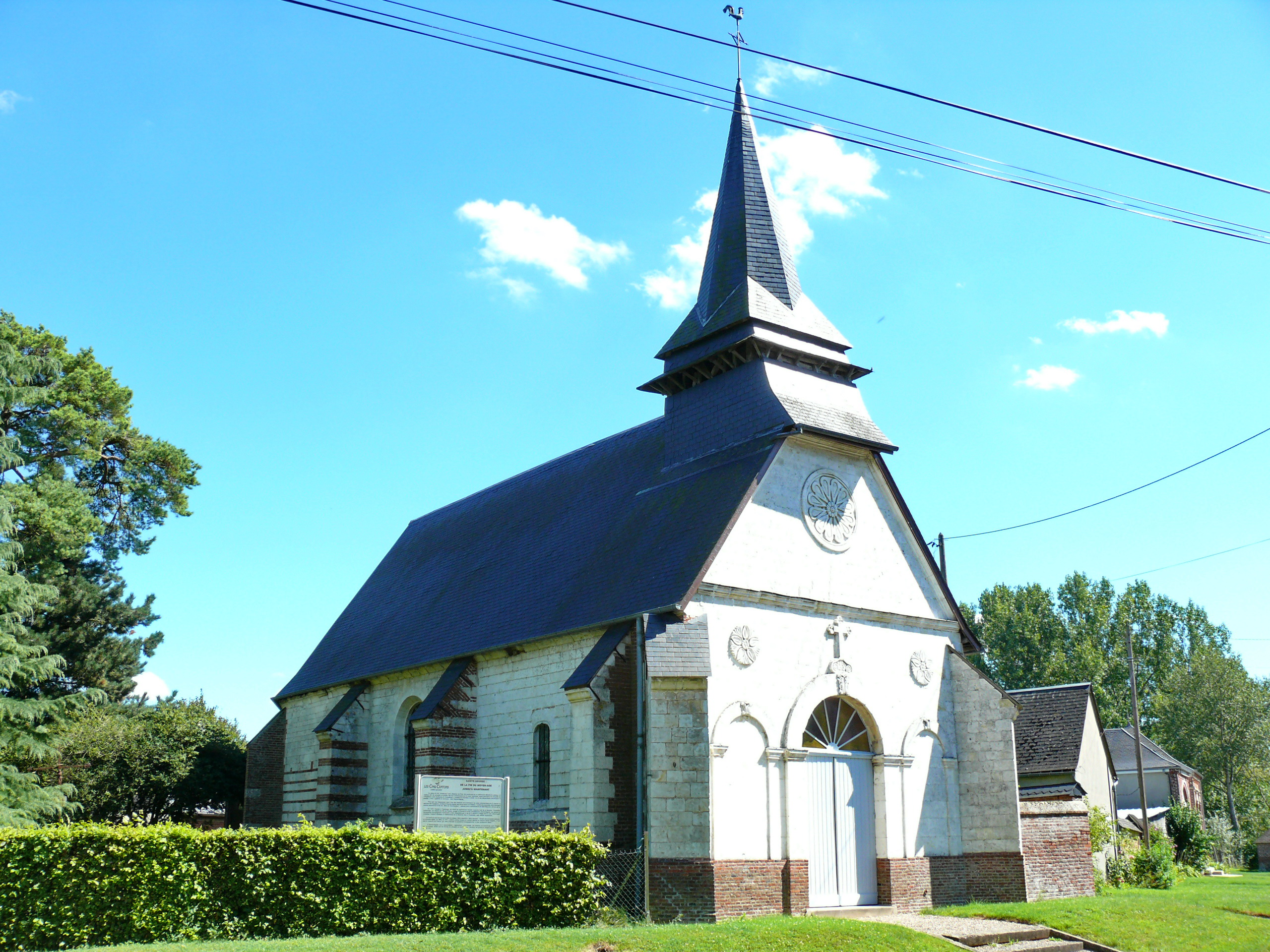
- The church in Sainte-Segrée
- Location of Sainte-Segrée
- Location within France Location within Hauts-de-France
- Coordinates: 49°45′22″N 1°54′48″E
- Country: France
- Region: Hauts-de-France
- Department: Somme
- Arrondissement: Amiens
- Canton: Poix-de-Picardie
- Intercommunality: CC Somme Sud-Ouest

Government
  - Mayor (2020–2026): Olivier Desmarest
- Area^{1}: 2.27 km^{2} (0.88 sq mi)
- Elevation: 185 m (607 ft)
- Highest elevation: 189 m (620 ft)
- Lowest elevation: 132 m (433 ft)
- Population (2023): 47
  - Density: 21/km^{2} (54/sq mi)
- Time zone: UTC+01:00 (CET)
  - Summer (DST): UTC+02:00 (CEST)
- INSEE/Postal code: 80719 /80290
- ^{1} French Land Register data, which excludes lakes, ponds, glaciers > 1 km^{2} (0.386 sq mi or 247 acres) and river estuaries.

Sainte-Segrée is a commune in the Somme department in Hauts-de-France in northern France.

== Geography ==
The commune is situated some 19 miles (31 km) southwest of Amiens, on the D98 road

== Population ==
Historical population
Year	Pop.	±% p.a.
1968	92	—
1975	88	−0.63%
1982	76	−2.07%
1990	50	−5.10%
1999	56	+1.27%
2007	56	+0.00%
2012	60	+1.39%
2017	57	−1.02%
2023	47	−3.16%
Source: INSEE

== See also ==
- Communes of the Somme department
