= Bettembos =

- Commune
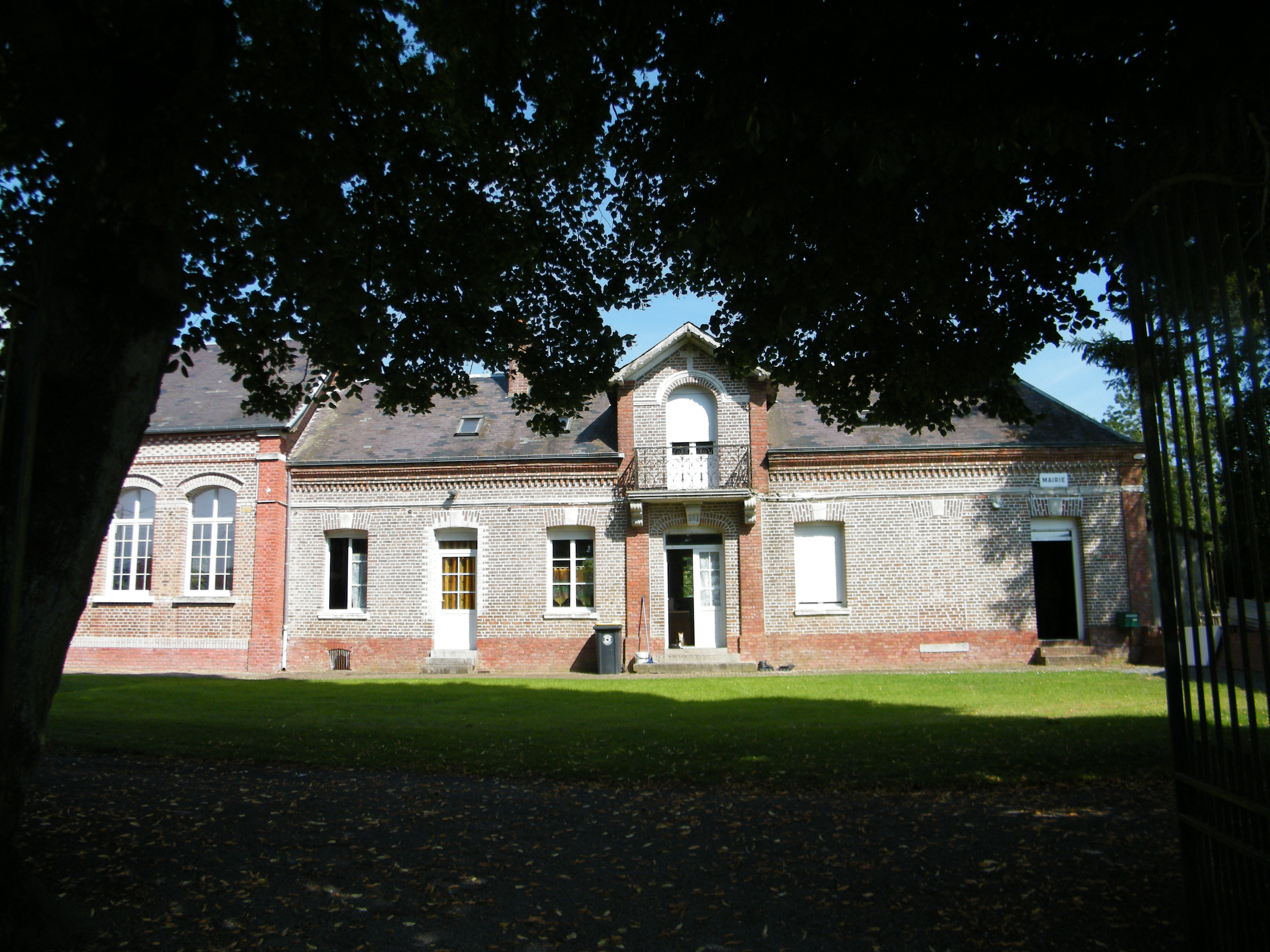
- The town hall and school in Bettembos
- Location of Bettembos
- Location within France Location within Hauts-de-France
- Coordinates: 49°48′18″N 1°52′50″E
- Country: France
- Region: Hauts-de-France
- Department: Somme
- Arrondissement: Amiens
- Canton: Poix-de-Picardie
- Intercommunality: CC Somme Sud-Ouest

Government
  - Mayor (2020–2026): Francis Guilbert
- Area^{1}: 4.16 km^{2} (1.61 sq mi)
- Elevation: 190 m (620 ft)
- Highest elevation: 192 m (630 ft)
- Lowest elevation: 169 m (554 ft)
- Population (2023): 91
  - Density: 22/km^{2} (57/sq mi)
- Time zone: UTC+01:00 (CET)
  - Summer (DST): UTC+02:00 (CEST)
- INSEE/Postal code: 80098 /80290
- ^{1} French Land Register data, which excludes lakes, ponds, glaciers > 1 km^{2} (0.386 sq mi or 247 acres) and river estuaries.

Bettembos (Picard: Bétimbo) is a commune in the Somme department in Hauts-de-France in northern France.

== Etymology of the commune's name ==
Betembos (1154), Betemboiz (1177), Betthembos (1206), Bedembos (1337), Bethembos (1349), Bettembos (1483), Betembo (1648), Betenbos (1710), Betenbo (1733), Bettenbos (1750), Betanbo (1778).

== Geography ==
Bettembos is situated on the D36 road, within a mile of the A29 autoroute, 40 kilometres (25 mi) southwest of Amiens.

== Population ==
Historical population
Year	Pop.	±% p.a.
1968	97	—
1975	86	−1.70%
1982	89	+0.49%
1990	88	−0.14%
1999	98	+1.20%
2007	98	+0.00%
2012	94	−0.83%
2017	102	+1.65%
2023	91	−1.88%
Source: INSEE

== See also ==
- Communes of the Somme department
