= Bergicourt =

- Commune
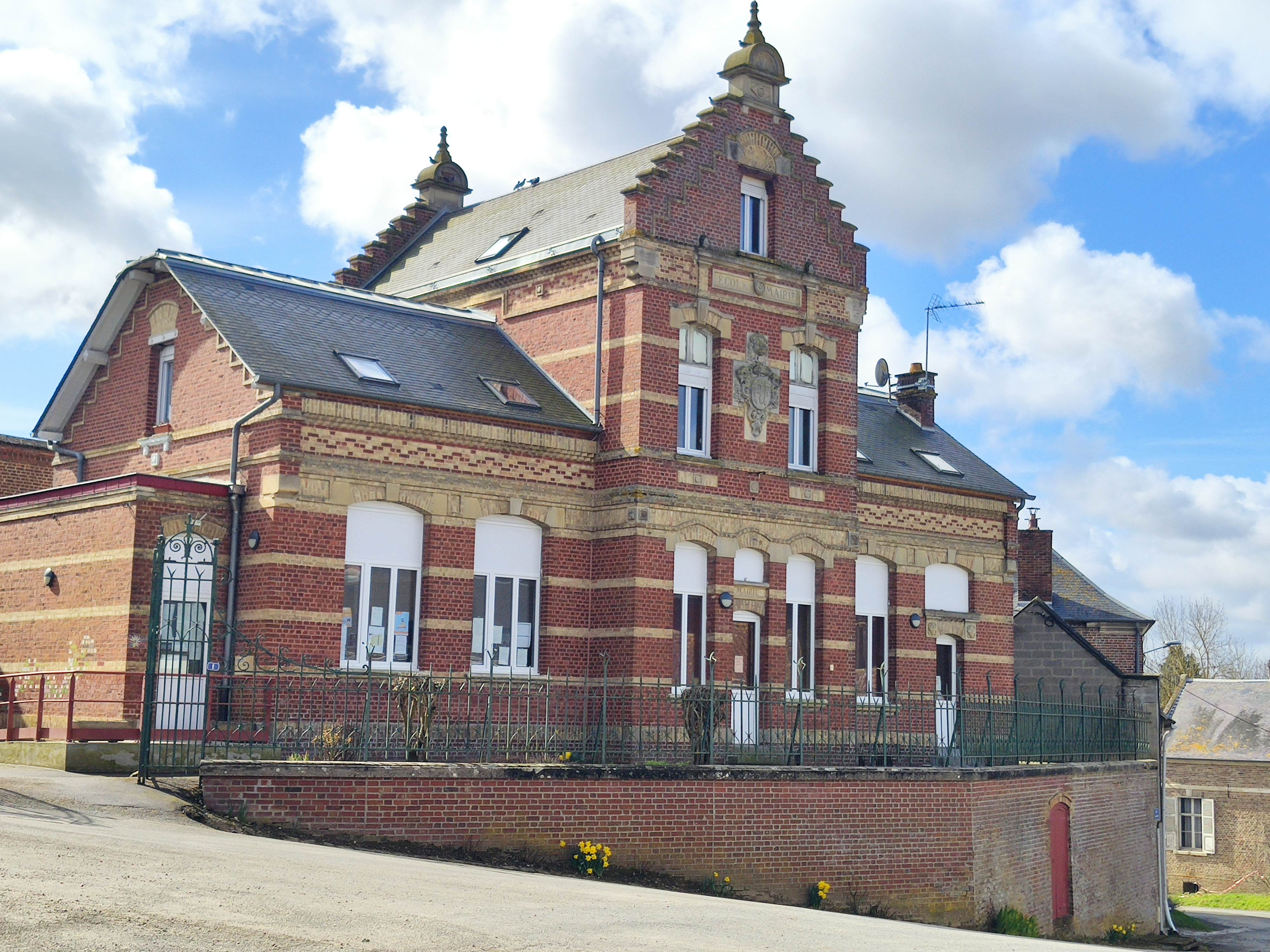
- The town hall and school in Bergicourt
- Location of Bergicourt
- Location within France Location within Hauts-de-France
- Coordinates: 49°44′52″N 2°01′29″E
- Country: France
- Region: Hauts-de-France
- Department: Somme
- Arrondissement: Amiens
- Canton: Poix-de-Picardie
- Intercommunality: CC Somme Sud-Ouest

Government
  - Mayor (2022–2026): Sebastien Chabaille
- Area^{1}: 6.85 km^{2} (2.64 sq mi)
- Elevation: 93 m (305 ft)
- Highest elevation: 185 m (607 ft)
- Lowest elevation: 78 m (256 ft)
- Population (2023): 145
  - Density: 21.2/km^{2} (54.8/sq mi)
- Time zone: UTC+01:00 (CET)
  - Summer (DST): UTC+02:00 (CEST)
- INSEE/Postal code: 80083 /80290
- ^{1} French Land Register data, which excludes lakes, ponds, glaciers > 1 km^{2} (0.386 sq mi or 247 acres) and river estuaries.

Bergicourt (French pronunciation: [bɛʁʒikuʁ]; Picard: Bérgicourt) is a commune in the Somme department in Hauts-de-France in northern France.

== Geography ==
Bergicourt is situated on the D94 road, some 20 miles (32 km) southwest of Amiens.

== Population ==
Historical population
Year	Pop.	±% p.a.
1968	125	—
1975	112	−1.56%
1982	135	+2.70%
1990	135	+0.00%
1999	131	−0.33%
2007	153	+1.96%
2012	160	+0.90%
2017	145	−1.95%
2023	145	+0.00%
Source: INSEE

== See also ==
- Communes of the Somme department
