= Bussy-lès-Poix =

- Commune
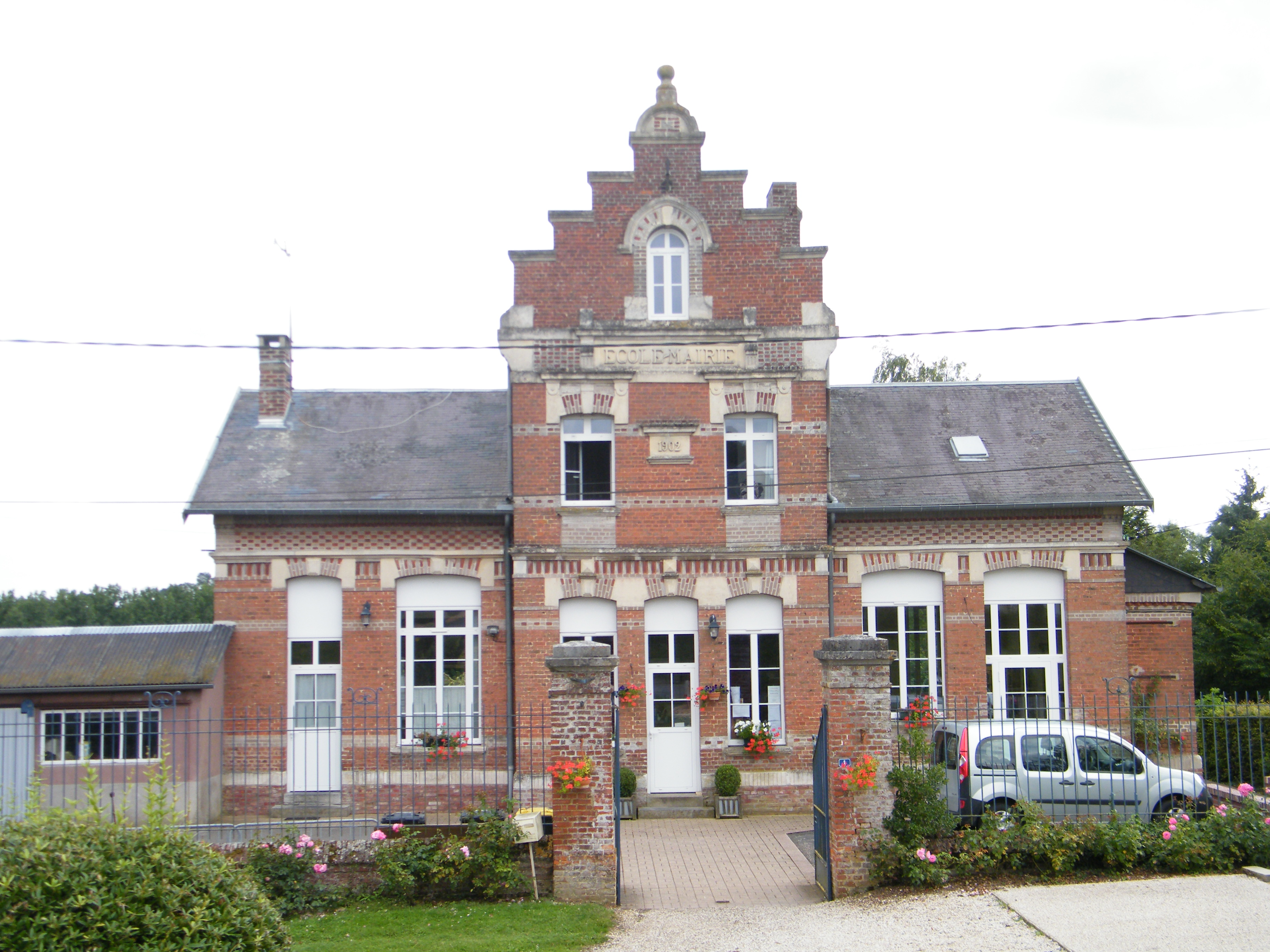
- The town hall and school in Bussy-lès-Poix

- Coat of arms
- Location of Bussy-lès-Poix
- Location within France Location within Hauts-de-France
- Coordinates: 49°49′17″N 2°01′07″E
- Country: France
- Region: Hauts-de-France
- Department: Somme
- Arrondissement: Amiens
- Canton: Poix-de-Picardie
- Intercommunality: CC Somme Sud-Ouest

Government
  - Mayor (2020–2026): Pascal Aubree
- Area^{1}: 4.4 km^{2} (1.7 sq mi)
- Elevation: 175 m (574 ft)
- Highest elevation: 178 m (584 ft)
- Lowest elevation: 99 m (325 ft)
- Population (2023): 90
  - Density: 20/km^{2} (53/sq mi)
- Time zone: UTC+01:00 (CET)
  - Summer (DST): UTC+02:00 (CEST)
- INSEE/Postal code: 80157 /80290
- ^{1} French Land Register data, which excludes lakes, ponds, glaciers > 1 km^{2} (0.386 sq mi or 247 acres) and river estuaries.

Bussy-lès-Poix (French pronunciation: [bysi lɛ pwa], literally Bussy near Poix; Picard: Buchy-lès-Poé) is a commune in the Somme department in Hauts-de-France in northern France.

== Geography ==
The commune is situated on the D141 road, some 15 miles (24 km) southwest of Amiens.

== Population ==
Historical population
Year	Pop.	±% p.a.
1968	101	—
1975	96	−0.72%
1982	88	−1.24%
1990	88	+0.00%
1999	89	+0.13%
2007	90	+0.14%
2012	93	+0.66%
2017	101	+1.66%
2023	90	−1.90%
Source: INSEE

== See also ==
- Communes of the Somme department
