= Équennes-Éramecourt =

- Commune
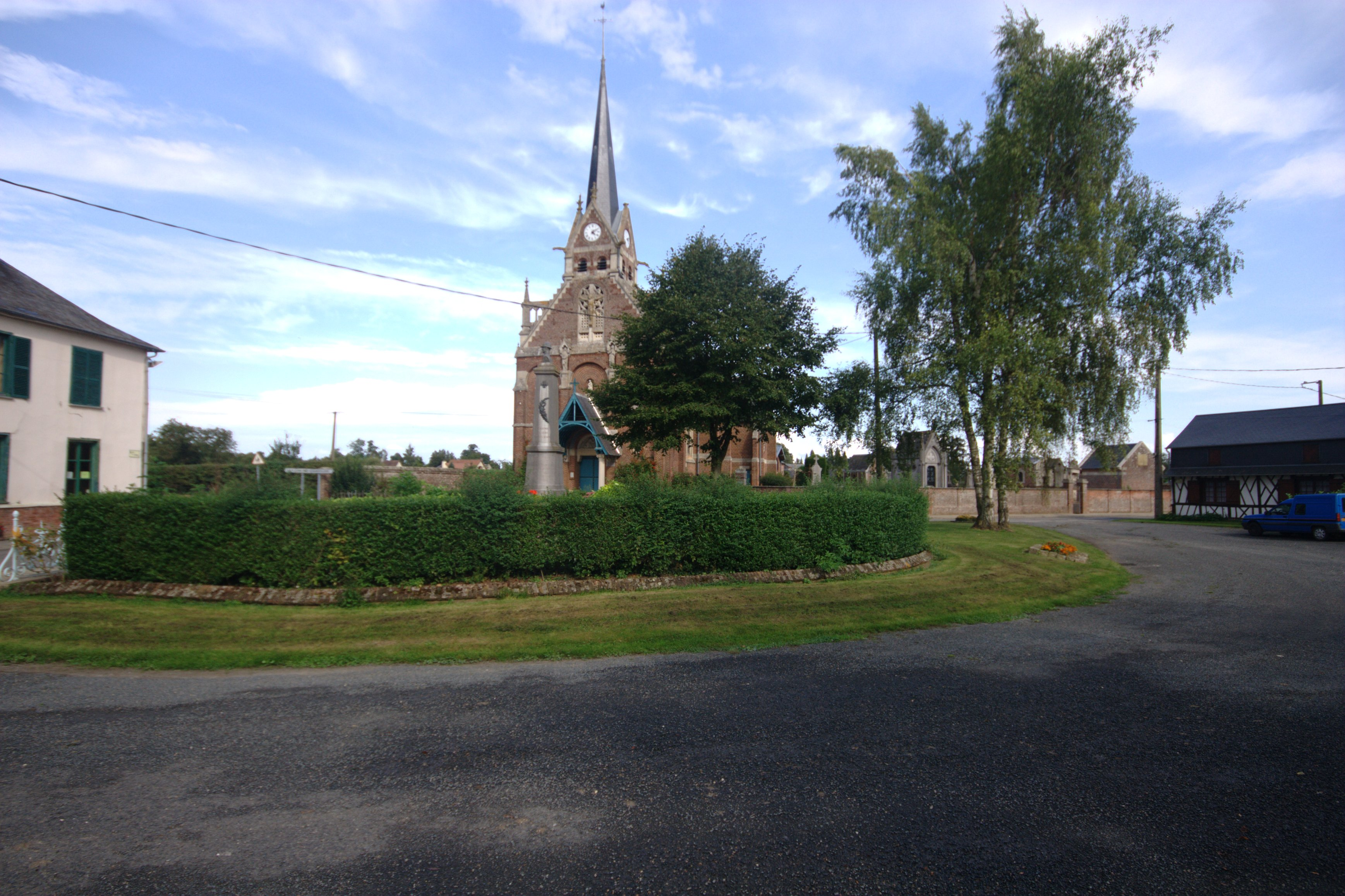
- Around St. Mary-Magdalena's Church in Équennes

- Coat of arms
- Location of Équennes-Éramecourt
- Location within France Location within Hauts-de-France
- Coordinates: 49°44′03″N 1°57′39″E
- Country: France
- Region: Hauts-de-France
- Department: Somme
- Arrondissement: Amiens
- Canton: Poix-de-Picardie
- Intercommunality: CC Somme Sud-Ouest

Government
  - Mayor (2020–2026): Sabine Chelle-Poiret
- Area^{1}: 9.08 km^{2} (3.51 sq mi)
- Elevation: 187 m (614 ft)
- Highest elevation: 187 m (614 ft)
- Lowest elevation: 107 m (351 ft)
- Population (2023): 276
  - Density: 30.4/km^{2} (78.7/sq mi)
- Time zone: UTC+01:00 (CET)
  - Summer (DST): UTC+02:00 (CEST)
- INSEE/Postal code: 80276 /80290
- ^{1} French Land Register data, which excludes lakes, ponds, glaciers > 1 km^{2} (0.386 sq mi or 247 acres) and river estuaries.

Équennes-Éramecourt (French pronunciation: [ekɛn eʁamkuʁ]; Picard: Étcheinne-Érinmecourt) is a commune in the Somme department in Hauts-de-France in northern France.

== Geography ==
Formed from the administrative merger of the two villages of Équennes and Éramecourt in 1973, the commune is situated on the D901 road, some 32 km (20 mi) southwest of Amiens.

== Population ==
Historical population
Year	Pop.	±% p.a.
1968	219	—
1975	235	+1.01%
1982	220	−0.94%
1990	199	−1.25%
1999	247	+2.43%
2007	323	+3.41%
2012	306	−1.08%
2017	296	−0.66%
2023	276	−1.16%
Source: INSEE

== See also ==
- Communes of the Somme department
