= Blangy-sous-Poix =

- Commune
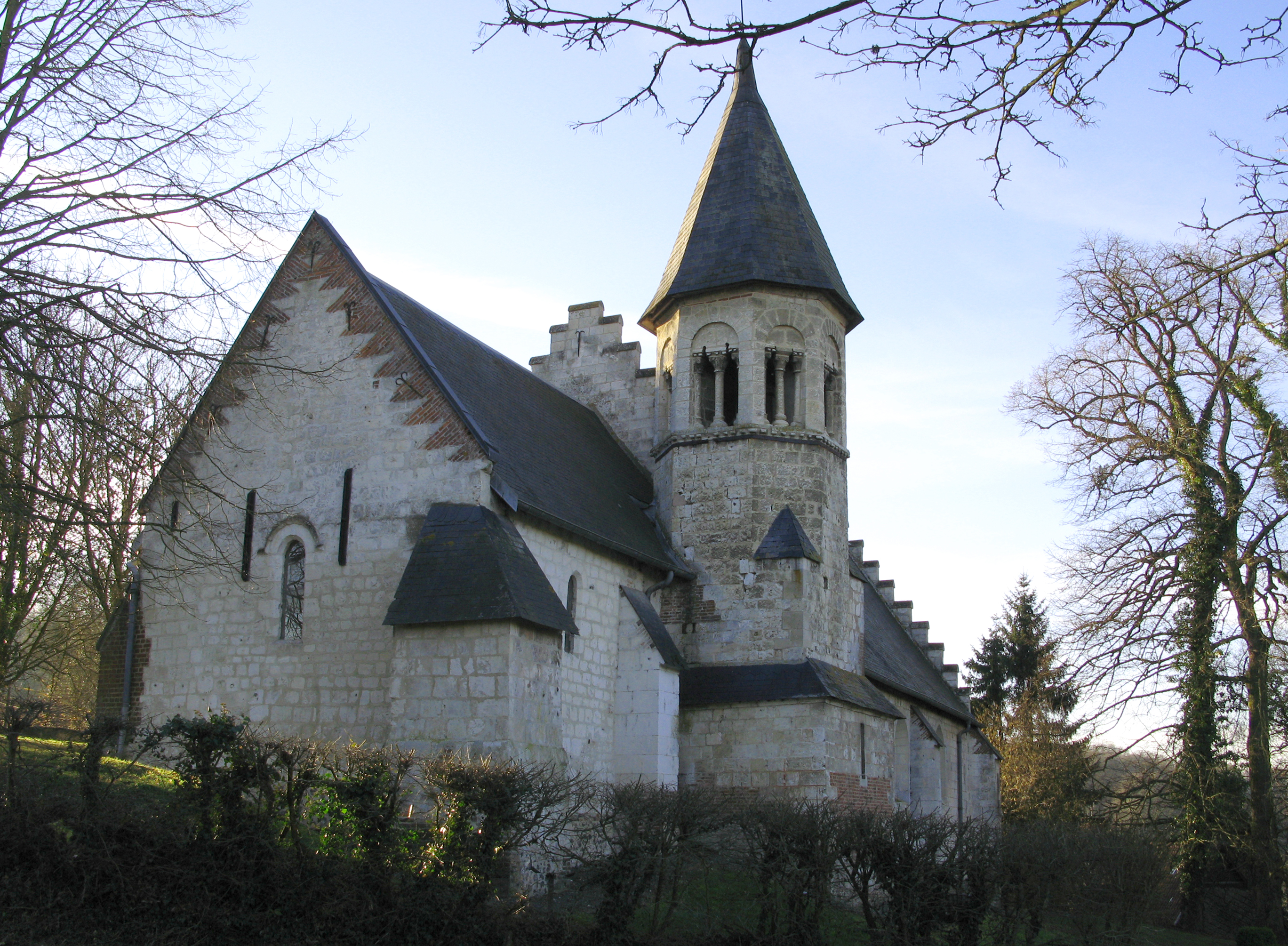
- The church in Blangy-sous-Poix
- Location of Blangy-sous-Poix
- Location within France Location within Hauts-de-France
- Coordinates: 49°46′02″N 2°00′11″E
- Country: France
- Region: Hauts-de-France
- Department: Somme
- Arrondissement: Amiens
- Canton: Poix-de-Picardie
- Intercommunality: CC Somme Sud-Ouest

Government
  - Mayor (2020–2026): Alain Lesur
- Area^{1}: 8.01 km^{2} (3.09 sq mi)
- Elevation: 99 m (325 ft)
- Highest elevation: 189 m (620 ft)
- Lowest elevation: 85 m (279 ft)
- Population (2023): 161
  - Density: 20.1/km^{2} (52.1/sq mi)
- Time zone: UTC+01:00 (CET)
  - Summer (DST): UTC+02:00 (CEST)
- INSEE/Postal code: 80106 /80290
- ^{1} French Land Register data, which excludes lakes, ponds, glaciers > 1 km^{2} (0.386 sq mi or 247 acres) and river estuaries.

Blangy-sous-Poix (French pronunciation: [blɑ̃ʒi su pwa], literally Blangy under Poix; Picard: Blangy-dsou-Poé) is a commune in the Somme department in Hauts-de-France in northern France.

== Geography ==
The commune is situated 23 miles (37 km) southwest of Amiens on the D262 road.

== Population ==
Historical population
Year	Pop.	±% p.a.
1968	159	—
1975	146	−1.21%
1982	160	+1.32%
1990	141	−1.57%
1999	158	+1.27%
2007	183	+1.85%
2012	188	+0.54%
2017	181	−0.76%
2023	161	−1.93%
Source: INSEE

== See also ==
- Communes of the Somme department
