= Meigneux, Somme =

Meigneux
- Commune
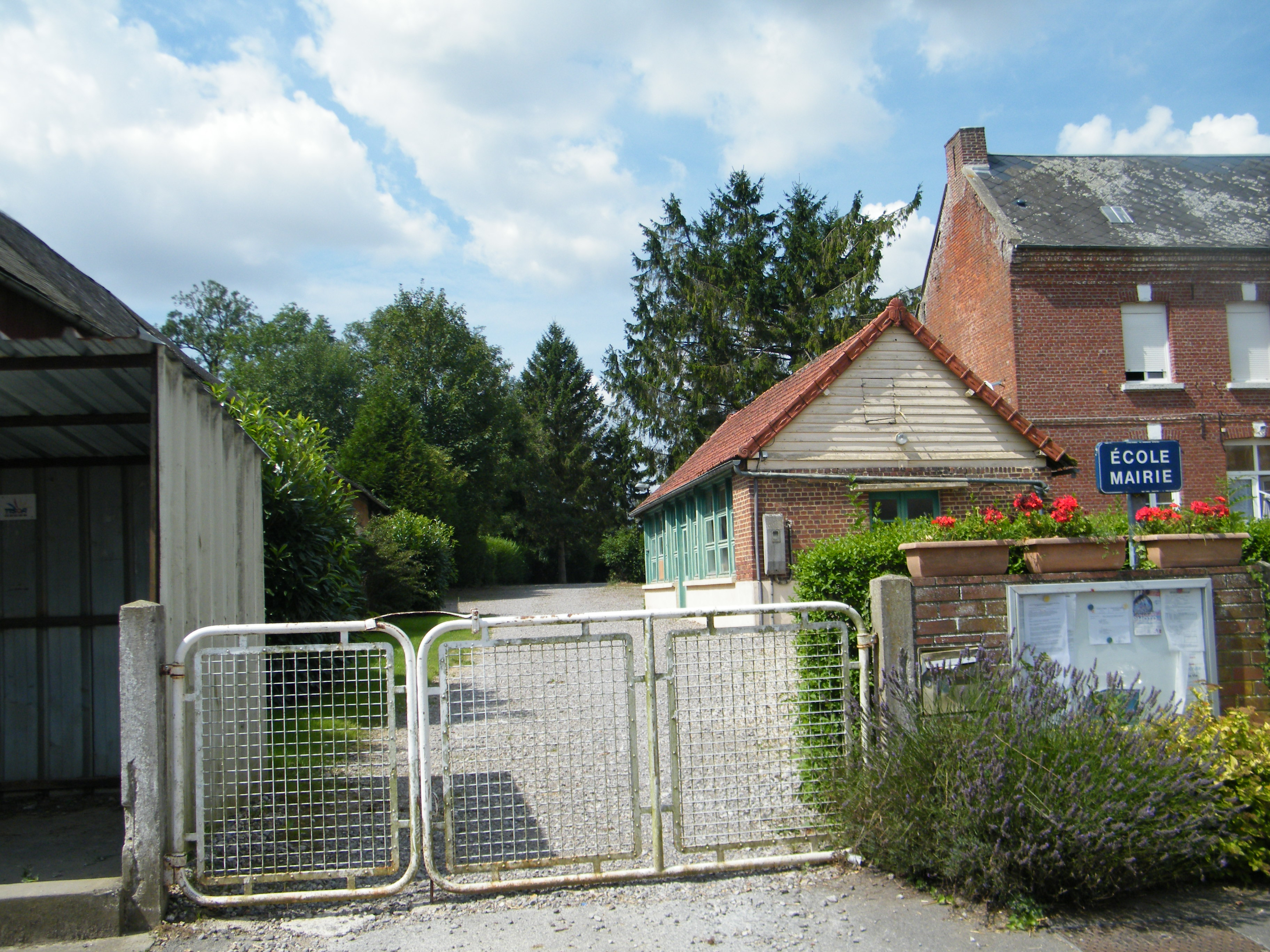
- The town hall and school in Meigneux
- Location of Meigneux
- Location within France Location within Hauts-de-France
- Coordinates: 49°45′55″N 1°53′45″E
- Country: France
- Region: Hauts-de-France
- Department: Somme
- Arrondissement: Amiens
- Canton: Poix-de-Picardie
- Intercommunality: CC Somme Sud-Ouest

Government
  - Mayor (2020–2026): Grégory Lefebvre
- Area^{1}: 3.97 km^{2} (1.53 sq mi)
- Elevation: 200 m (660 ft)
- Highest elevation: 199 m (653 ft)
- Lowest elevation: 173 m (568 ft)
- Population (2023): 183
  - Density: 46.1/km^{2} (119/sq mi)
- Time zone: UTC+01:00 (CET)
  - Summer (DST): UTC+02:00 (CEST)
- INSEE/Postal code: 80525 /80290
- ^{1} French Land Register data, which excludes lakes, ponds, glaciers > 1 km^{2} (0.386 sq mi or 247 acres) and river estuaries.

Meigneux (French pronunciation: [mɛɲø]; Picard: Mingnu) is a commune in the Somme department in Hauts-de-France in northern France.

== Geography ==
Meigneux is situated on the D98 road, some 20 miles (32 km) southwest of Amiens.

== Population ==
Historical population
Year	Pop.	±% p.a.
1968	238	—
1975	160	−5.51%
1982	156	−0.36%
1990	150	−0.49%
1999	151	+0.07%
2007	157	+0.49%
2012	165	+1.00%
2017	175	+1.18%
2023	183	+0.75%
Source: INSEE

== See also ==
- Communes of the Somme department
