= Canton of Boves =

Coordinates: 49°50′46″N 2°23′30″E

Boves
- Former canton
- Interactive map of Boves
- Country: France
- Region: Hauts-de-France
- Department: Somme
- No. of communes: {{{nbcomm}}}
- Disbanded: 2015
- Area: 184.06 km^{2} (71.07 sq mi)
- Population (2012): 20,790
  - Density: 113.0/km^{2} (292.5/sq mi)

The Canton of Boves is a former canton situated in the department of the Somme and in the former Picardy region of northern France. It was disbanded following the French canton reorganisation which came into effect in March 2015. It had 20,790 inhabitants (2012).

== Geography ==
The canton is organised around the commune of Boves in the arrondissement of Amiens. The altitude varies from 21m at Glisy to 137m at Saint-Sauflieu for an average of 73m.

The canton comprised 23 communes:

- Blangy-Tronville
- Boves
- Cachy
- Cottenchy
- Dommartin
- Dury
- Estrées-sur-Noye
- Fouencamps
- Gentelles
- Glisy
- Grattepanche
- Guyencourt-sur-Noye
- Hailles
- Hébécourt
- Remiencourt
- Rumigny
- Sains-en-Amiénois
- Saint-Fuscien
- Saint-Sauflieu
- Saleux
- Salouël
- Thézy-Glimont
- Vers-sur-Selles

== Population ==
1962	1968	1975	1982	1990	1999
11018	12703	15271	17988	19370	19598
Census count starting from 1962 : Population without double counting

== See also ==
- Arrondissements of the Somme department
- Cantons of the Somme department
- Communes of the Somme department
