= 16th Infantry Division (France) =

French military unit

- Active: 1873-1940
- Country: France
- Branch: (France) French Army
- Type: Division
- Engagements: World War I: Battle of Lorraine; Battle of Flirey; Battle of Verdun; Battle of the Hills; Second Battle of the Marne; Meuse–Argonne offensive; World War II: Battle of France

The 16th Infantry Division (16^{e} Division d'Infanterie, 16^{e} DI) was a division of the French Army that participated in a number of major battles during the First World War. During the Second World War it participated in the Battle of France, inflicting substantial losses on German units along the Somme in June 1940 before being encircled and destroyed.

== Formation ==
The 16th Infantry Division was established by the Decree of 28 September 1873 which reorganized the French Army. It was assigned to the 8th Military Region (8^{e} Région Militaire) and garrisoned in Bourges. It consisted of two brigades, each with two infantry regiments:

- 31st Infantry Brigade (31^{e} Brigade d'Infanterie)
  - 95th Line Infantry Regiment (95^{e} Régiment d'Infanterie de Ligne)
  - 134th Line Infantry Regiment (134^{e} Régiment d'Infanterie de Ligne)
- 32nd Infantry Brigade (32^{e} Brigade d'Infanterie)
  - 13th Line Infantry Regiment (13^{e} Régiment d'Infanterie de Ligne)
  - 29th Line Infantry Regiment (29^{e} Régiment d'Infanterie de Ligne)

== World War I ==
In August 1914 the 16^{e} Division d'Infanterie was mobilized as part of the 8th Army Corps, under the command of General Louis Ernest de Maud'huy. It was organized as follows:

- 31st Infantry Brigade
  - 85th Infantry Regiment (85^{e} Régiment d'Infanterie, 85^{e} RI)
  - 95th Infantry Regiment (95^{e} Régiment d'Infanterie, 95^{e} RI)
- 32nd Infantry Brigade
  - 13th Infantry Regiment (13^{e} Régiment d'Infanterie, 13^{e} RI)
  - 29th Infantry Regiment (29^{e} Régiment d'Infanterie, 29^{e} RI)
- 1st Field Artillery Regiment (1^{er}Régiment d'Artillerie de Campagne, 1^{er} RAC)
  - Composed of three groups of 75 mm field guns.
- 1st Squadron, 16th Mounted Chasseurs Regiment (16^{e} Régiment de Chasseurs à Cheval, 16^{e} RCC)
- Engineer Company 8/2 from the 4th Engineer Regiment (4^{e} Régiment du Génie, 4^{e} RG)

=== Operational history ===
In August the division was transported to the Vosges region near the Franco-German border, before moving to the Meurthe region. On 14 August the division went on the offensive, advancing through the town of Blamont and fighting at Domèvre-sur-Vezouze before occupying Sarrebourg on 18 August. From 18 to 20 August the division fought in the Battle of Sarrebourg in the vicinity of Réding and Hoff. From 21 August the unit was withdrawn west of the Mortagne to the area of Haillainville, and was involved in the Battle of the Mortagne from 25 August to 13 September, engaging in combat around Mattexey and Deinvillers. On 8 September 1914 Gen. Jean Frédéric Lucien Piarron de Mondésir took command of the division. The unit was then withdrawn from the front and transported by rail to Saint-Mihiel, arriving on 17 September. The unit then moved into the Woëvre region, fighting near Woël and Doncourt-aux-Templiers until 20 September.

After being briefly withdrawn from the front, the 16^{e} Division was again engaged in the Battle of Flirey from 25 September 1914 until 4 April 1915, fighting around Apremont and the bois d'Ailly. The division remained engaged along this section of the front until late January 1916, participating in numerous local actions. On 12 October 1914 General Vandenberg took command of the 16^{e} DI, succeeded in turn by Gen. Jean-Joseph Rouquerol on 7 January 1915. In July 1915 Engineer Company 8/2bis of the 4^{e} RG was attached to the division, and in November the cavalry squadron from the 16^{e} RCC was detached and joined the 73e DI. By January 1916 Engineer Company 8/2bis had been redesignated Company 8/52 and the division medical component was reinforced by an ambulance and hospital unit. On 22 January the 16^{e} DI was withdrawn from the front for rest near Commercy, and beginning on 4 February received training and instruction at the Camp de Belrain. Returning to the front, the division was deployed in the Meuse department, occupying a sector between les Paroches and Woimbey from 21 February until 18 March. From 18 March until 3 July the unit held the frontline between les Éparges and Bonzée-en-Woëvre before being withdrawn for rest and instruction near Rosnes.

On 11 July 1916 the 16th Division returned to the front to participate in the Battle of Verdun, fighting near Damloup, before being transferred back to its previously held sector between les Éparges et Bonzée-en-Woëvre in August. In July 1916 the 123rd battery of 58 mm trench mortars from the 37th Field Artillery Regiment (37^{e}Régiment d'Artillerie de Campagne, 37^{e} RAC) was attached to the division, and on 9 Aug 1916 General Le Gallais took command of the unit. On 17 September the division was withdrawn from rest near Ligny-en-Barrois before receiving training at the Camp de Saffais from 20 September until 29 November. The unit then traveled by rail to the area of Crèvecœur-le-Grand, before occupying a sector of the front between Berny-en-Santerre and Belloy-en-Santerre on 9 December, relieving the 3^{e} and 4^{e} DI. From 23 to 28 December the 16^{e} DI covered the sector from Fresnes to Berny. On 28 December the division was relieved and moved first to Aumale and then to Poix for rest.

In January 1917 the 2nd Squadron of the 16^{e} RCC was attached to the division, as well as the 173rd battery of the 37^{e} RAC, armed with 75 mm and 150 mm trench mortars. On 19 January the division moved by rail to Sainte-Menehould, and on 24 January occupied a sector of the front between Vienne-le-Château and the Aisne. On 31 March the 16^{e} DI moved by truck to the Champagne region and occupied the front between Marquises farm and the Verzy-Nauroy road. From 16 April the division fought in the Battle of the Hills of Champagne.

On 17 April the division launched an assault on the German positions in the Bois de la Grille; the preliminary bombardment failed to destroy the German machine gun positions and losses were heavy. Only the 95^{e} RI on the division's left flank succeeded in breaking through the German lines and reaching the Leopoldshöhe trench, but was driven back after a German counterattack and forced to fall back to the German first line. The 27^{e} RI in the center and 85^{e} RI on the right were stopped short of the Leopoldshöhe position; the 27^{e} RI succeeded in penetrating as far as the Wahn trench but was forced to fall back to the Skoda position following a strong German counterattack at 1030. The 85^{e} RI, in conjunction with the 13^{e} RI, succeeded in capturing and holding the high ground of Mont Cornillet. Over the next several days the division dug-in and held the newly captured positions; on 19 May the 95^{e} RI drove off a German attack with a bayonet charge. The 85^{e} RI repulsed German attacks on Mont Cornillet for three days while isolated from resupply due to heavy artillery fire.

On 25 April the unit was pulled off the front line for rest near Condé-en-Barrois and Vaubécourt. On 3 May the division shifted back to the Verdun area and occupied the front between Damloup and Haudiomont until 19 June, when it was once more pulled off the line and transported by rail to Dommartin-sur-Yèvre via Sainte-Menehoulde for rest. On the night of 25 June a mutiny took place in the camp of the 85^{e} RI, where several dozen soldiers refused to go to the front; the ringleader Fernand Denison was sentenced to death by a military tribunal.

The division underwent a significant reorganization in July 1917 with the abolition of the infantry brigades, following the detachment of the 32^{e} brigade to form the 169^{e} DI. With the addition of the 27th Infantry Regiment, taken from the 15e DI, the divisional infantry consisted of the 27^{e} RI, 85^{e} RI and 95^{e} RI after this reorganization. Engineer company 8/71 from the 4^{e} RG was also attached to the division.

On 6 July the division returned to the front in Champagne, occupying a sector between Maisons de Champagne and the Aisne. On 6 December the 16^{e} DI was relieved and moved to Dampierre-le-Château and then Sainte-Menehould for rest and instruction. In December 1917 the 11th group of 155 mm cannons from the 108^{e} RAC was attached to the division, and in January 1918 the 101st battery (58 mm mortars) of the 1^{er} RAD was attached to the division. On 2 February the division returned to the front in Champagne and reoccupied its old sector between Maisons de Champagne and the Aisne, where it would remain through the spring and into the summer. In March 1918 the 6th group (155 mm) from the 108^{e} RAC replaced the 11th group. In July the 16^{e} DI was engaged in the Fourth Battle of Champagne, fighting at the Main de Massiges.

On 24 July the division was pulled off the front to recover near Herpent before being redeployed to Ay on 27 July. The 16th Division was then involved in the Second Battle of the Marne, fighting near Sainte-Euphraise and along the Ardre. Going on the offensive the division progressed as far as the Vesle and then dug-in, occupying positions between Jonchery-sur-Vesle and Muizon in September. In August 1918 a pioneer battalion from the 24th Territorial Infantry Regiment (24^{e} Régiment d'Infanterie Territoriale, 24^{e} RIT) was attached to the division.

From 30 September 1918 the 16th Division participated in the Meuse-Argonne Offensive, fighting at the Battle of Saint-Thierry. The 16^{e} DI successfully crossed the Vesle, the Aisne-Marne Canal, the Suippe, and the Retourne before finally breaching the Aisne on 13 October. The unit then fortified its position between le Thour and Nizy-le-Comte. From 20 October the 16^{e} DI fought in the Battle of the Serre in the vicinity of Recouvrance. On 1 November 1918 the division was pulled off the front for rest near Saint-Imoges, where it remained at the time of the armistice.

== World War II ==
The 16^{e} Division d'Infanterie was mobilized in the 8th Military Region on 2 September 1939, as a series A reserve division under the command of General Marquis. On 15 November General Eugène Mordant assumed command of the division. At the time of the German invasion on 10 May 1940, the composition of the 16e DI was as follows:

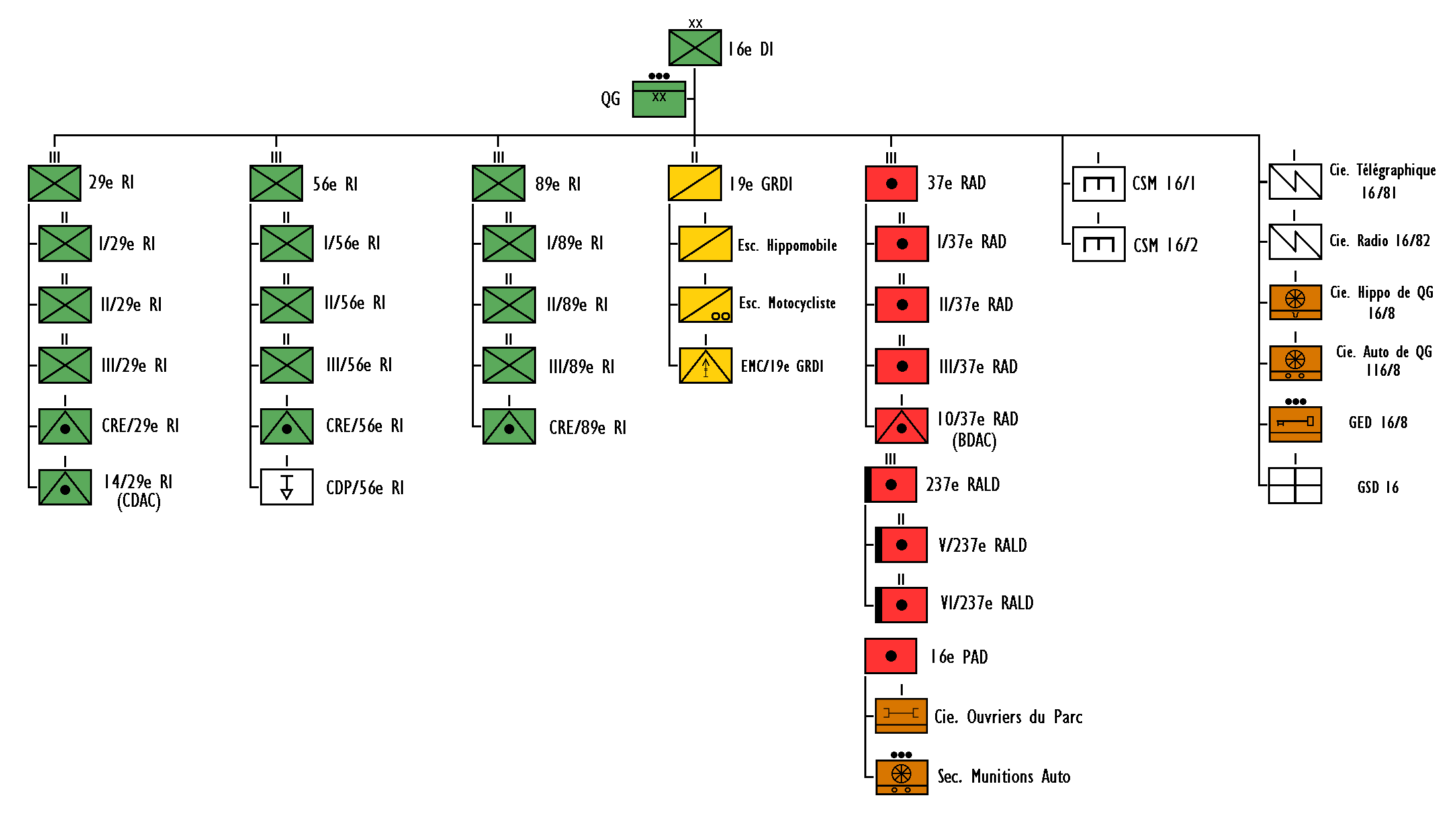
An organizational diagram of the 16^{e} DI's composition in May 1940.

- 29th Infantry Regiment (29^{e} Régiment d'Infanterie, 29^{e} RI)
  - Including Divisional Anti-Tank Company (Compagnie Divisionnaire Anti-Chars, CDAC), with 25 mm SA 34 anti-tank guns.
- 85th Infantry Regiment (85^{e} Régiment d'Infanterie, 85^{e} RI)
  - Including Divisional Pioneer Company (Compagnie Divisionnaire de Pioniers, CDP).
- 89th Infantry Regiment (89^{e} Régiment d'Infanterie, 89^{e} RI)
- 19th Divisional Reconnaissance Group (19^{e} Groupe de Reconnaissance de Division d'Infanterie, 19^{e} GRDI)
- 37th Divisional Artillery Regiment (37^{e} Régiment d'Artillerie Divisionnaire, 37^{e} RAD)
  - Composed of three 75 mm groups plus Divisional Anti-Tank Battery (Batterie Divisionnaire Anti-Chars, BDAC) with 47 mm SA 37 anti-tank guns
- 237th Divisional Heavy Artillery Regiment (237^{e} Régiment d'Artillerie Lourde Divisionnaire, 237^{e} RALD)
  - Two 155 mm groups.
- 16th Divisional Artillery Park (16^{e} Parc d'Artillerie Divisionnaire, 16^{e} PAD)
- Engineer Companies 16/1 and 16/2 (Compagnie de Sapeurs-Mineurs 16/1 and 16/2, CSM 16/1 and 16/2)
- Telegraph Company 16/81 (Compagnie Télégraphique 16/81)
- Radio Company 16/82 (Compagnie Radiotélégraphique 16/82)
- Horse-drawn Headquarters Transport Company 16/8 (Compagnie Hippomobile de QG 16/8)
- Motorized Headquarters Transport Company 116/8 (Compagnie Automobile de QG 116/8)
- Divisional Quartermaster Group 16/8 (Groupe d'Exploitation Divisionnaire 16/8)
- Divisional Medical Group 16 (Groupe Sanitaire Divisionnaire 16)

=== Operational history ===
On 13 September 1939 the division was assigned to the 5th Army, and on 3 October to the 5th Army's XII^{e} Army Corps. As part of the XII^{e} Corps the 16^{e} DI was deployed in the northeast of France along the Maginot Line, close to the Franco-German border. Relieving the 15^{e} DI north of Bitche in the Fortified Sector of Haguenau, the 16^{e} DI occupied the Pechelbronn Sector from 8 October 1939, reinforcing the 165th Fortress Infantry Regiment (165^{e} RIF) which occupied the Maginot Line bunkers in the sector and participating in the construction of anti-tank obstacles. While deployed along the border the division participated in a number of skirmishes and local actions before being relieved by the 70^{e} DI on 5 December. The division remained in winter quarters until February 1940.

On 15 February 1940 the 16th Division was ordered to relieve the 23^{e} DI and take over the Lauter-Rhine sector. During late winter and early spring the division continued to work on fortifications in the sector and carry out patrols. In April advance posts began to report increased movement of German troops and heavy rail traffic. On 10 May 1940 the Nazi German invasion of Belgium, France and the Netherlands began, and the 16^{e} DI came under bombardment from German artillery. On 14 May German forces launched attacks along the Lauter, gradually forcing the 16^{e} DI to withdraw its advance posts back towards the Maginot Line. Unable to overcome the heavier French fortifications the German advance halted after taking the first line of outposts. On 24 May the division received orders to prepare for departure from its positions.

On 26 May 1940, the division was withdrawn to the GQG Reserve before being transferred to the west, where it was reassigned to the X^{e} Corps under General Gransard, part of General Aubert Frère's 7th Army.

On 1 June 1940 the 16^{e} Division d'Infanterie relieved the 7th Colonial Infantry Division (7^{e} Division d'Infanterie Coloniale, 7^{e} DIC) south of the German bridgehead at Amiens. The 16^{e} DI held a 12 km stretch of the front line with its three infantry regiments dug in to form defensive hedgehogs as part of a defense-in-depth, following instructions issued by General Weygand. Each village in the division's sector for a depth of 10 km was defended by at least one anti-tank gun, with a number of 75 mm guns also deployed in an anti-tank role. Anti-tank mines had also been laid in this sector. The 29^{e} RI held the division's left flank between the Selle and the Amiens-Paris road, the 56^{e} RI held the center, fortifying the villages of Dury, Grattepanche, Hébecourt, Petit-Cagny, Rumigny, and Saint-Sauflieu, while the 89^{e} RI held the right flank, occupying the villages of Saint-Fuscien, Sains-en-Amiénois et Estrées-sur-Noye. The division's artillery was reinforced by motorized 75 mm batteries of the 306^{e} RAP as well as the 155 mm heavy guns of the Xe Corps. However, this defensive organization left the 16^{e} DI stretched thin, with no reserve forces save for the 19^{e} GRDI and 12 Renault R 35 light tanks from the 12th Tank Battalion (12^{e} Bataillon de Chars de Combat, 12^{e} BCC).

The German Case Red operation - the final offensive aimed at breaking the French defenses on the Somme and taking Paris - began on 5 June 1940 with a bombardment at 0400 hours. The German 10th Panzer Division, under Major General Ferdinand Schaal, was tasked with breaking through the front held by the 16^{e} DI. Schaal launched his attack at 0530, ordering the motorized infantry of the 10th Schützen Brigade to seize the French strongpoint of Saint-Fuscien, held by the 3rd battalion of the 89^{e} RI. Heavy fire from the entrenched defenders coupled with supporting artillery fire stopped the German attack cold and led to an hours-long stalemate until the afternoon, when the attackers were forced to fall back and reorganize. The Germans would not manage to take control of the village until 1900, after nearly 14 hours of combat. An early morning attack on the 56^{e} RI's positions at Dury was also repulsed by 1000. The Germans launched a renewed attack in the afternoon which left a large portion of the village in flames, and, short of ammunition and cutoff from resupply, the defenders were forced to gradually give ground, but continued to hold the center of Dury as night fell.

Tank units of 10th Panzer attempted to bypass the French positions, but suffered considerable losses from concealed anti-tank guns, with the French 47mm guns proving particularly effective. Eight tanks from the 4th Panzer Brigade were knocked out by French fire, with a further Panzer IV disabled by an anti-tank mine. As the 7th Panzer Regiment approached the village of Sains-en-Amiénois it was engaged at a range of 500 meters by four 75 mm guns belonging to the 5th battery of the 37^{e} RAD. The minutes-long engagement that followed resulted in the deaths of 28 out of 32 French gunners and the destruction of 12 German tanks.

By the afternoon the tanks of the 4th Panzer Brigade were approaching the French artillery positions at Oresmaux-Grattepanche, but with most of the 10th Panzer Division's infantry still pinned in place by the 89^{e} RI at St.-Fuscien, the tanks had little infantry support and were continuing to suffer losses to anti-tank and artillery fire. At 1830 General Mordant ordered a counterattack by his mobile reserves to relieve the artillery. While three R 35s of the 12^{e} BCC were destroyed the German tanks, overstretched and short on ammunition, were forced to pull back. By day's end the 10th Panzer Division had lost roughly 100 tanks attacking the 16th Division's positions, over half the division's total tank strength.

On 6 June the German advance was more methodical, with the mobile units of the XIV Army Corps (Mot.) mostly mopping up isolated French positions. Under continued pressure from German tanks and air power the 16e DI was gradually forced to fall back, establishing a new defensive line on the road between Essertaux and Ailly, but opening a dangerous gap between the 16^{e} DI and the 4th Colonial Infantry Division on the right flank. Steadily forced to withdraw as the French front collapsed at multiple points, General Gransard pulled the 16^{e} DI out of the front line to rest and reorganize, with the 24^{e} DI taking over its positions. From 5 to 9 June the 16^{e} Division had destroyed 196 German tanks, with the German XIV Corps having lost 55% of its armored vehicles and 40% of its infantry during fighting along the Somme.

On 10 June the division occupied a defensive position along the Oise. On 11 and 12 June the division repulsed German attempts to cross the Oise but came under increasingly heavy air and artillery bombardment. On the night of 12–13 June the division was ordered to withdraw to the south, it passed Paris to the north east via Porte de la Chapelle continuing to Juvisy. On 14 June the 16e DI was ordered to defend the Orgre. During the afternoon the division came under renewed pressure with the 29^{e} RI repulsing an attack by German armored vehicles. On 15 June the 89^{e} RI withstood a German attack on Juvisy. By late afternoon Gen. Mordant discovered that the flanks of the division were exposed due to the retreat of neighboring units and at 1700 ordered a retreat under the cover of light rearguard forces. In the evening the division was ordered to pull back across the Loire at Châteauneuf. However, the exhausted units of the 16^{e} DI became scattered and on 16 June the battered division was encircled and largely destroyed by German mechanized forces before reaching the Loire, with only a few small groups managing to escape. On 26 June 1940 the surviving elements of the 16^{e} Division d'Infanterie were assembled at Beaumont-en-Périgord and then demobilized.

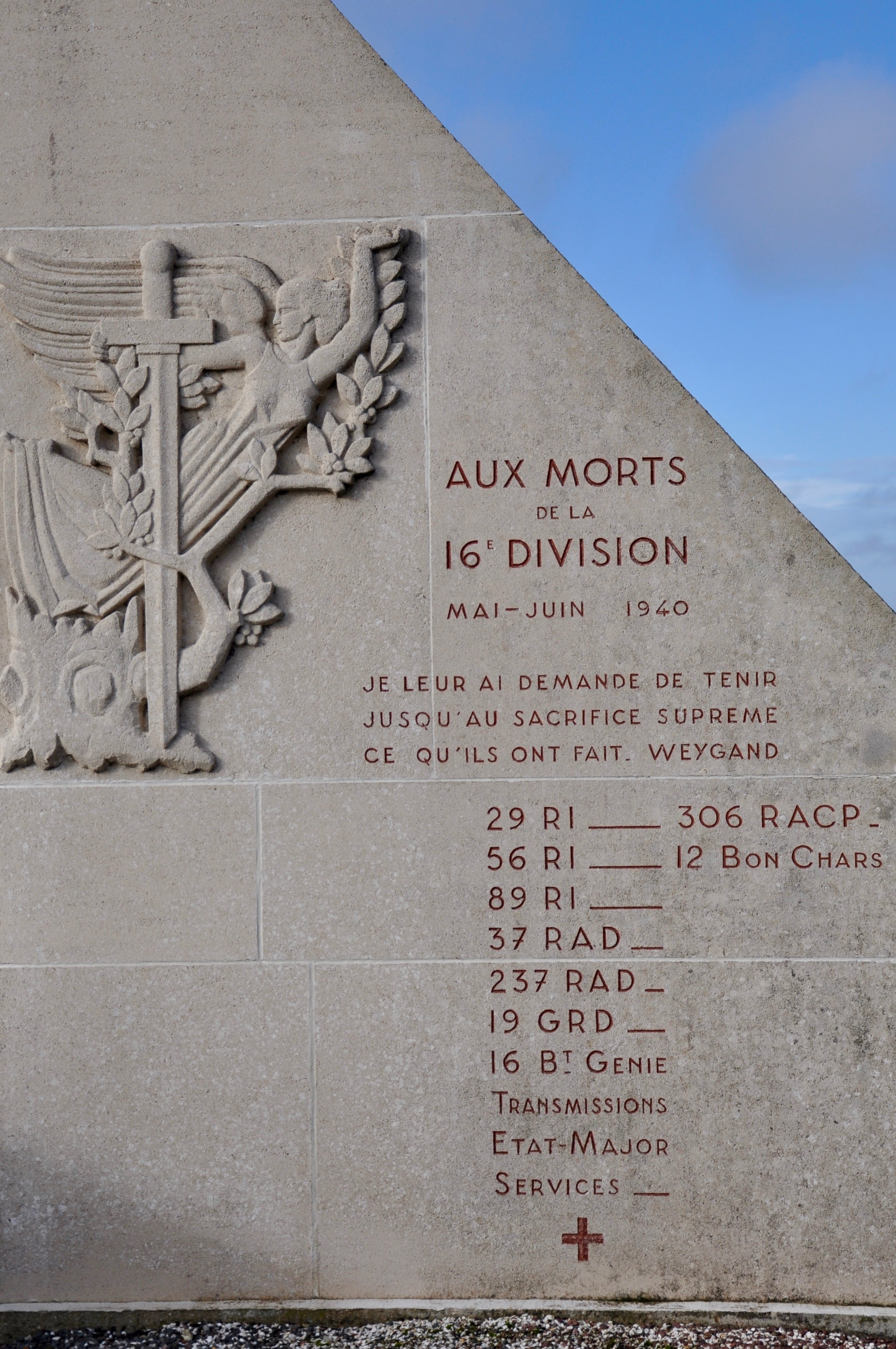
Monument to the 16e DI at Hébécourt (Somme).

== Monuments and memorials ==
There is a monument to the 16th Infantry Division and its constituent units at Hébécourt.
