= Blangy =

Blangy may refer to:

== Places ==
- Blangy—Glisy station, a closed railway in the Picardy region of France
- Blangy-sous-Poix, a commune in the Somme department in northern France
- Blangy-sur-Bresle, a commune in the Calvados department in the Normandy region in northwestern France
  - Blangy-sur-Bresle station, a railway station in the commune Blangy-sur-Bresle
- Blangy-sur-Ternoise, a commune in the Pas-de-Calais department in northern France
- Blangy-Tronville, a commune in the Somme department in the Hauts-de-France in northern France
- Canton of Blangy-sur-Bresle, a former canton situated in the Seine-Maritime département and in the Haute-Normandie region of northern France
- Le Mesnil-sur-Blangy, a commune in the Calvados department in the Normandy region in northwestern France
- Saint-Laurent-Blangy, a commune in the Pas-de-Calais department in the Hauts-de-France region of France

== People ==
- Hermine Blangy (1820–1865), French ballet dancer
