= Blangy—Glisy station =

Railway station in Blangy-Tronville, France

Coordinates: 49°52′42″N 2°24′39″E

Blangy—Glisy

General information
- Location: Blangy-Tronville; Somme; France
- Owner: SNCF
- Tracks: 2

Other information
- Status: Closed
Location

Blangy—Glisy station (French: Gare de Blangy—Glisy) is a closed railway station in the Picardy region of France. It was served by trains of the TER Picardie regional rail network. The station is located half-way between the villages of Blangy-Tronville and Glisy. As of 2010, it is served by a TER taxi service.

== Services ==
Two TER Picardie rail lines served Blangy-Glisy:

- Amiens - Laon - Reims
- Amiens - Saint-Quentin
