= Rumigny =

Rumigny may refer to:

- Rumigny, Ardennes, a commune in France
- Rumigny, Somme, a commune in France
