= Canton of Amiens-6 =

Coordinates: 49.89°N 2.30°E

Amiens-6
- Canton
- Interactive map of Amiens-6
- Country: France
- Region: Hauts-de-France
- Department: Somme
- No. of communes: {{{nbcomm}}}
- Population (2023): 29,402
- INSEE code: 80 11

The Canton of Amiens-6 is a canton situated in the department of the Somme and in the Hauts-de-France region of northern France.

== Geography ==
The canton is organised around the commune of Amiens in the arrondissement of Amiens.

== Composition ==
At the French canton reorganisation which came into effect in March 2015, the canton was expanded from 1 to 6 communes:

- Amiens (southwestern part)
- Dury
- Hébécourt
- Rumigny
- Sains-en-Amiénois
- Saint-Fuscien

== See also ==
- Arrondissements of the Somme department
- Cantons of the Somme department
- Communes of the Somme department
