= Victoricus, Fuscian, and Gentian =

Saints Victoricus, Fuscian and Gentian
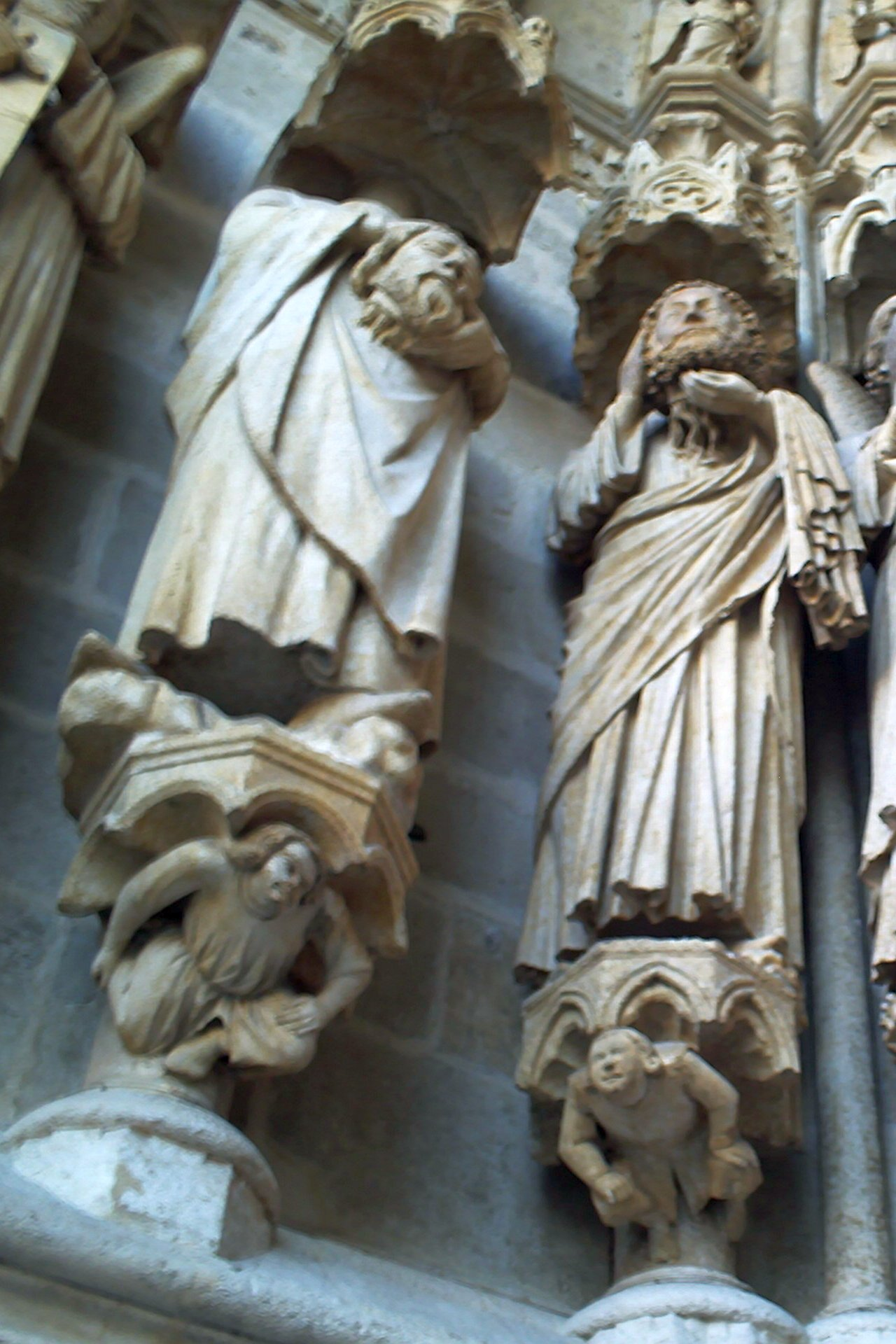
- Saints Ache and Acheul, depicted on the northern portal of Amiens Cathedral as an example of cephalophores
- Born: 3rd century A.D.
- Died: 287 A.D.
- Martyred by: Rictius Varus
- Means of martyrdom: Beheading
- Venerated in: Eastern Orthodox Church; Roman Catholic Church
- Feast: 11 December

Victoricus (or Victorice, Victoric), Fuscian (or Fulcian, Fulcien, Fuscien) and Gentian (or Gentien) (died circa 287–303) were three Christian martyrs later venerated as Roman Catholic saints. Their feast day falls on 11 December.

== Hagiography ==
According to tradition, Victoricus and Fuscian were missionaries from the city of Rome. They were preaching the Christian religion in the city of Therouanne, and in the areas inhabited by the people known as the Morini. They were followers of Saint Quentin, as well as of Crispin and Crispinian.

Near Amiens, they met Gentian, who warned them that Christians were being killed for their faith. Later, the governor Rictius Varus (Rictiovarus) questioned Gentian about the whereabouts of Victoricus and Fuscian. Gentian refused to tell him and was consequently beheaded. According to the Golden Legend, the governor later brought Victoricus and Fuscian to Amiens. "Then took spears of iron and put them through their ears and through their nostrils, and had them decapitated. And by the will and power of our Lord, they arose up, and took their heads in their hands, and bare them two miles far from the place where they had been beheaded." It is said that all three were buried at the place called Saint-Fuscien.

== Veneration ==
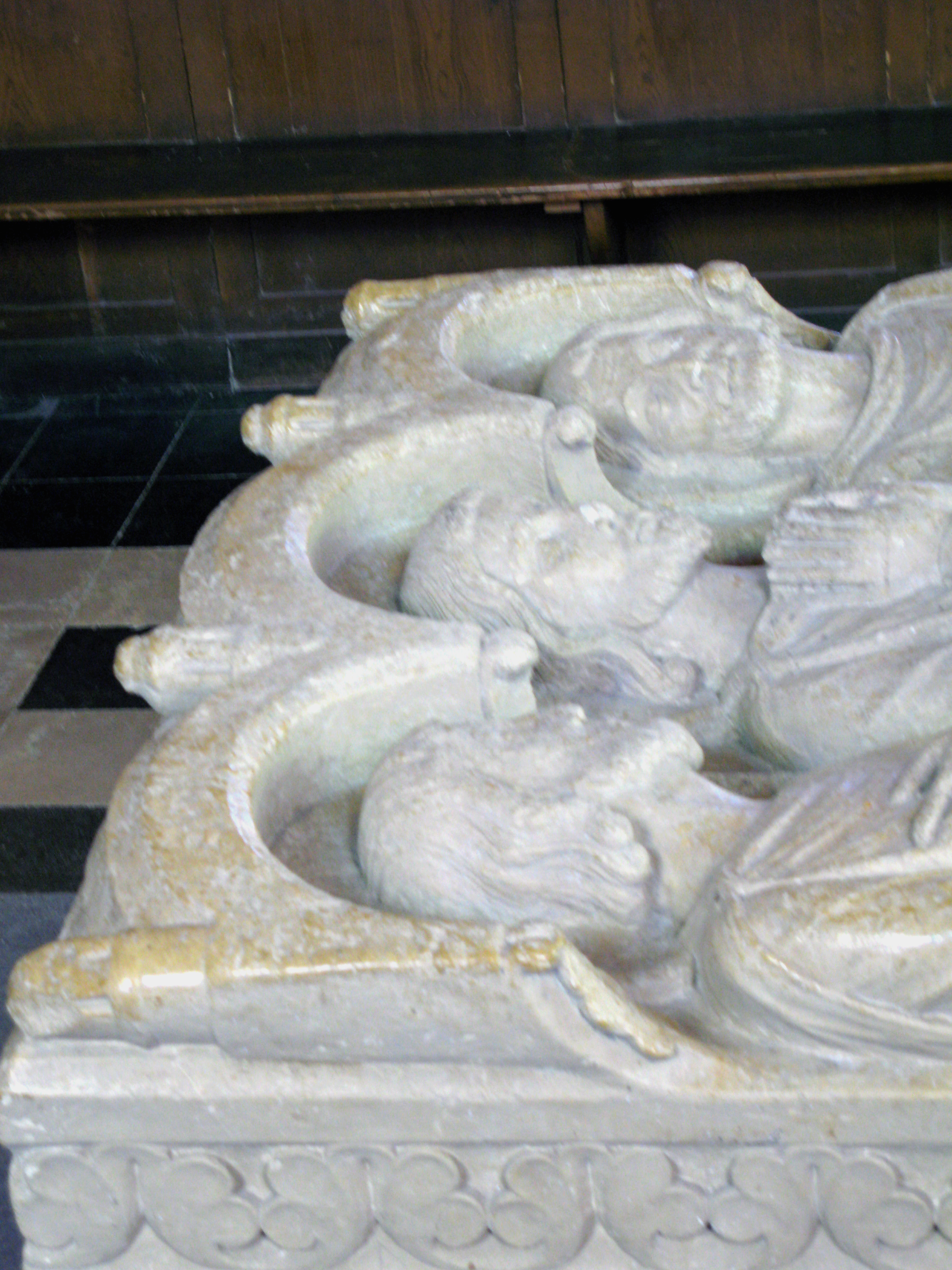
Tomb of the three saints in the church of Sains-en-Amiénois.

It is said that Honoratus of Amiens, seventh bishop of Amiens (d. ca. 600), had discovered in his diocese the relics of these martyrs. Childebert attempted to possess these relics, but was prevented from removing them. Subsequently, the king made generous gifts to endow the cult of the three saints and sent goldsmiths to fashion decorative pieces in their honour.

Statues of Fuscian, Gentian and Victoricus stand in the left portal of Amiens Cathedral.

During the 7th century, Saint Audomare (Omer) re-evangelized the same area.
