= Canton of Amiens-4 =

Coordinates: 49.88°N 2.33°E

Amiens-4
- Canton
- Interactive map of Amiens-4
- Country: France
- Region: Hauts-de-France
- Department: Somme
- No. of communes: {{{nbcomm}}}
- Population (2023): 24,996
- INSEE code: 80 09

The Canton of Amiens-4 is a canton situated in the department of the Somme and in the Hauts-de-France region of northern France.

== Geography ==
The canton is organised around the commune of Amiens in the arrondissement of Amiens.

== Composition ==
At the French canton reorganisation which came into effect in March 2015, the canton was expanded from 2 to 7 communes:

- Amiens (southeastern part)
- Blangy-Tronville
- Cachy
- Gentelles
- Glisy
- Longueau
- Villers-Bretonneux

== See also ==
- Arrondissements of the Somme department
- Cantons of the Somme department
- Communes of the Somme department
