= Mortier de 150 mm T Mle 1916 Batignolles =

Mortier de 150 mm T Modèle 1916 Batignolles
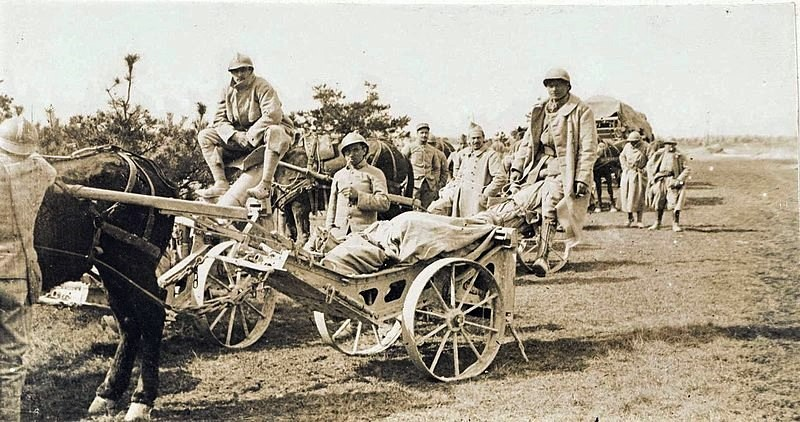
- Type: Heavy trench mortar
- Place of origin: France

Service history
- In service: 1916 - 1918
- Used by: France
- Wars: World War I

Production history
- Designed: 1915
- Manufacturer: Société de Construction des Batignolles
- Produced: 1916-1917
- No. built: 400

Specifications
- Mass: 510 kg
- Barrel length: 1800 mm
- Diameter: 150 mm
- Shell: 75 mm shell primed bush cut to 200 mm
- Calibre: 150 mm
- Carriage: wheeled carriage
- Elevation: 10° - 75°
- Traverse: 16°
- Rate of fire: 3 rpm
- Muzzle velocity: 140 m/s
- Maximum firing range: 2,120 m

The Mortier de 150 mm T Modèle 1916 Batignolles was a French heavy trench mortar of World War I.

== Service ==
Designed in 1915, it entered service in May 1916. 400 were manufactured by the Société de Construction des Batignolles, out of an order of 600 reduced to 400 in 1917. Replaced by the Mortier de 150 mm T Mle 1917 Fabry, 264 remained in service in November 1918. Most were scrapped after the end of the war.

== Specifications ==
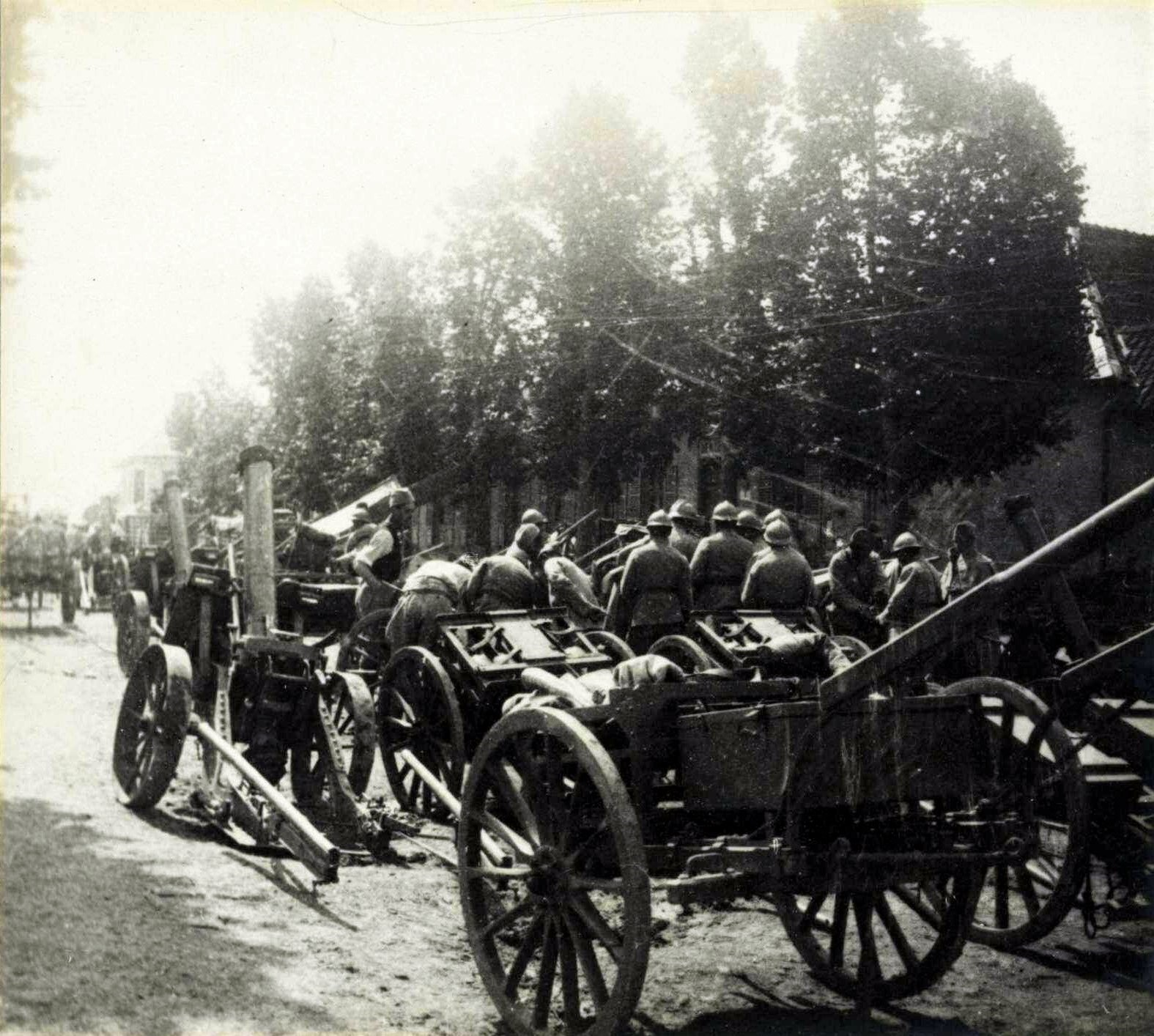
Mle 1916 mortars in Caix, Somme, 1916.

The mortar was placed on a wheeled carriage to increase its mobility. A single horse or mule could be used to tow the carriage.

The propellant charge was made from a canon de 75 mm shell primed bush cut to 200 mm and was loaded into the breech, while the finned bomb was loaded through the muzzle.

Fired from its wheeled carriage, it proved to be fairly inaccurate. Its accuracy was improved by the use of a wooden platform for firing and by replacing the original bomb with the Fabry mortar Mle 1917 bomb.
