= Battle of Flirey =

1914 battle on the Western Front of WWI

- Part of The First World War
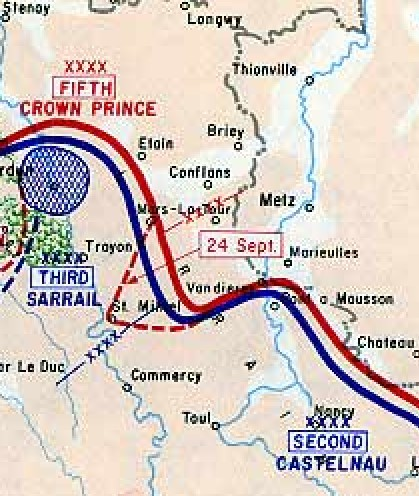
- Map of the battle, with the fortified city of Verdun in the top left
Date	19 September – 11 October 1914
Location	Around Flirey, France 48°52′35″N 05°50′54″E
Result	German victory

Belligerents
France	German Empire

Commanders and leaders
Maurice Sarrail; Noel de Castelnau	Crown Prince Rupprecht

Units involved
Third Army	6th Army
- Flirey: commune in the Meurthe-et-Moselle department in north-eastern France

The Battle of Flirey (French: 1re Bataille de Flirey) took place in the First World War and was fought from 19 September to 11 October 1914. The German Army defeated the French. The battle cut most of the roads and railways to the Fortified Region of Verdun (Région Fortifiée de Verdun [RFV]) and had a considerable effect on the rest of the war on the Western Front.

== Background ==
The Woëvre Plain stretches from the city of Luxemburg, south to the French city of Toul and has been a common route of attack between Germany and France. The plain is flanked on the western side by a series of mountain ranges (the Hauts de Meuse) along the Meuse River and along the eastern side by a series of mountain ranges along the Moselle River. A series of German fortifications was built before the war along the Moselle (especially around the city of Metz), and across the border, a matching set of French fortifications was established along the Meuse around Verdun and Toul.

In the first months of the war, Oberste Heeresleitung (OHL, German High Command) first realised the increased effectiveness that artillery and machine guns gave to the defence and seized various terrain features that would be easy to defend. Recognising that it is easier to defend the heights along the Meuse than the plain between the Moselle and Meuse, a German attack was planned to seize the heights, deny access to the Woëvre Plain to the Allies, isolate Verdun and reduce the ability of the French to attack German territory.

== Battle ==
The attack commenced on 19 September, with German cavalry from Metz skirmishing with the French defenders in the Dieulouard–Martincourt area. Flirey, the woods around the village and the village of Seicheprey were quickly captured. French reinforcements arrived on 22 September but could not stop the Germans from advancing. The German advance then changed direction by moving from southerly to south-westerly. By 24 September, the town of Saint-Mihiel was captured and villages of Flirey, Seicheprey and Xivray recaptured. More French reinforcements arrived on 27 September but as the Germans were now firmly entrenched, French counter-attacks between Flirey and Apremont resulted in little change in the front line and continued until 11 October.

== Aftermath ==
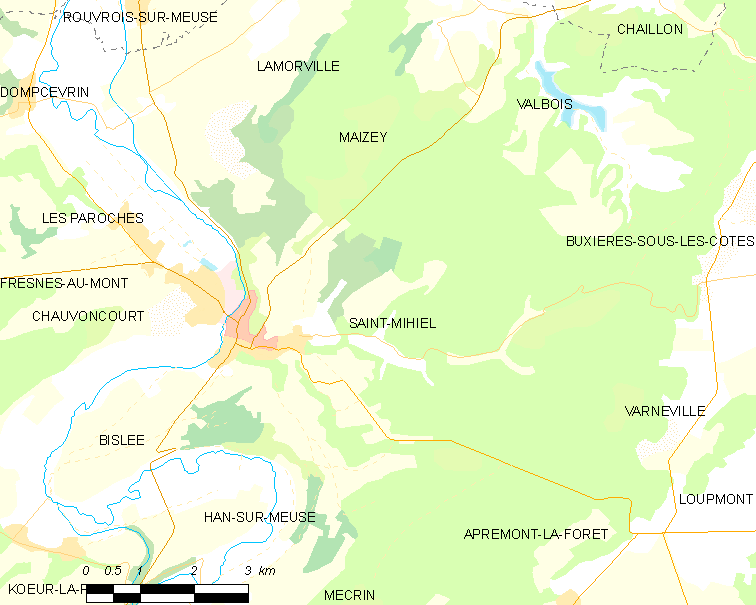
Map of Saint-Mihiel and vicinity (commune FR insee code 55463)

The battle created the Saint-Mihiel salient projecting into the French lines south of Verdun. Of the two roads and one railway that led to Verdun, only a minor road remained open, which imposed severe supply difficulties on the French troops in the RFV. The city was enveloped on three sides and neutralised as a base for French offensive operations. The area would see much fighting over the rest of the war. Despite attempts by the French to reduce the salient in the First Battle of Woëvre in early 1915, the First Offensive Battle of Verdun in late 1916 and the Second Offensive Battle of Verdun in 1917, the salient was not reduced until the Battle of Saint-Mihiel in September 1918.

== Sources ==
- Der Herbst-Feldzug 1914: Im Westen bis zum Stellungskrieg, im Osten bis zum Rückzug. Der Weltkrieg 1914 bis 1918: Militärischen Operationen zu Lande (in German). Vol. I (online scan ed.). Berlin: Verlag Ernst Siegfried Mittler & Sohn. 1929. OCLC 838299944 – via Die Digitale Landesbibliothek Oberösterreich.
- Doughty, R. A. (2005). Pyrrhic victory: French Strategy and Operations in the Great War. Cambridge, Massachusetts: Belknap Press. ISBN 978-0-674-01880-8.
- Herwig, H. (2009). The Marne, 1914: The Opening of World War I and the Battle that Changed the World. New York: Random House. ISBN 978-1-4000-6671-1.
- Strachan, H. (2001). To Arms. The First World War. Vol. I. Oxford: OUP. ISBN 978-0-19-926191-8.
- Tyng, S. (2007) [1935]. The Campaign of the Marne 1914 (Westholme ed.). New York: Longmans. ISBN 978-1-59416-042-4.
