= Apremont, Ardennes =

Apremont
- Commune
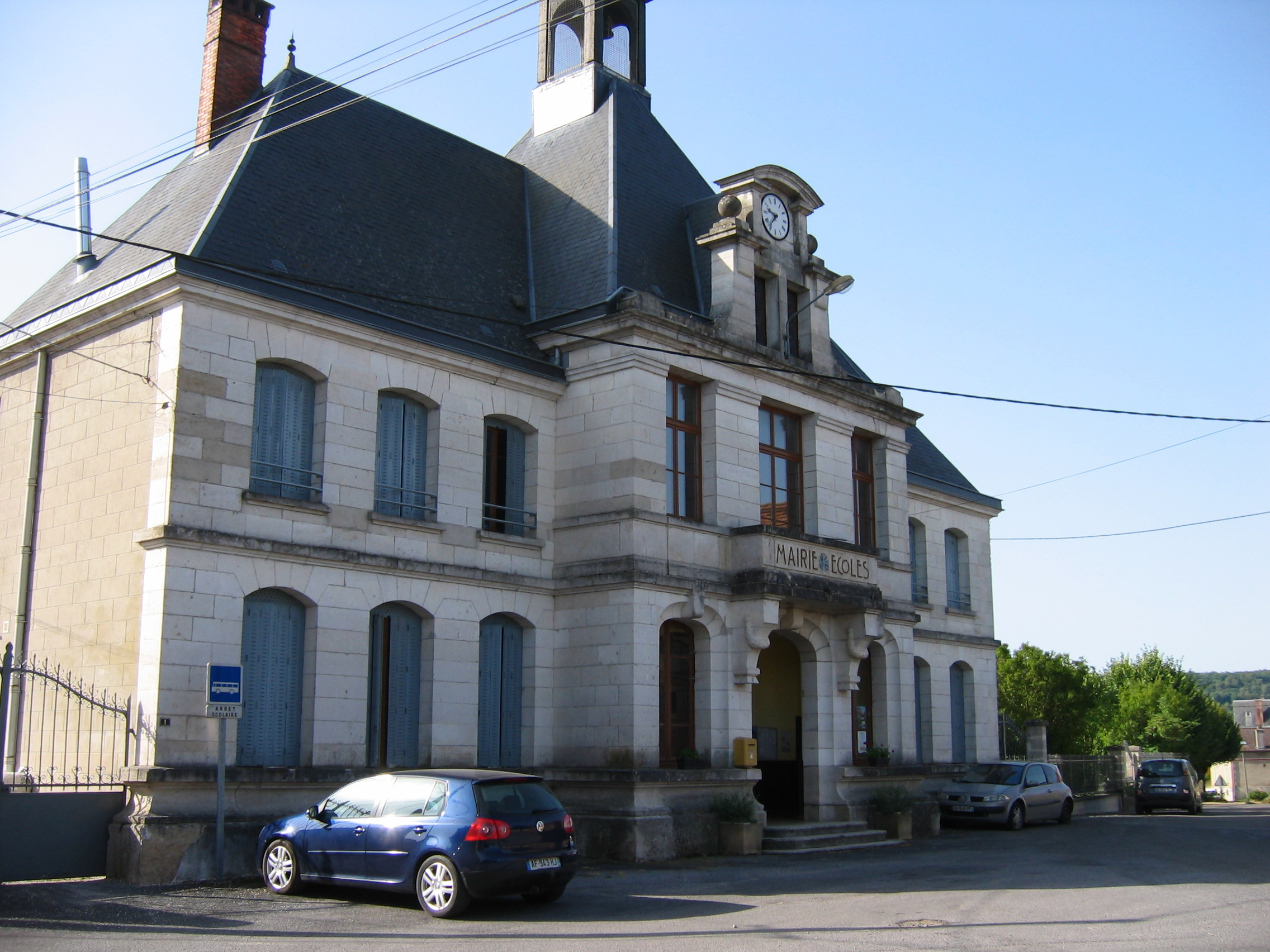
- The town hall in Apremont

- Coat of arms
- Location of Apremont
- Location within France Location within Grand Est
- Coordinates: 49°16′11″N 4°59′10″E
- Country: France
- Region: Grand Est
- Department: Ardennes
- Arrondissement: Vouziers
- Canton: Attigny
- Intercommunality: Argonne Ardennaise

Government
  - Mayor (2020–2026): Bernard Deguy
- Area^{1}: 12.86 km^{2} (4.97 sq mi)
- Highest elevation: 247 m (810 ft)
- Lowest elevation: 137 m (449 ft)
- Population (2023): 122
  - Density: 9.49/km^{2} (24.6/sq mi)
- Time zone: UTC+01:00 (CET)
  - Summer (DST): UTC+02:00 (CEST)
- INSEE/Postal code: 08017 /08250
- ^{1} French Land Register data, which excludes lakes, ponds, glaciers > 1 km^{2} (0.386 sq mi or 247 acres) and river estuaries.

Apremont (French pronunciation: [apʁəmɔ̃]) is a commune in the department of Ardennes in the Grand Est region of northern France.

== Geography ==
Apremont is located some 40 km north-west of Verdun, 6 km north-west of Varennes-en-Argonne, and 5 km south-east of Fléville. The south-western border of the commune is the border between the departments of Ardennes and Marne while the south-eastern border is the border between Ardennes and Meuse departments. Access to the commune is by the D946 road from Fléville in the north-west passing through the eastern part of the commune and continuing to Varennes-en-Argonne. Access to the village is by the D242 running off the D946. There are also the D42 road from Chatel-Chéhéry to the north to the village and the D442 from the village west to the commune border where it becomes the D66 and continues to join the D63. More than half of the commune is heavily forested in the west while the smaller eastern portion is farmland.

The Aire river flows through the commune from west to east near the village and forms part of the northern border of the commune. The Ruisseau de Chaudron flows from the north-east into the Aire.

== History ==
On April 18, 1918, French and American troops fought German forces near the town. Many participants were from Massachusetts and there is a park in Westfield, Massachusetts to honor those who fought in the battle. In October 1918 this town was the site of a battle between the U.S. Army's 28th (Pennsylvania) Division and German forces.

== Administration ==
List of Successive Mayors

From	To	Name
2001	2008	Christophe Rogie
2008	2020	Suzanne Raulin
2020	current	Bernard Deguy

== Demography ==
Historical population

Year	Pop.	±% p.a.
1793	467	—
1821	547	+0.57%
1846	672	+0.83%
1872	682	+0.06%
1901	629	−0.28%
1921	183	−5.99%
1936	306	+3.49%
1946	234	−2.65%
1962	221	−0.36%

Year	Pop.	±% p.a.
1968	207	−1.08%
1975	165	−3.19%
1982	140	−2.32%
1990	109	−3.08%
1999	118	+0.89%
2007	129	+1.12%
2012	129	+0.00%
2017	117	−1.93%
2023	122	+0.70%

Source: EHESS and INSEE

== See also ==
- Communes of the Ardennes department

=== External links ===
- Apremont on the old National Geographic Institute website (in French)
- Apremont on Géoportail, National Geographic Institute (IGN) website (in French)
- Apremont on the 1750 Cassini Map
