= Cachy =

- Commune
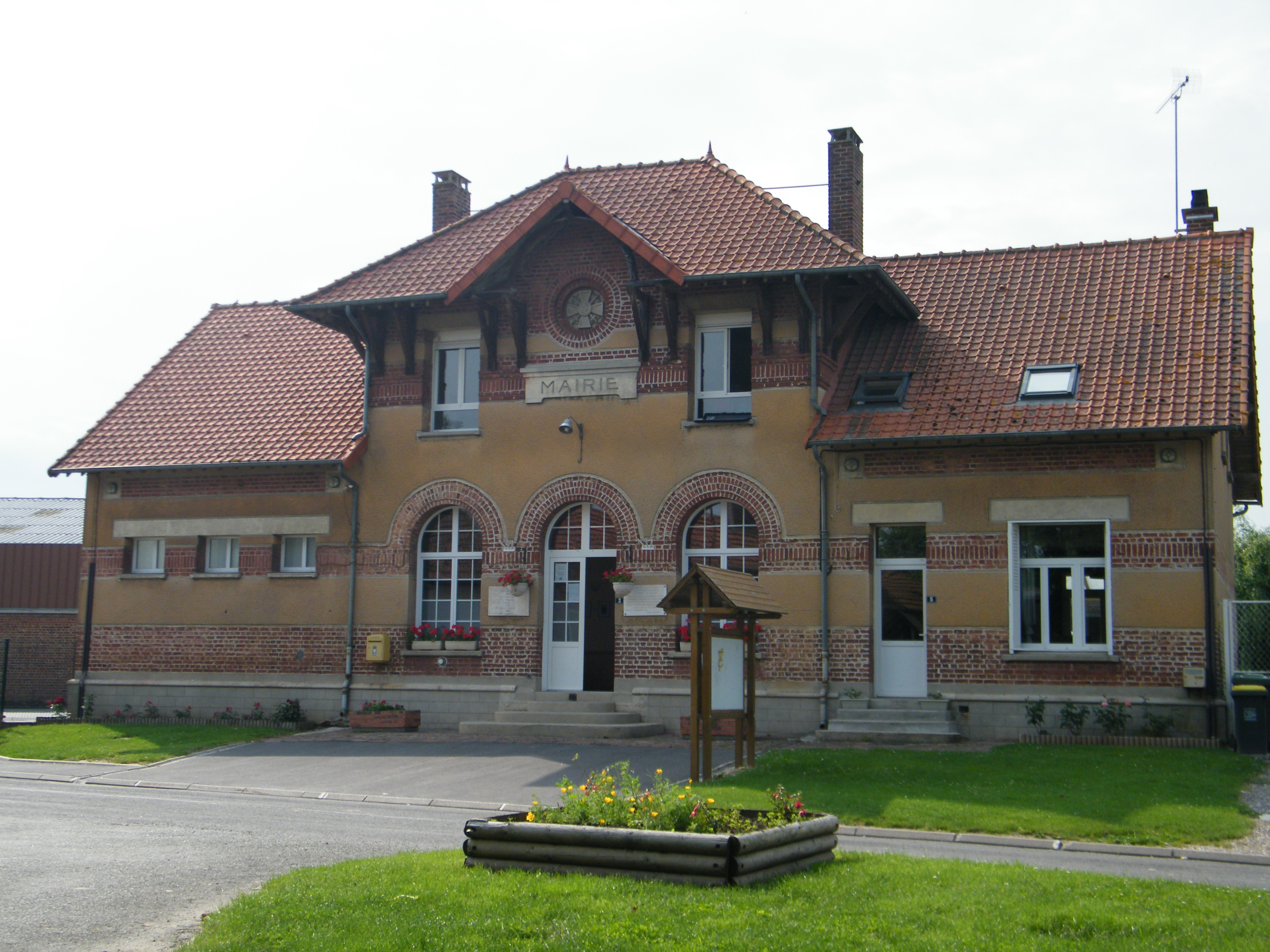
- The town hall and school of Cachy
- Location of Cachy
- Location within France Location within Hauts-de-France
- Coordinates: 49°51′10″N 2°28′51″E
- Country: France
- Region: Hauts-de-France
- Department: Somme
- Arrondissement: Amiens
- Canton: Amiens-4
- Intercommunality: Val de Somme

Government
  - Mayor (2020–2026): François Debeugny
- Area^{1}: 6.11 km^{2} (2.36 sq mi)
- Elevation: 100 m (330 ft)
- Highest elevation: 112 m (367 ft)
- Lowest elevation: 54 m (177 ft)
- Population (2023): 300
  - Density: 49/km^{2} (130/sq mi)
- Time zone: UTC+01:00 (CET)
  - Summer (DST): UTC+02:00 (CEST)
- INSEE/Postal code: 80159 /80800
- ^{1} French Land Register data, which excludes lakes, ponds, glaciers > 1 km^{2} (0.386 sq mi or 247 acres) and river estuaries.

Cachy (French pronunciation: [kaʃi]; Picard: Cachin) is a commune in the Somme department in Hauts-de-France in northern France.

== Geography ==
Cachy is situated on the D168 road, some 9 miles (14 km) southeast of Amiens and near to Villers-Bretonneux.

== Population ==
Historical population
Year	Pop.	±% p.a.
1968	121	—
1975	110	−1.35%
1982	157	+5.21%
1990	166	+0.70%
1999	227	+3.54%
2007	248	+1.11%
2012	273	+1.94%
2017	282	+0.65%
2023	300	+1.04%
Source: INSEE

== See also ==
- Communes of the Somme department
