= Gentelles =

- Commune
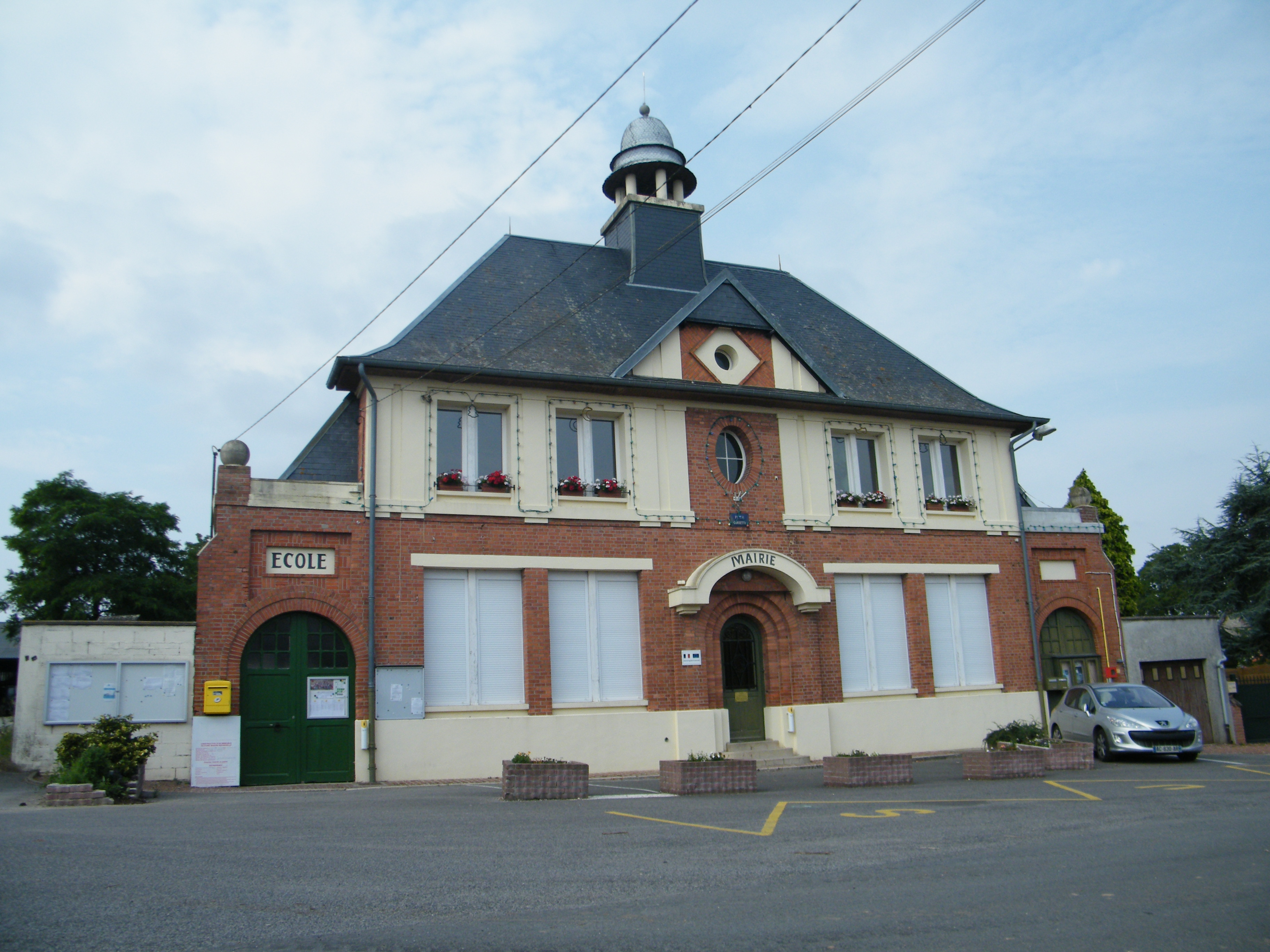
- The town hall in Gentelles
- Location of Gentelles
- Location within France Location within Hauts-de-France
- Coordinates: 49°50′45″N 2°27′28″E
- Country: France
- Region: Hauts-de-France
- Department: Somme
- Arrondissement: Amiens
- Canton: Amiens-4
- Intercommunality: Val de Somme

Government
  - Mayor (2020–2026): Xavier Commecy
- Area^{1}: 5.57 km^{2} (2.15 sq mi)
- Elevation: 117 m (384 ft)
- Highest elevation: 118 m (387 ft)
- Lowest elevation: 65 m (213 ft)
- Population (2023): 627
  - Density: 113/km^{2} (292/sq mi)
- Time zone: UTC+01:00 (CET)
  - Summer (DST): UTC+02:00 (CEST)
- INSEE/Postal code: 80376 /80800
- ^{1} French Land Register data, which excludes lakes, ponds, glaciers > 1 km^{2} (0.386 sq mi or 247 acres) and river estuaries.

Gentelles (French pronunciation: [ʒɑ̃tɛl]) is a commune in the Somme department in Hauts-de-France in northern France. It is part of the arrondissement of Amiens and the canton of Amiens-4.

== Geography ==
Gentelles is situated on the D168 road, some 8 miles (13 km) southeast of Amiens.

== History ==
The village has been known by various name through its history: Gentilla, Gentella, Gentèle, Gentela, Gentelles, Gentilles, Le Gendalle and finally Gentelles.

It was the first town to be given to the abbey of Corbie by Clovis II and Saint Bathilde.

On November 27, 1870, during the Franco-Prussian War, Gentelles was the scene of a skirmish between the 20th Battalion of Chasseurs and the Germans. There were 25 fatalities, of which 12 were French, who are buried in the cemetery, where later a memorial was erected.

During World War I, the village was at the centre of fighting during the Battle of the Somme and was all but destroyed.

== Population ==
Historical population

Year	Pop.	±% p.a.
1793	440	—
1821	596	+1.09%
1846	682	+0.54%
1872	660	−0.13%
1901	502	−0.94%
1911	415	−1.89%
1921	233	−5.61%
1936	288	+1.42%
1946	323	+1.15%
1962	329	+0.12%

Year	Pop.	±% p.a.
1968	299	−1.58%
1975	358	+2.61%
1982	359	+0.04%
1990	446	+2.75%
1999	461	+0.37%
2007	465	+0.11%
2012	562	+3.86%
2017	640	+2.63%
2023	627	−0.34%

Source: EHESS and INSEE (1968–2023)

== See also ==
- Communes of the Somme department
