= Hermine Blangy =

19th century ballet dancer

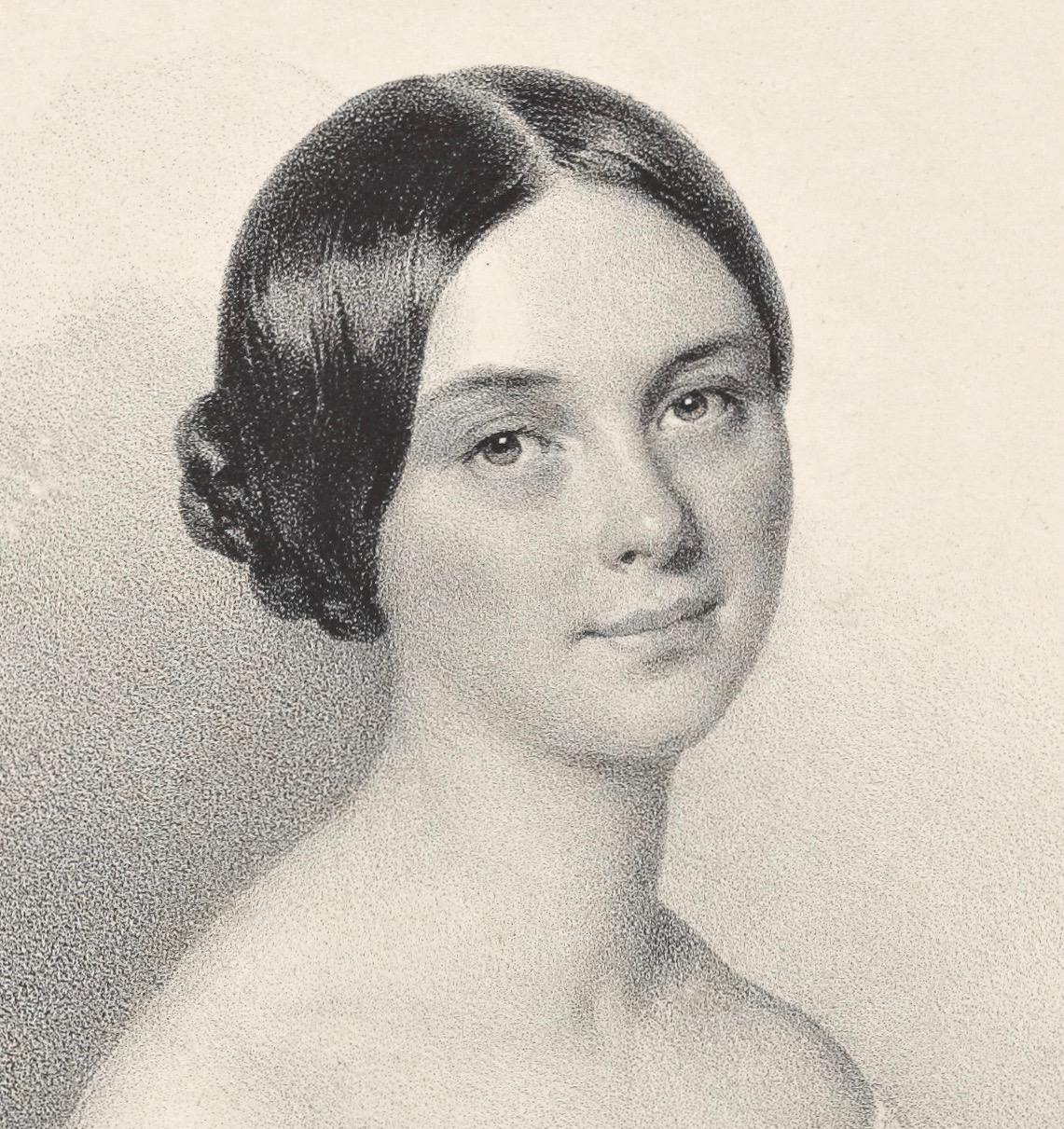
Hermine Blangy

Hermine Blangy (c. 1820–c. 1865 or before 1890) was a French Romantic ballet dancer in the Paris Opéra. She was also prima ballerina for the Hofoper in Vienna. Blangy was noted for her "intellectual" dancing, and in a tour of the USA, introduced American audiences to the Romantic roles of Giselle and La Sylphide.

== Life ==
Hermine Blangy was born between 1818 and 1820, probably in Paris. Between 1832 and 1841 she was contracted to the Paris Opéra, and in 1840 she danced the title role of La Sylphide there. She was also prima ballerina for the Hofoper in Vienna, and danced on tour in the USA, where she was considered to have introduced Romantic ballet to American audiences. Blangy's first appearance in America was at Niblo's Garden in July 1846, as Calista in Vengeance of Diana. Noah Miller Ludlow reports that "this artist gave unqualified satisfaction in all of her performances, and was unquestionably a fine pantomimist as well as dancer."

In 1847 Blangy's Giselle at the St. Charles Theater in New Orleans was so popular that she danced it ten times in a fortnight, to "crowded houses and enthusiastic applause". She also danced La Sylphide. Her last US performance of that tour was in New Orleans in 1847, as Helena in the Meyerbeer opera Robert le Diable, which "caused a great sensation", after which she left for Europe. Blangy returned to the US in 1849 to dance at The Broadway Theatre, and her last known performance was in 1851 in Charleston, South Carolina. Blangy was noted for her "intellectual" dancing.

She died around 1865, or at least before 1890.

Hermine Blangy in Giselle
