= Grattepanche =

- Commune
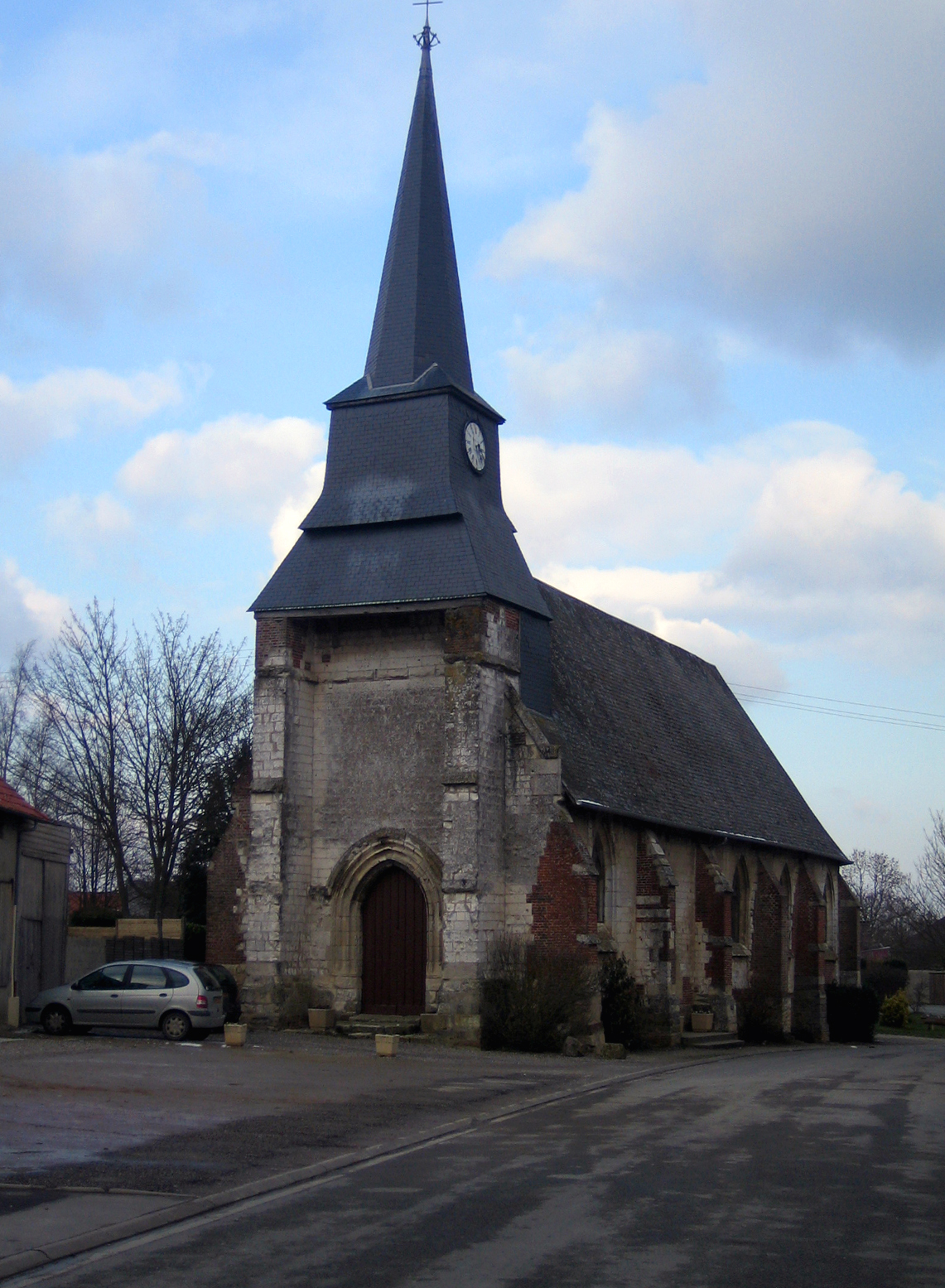
- The church in Grattepanche

- Coat of arms
- Location of Grattepanche
- Location within France Location within Hauts-de-France
- Coordinates: 49°47′17″N 2°17′41″E
- Country: France
- Region: Hauts-de-France
- Department: Somme
- Arrondissement: Amiens
- Canton: Ailly-sur-Noye
- Intercommunality: Amien Métropole

Government
  - Mayor (2020–2026): Bruno Bardet
- Area^{1}: 6.43 km^{2} (2.48 sq mi)
- Elevation: 100 m (330 ft)
- Highest elevation: 125 m (410 ft)
- Lowest elevation: 69 m (226 ft)
- Population (2023): 321
  - Density: 49.9/km^{2} (129/sq mi)
- Time zone: UTC+01:00 (CET)
  - Summer (DST): UTC+02:00 (CEST)
- INSEE/Postal code: 80387 /80680
- ^{1} French Land Register data, which excludes lakes, ponds, glaciers > 1 km^{2} (0.386 sq mi or 247 acres) and river estuaries.

Grattepanche (French pronunciation: [ɡʁatpɑ̃ʃ]) is a commune in the Somme department in Hauts-de-France in northern France.

== Geography ==
Grattepanche is situated on the D75e road, some 10 miles (16 km) south of Amiens.

== Population ==
Historical population
Year	Pop.	±% p.a.
1968	120	—
1975	148	+3.04%
1982	179	+2.75%
1990	243	+3.89%
1999	269	+1.14%
2007	287	+0.81%
2012	290	+0.21%
2017	318	+1.86%
2023	321	+0.16%
Source: INSEE

== Places of interest ==
- The church
- The war memorial
- The calvary

== See also ==
- Communes of the Somme department
