= Estrées-sur-Noye =

- Commune
- Location of Estrées-sur-Noye
- Location within France Location within Hauts-de-France
- Coordinates: 49°47′15″N 2°19′52″E
- Country: France
- Region: Hauts-de-France
- Department: Somme
- Arrondissement: Amiens
- Canton: Ailly-sur-Noye
- Intercommunality: Amiens Métropole

Government
  - Mayor (2020–2026): Alex Forestier
- Area^{1}: 5.96 km^{2} (2.30 sq mi)
- Elevation: 112 m (367 ft)
- Highest elevation: 126 m (413 ft)
- Lowest elevation: 79 m (259 ft)
- Population (2023): 287
  - Density: 48.2/km^{2} (125/sq mi)
- Time zone: UTC+01:00 (CET)
  - Summer (DST): UTC+02:00 (CEST)
- INSEE/Postal code: 80291 /80250
- ^{1} French Land Register data, which excludes lakes, ponds, glaciers > 1 km^{2} (0.386 sq mi or 247 acres) and river estuaries.

Estrées-sur-Noye (French pronunciation: [ɛstʁe syʁ nwa], literally Estrées on Noye) is a commune in the Somme department in Hauts-de-France in northern France.

== Geography ==
The commune is situated on the D7 road, near the banks of the river Noye, some 8 miles (13 km) south of Amiens. The Roman road, the Chaussée Brunehaut ran through the village and gives it its name (Estreti, which means village on the street or more precisely village on the road).

It is one of many villages in the north of France bearing the name Estrées. The etymology of the name is from strata (cognate of English "street"), the word for the stone-layered Roman roads in the area (some of which turned into modern highways). Hence Estreti, village on the road which developed into Estrées.

== Population ==
Historical population
Year	Pop.	±% p.a.
1968	162	—
1975	184	+1.84%
1982	195	+0.83%
1990	233	+2.25%
1999	255	+1.01%
2007	281	+1.22%
2012	282	+0.07%
2017	270	−0.87%
2023	287	+1.02%
Source: INSEE

== See also ==
- Communes of the Somme department
