= Sains-en-Amiénois =

- Commune
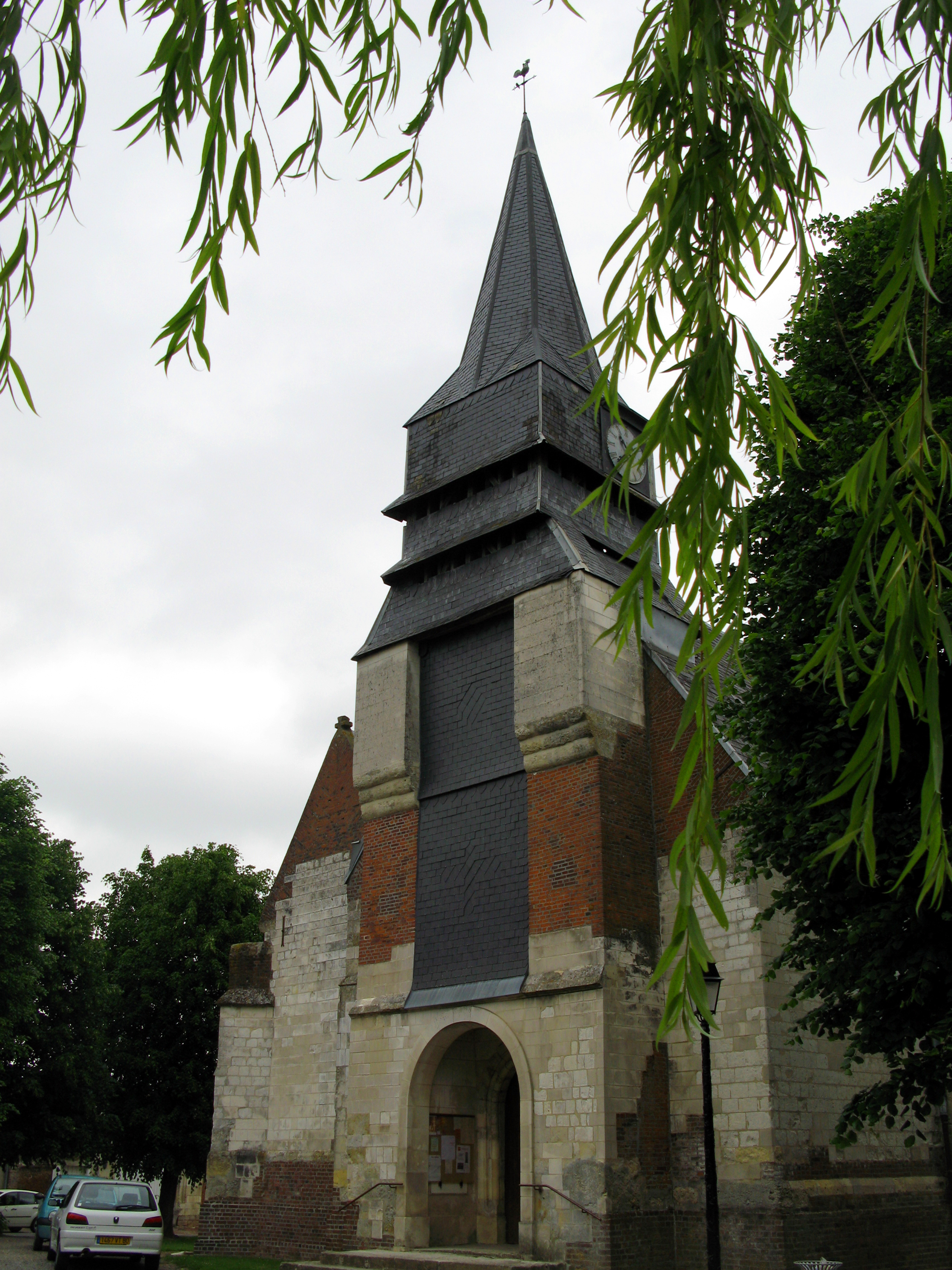
- The church tower

- Coat of arms
- Location of Sains-en-Amiénois
- Location within France Location within Hauts-de-France
- Coordinates: 49°49′04″N 2°19′08″E
- Country: France
- Region: Hauts-de-France
- Department: Somme
- Arrondissement: Amiens
- Canton: Amiens-6
- Intercommunality: Amiens Métropole

Government
  - Mayor (2020–2026): Pierre Lepoetre
- Area^{1}: 9.92 km^{2} (3.83 sq mi)
- Elevation: 112 m (367 ft)
- Highest elevation: 117 m (384 ft)
- Lowest elevation: 49 m (161 ft)
- Population (2023): 1,187
  - Density: 120/km^{2} (310/sq mi)
- Time zone: UTC+01:00 (CET)
  - Summer (DST): UTC+02:00 (CEST)
- INSEE/Postal code: 80696 /80680
- ^{1} French Land Register data, which excludes lakes, ponds, glaciers > 1 km^{2} (0.386 sq mi or 247 acres) and river estuaries.

Sains-en-Amiénois is a commune in the Somme department in Hauts-de-France in northern France.

== Geography ==
The commune is situated 6 miles (10 km) south of Amiens, on the D7 road. The population has increased two-fold in the last 30 years, as people of the region have left the land to work in or around Amiens.

== Population ==
Historical population
Year	Pop.	±% p.a.
1968	453	—
1975	605	+4.22%
1982	936	+6.43%
1990	1,054	+1.50%
1999	1,075	+0.22%
2007	1,219	+1.58%
2012	1,174	−0.75%
2017	1,205	+0.52%
2023	1,187	−0.25%
Source: INSEE

== Places of interest ==
- The 15th-century church, which is dedicated to three saints (Fuscien, Victoric and Gentien), whose joint tomb is a feature inside the building. Around 1900 the tower was topped with a spire. The church also houses a 12th-century font and sculptures from the 13th and 18th centuries, originally from the abbey at Selincourt, now a part of the commune of Hornoy-le-Bourg.
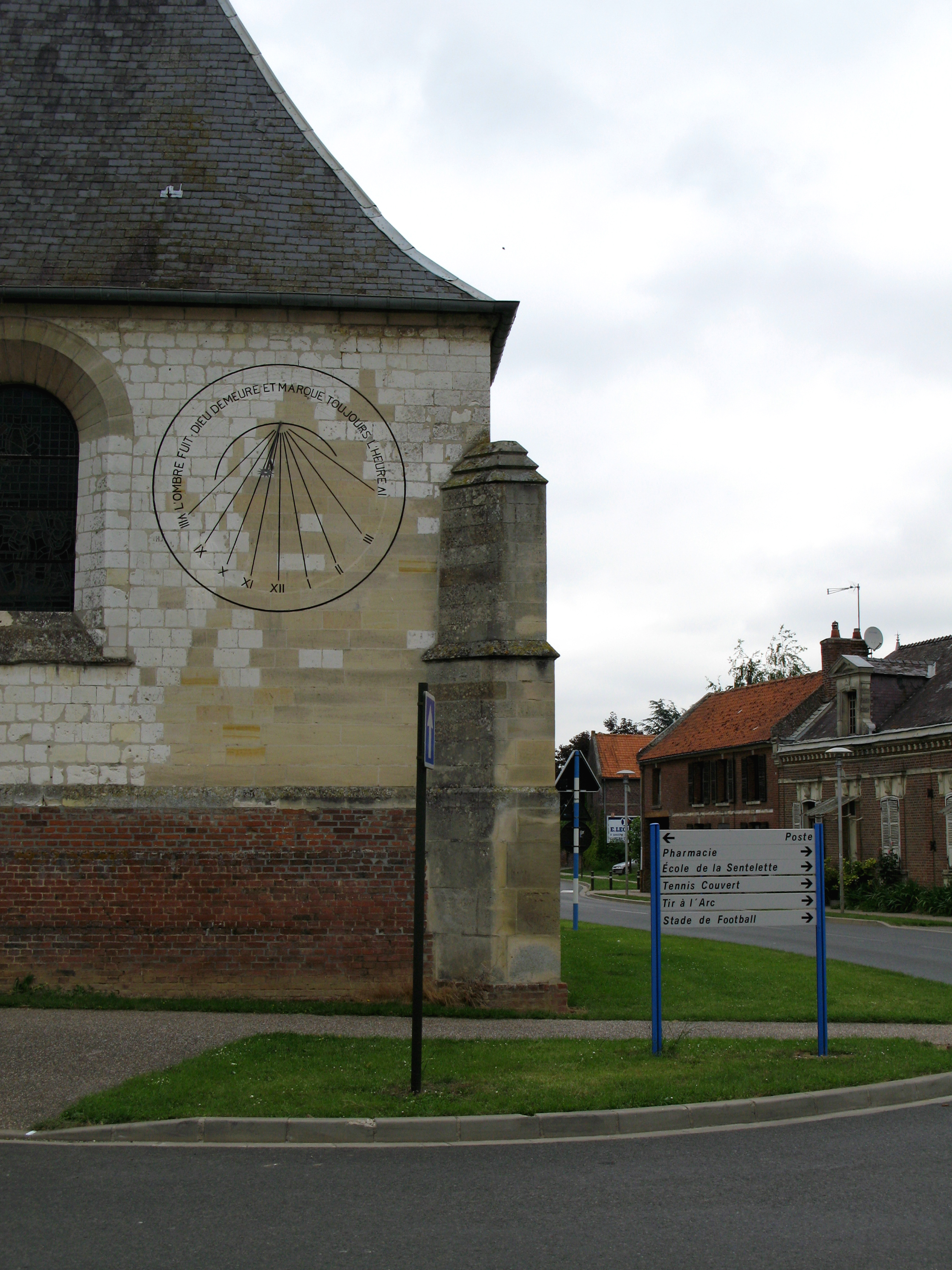
The sundial on the church

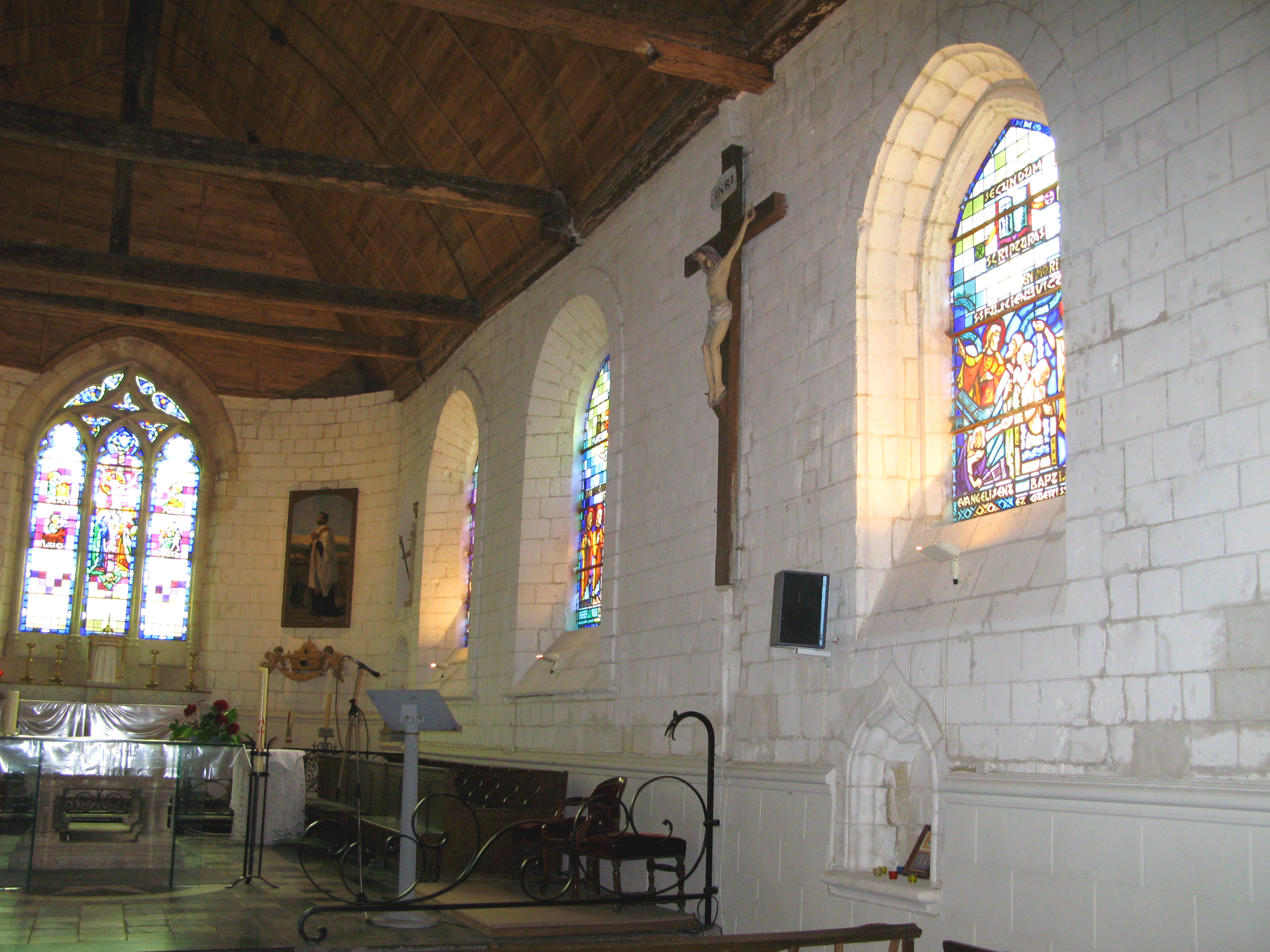
The interior of the church

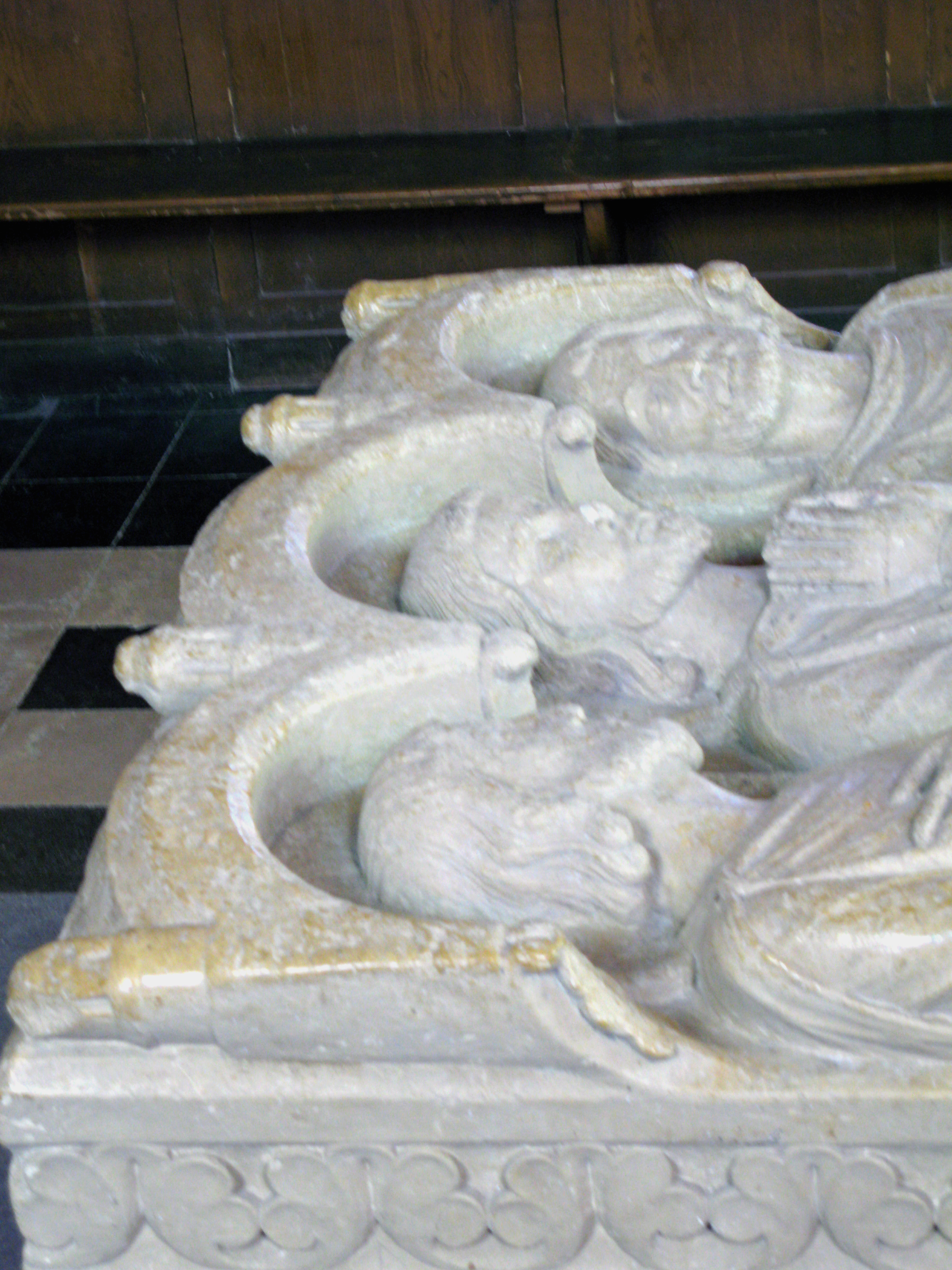
Tombstone of three Saints

== See also ==
- Communes of the Somme department
