= Saint-Sauflieu =

- Commune
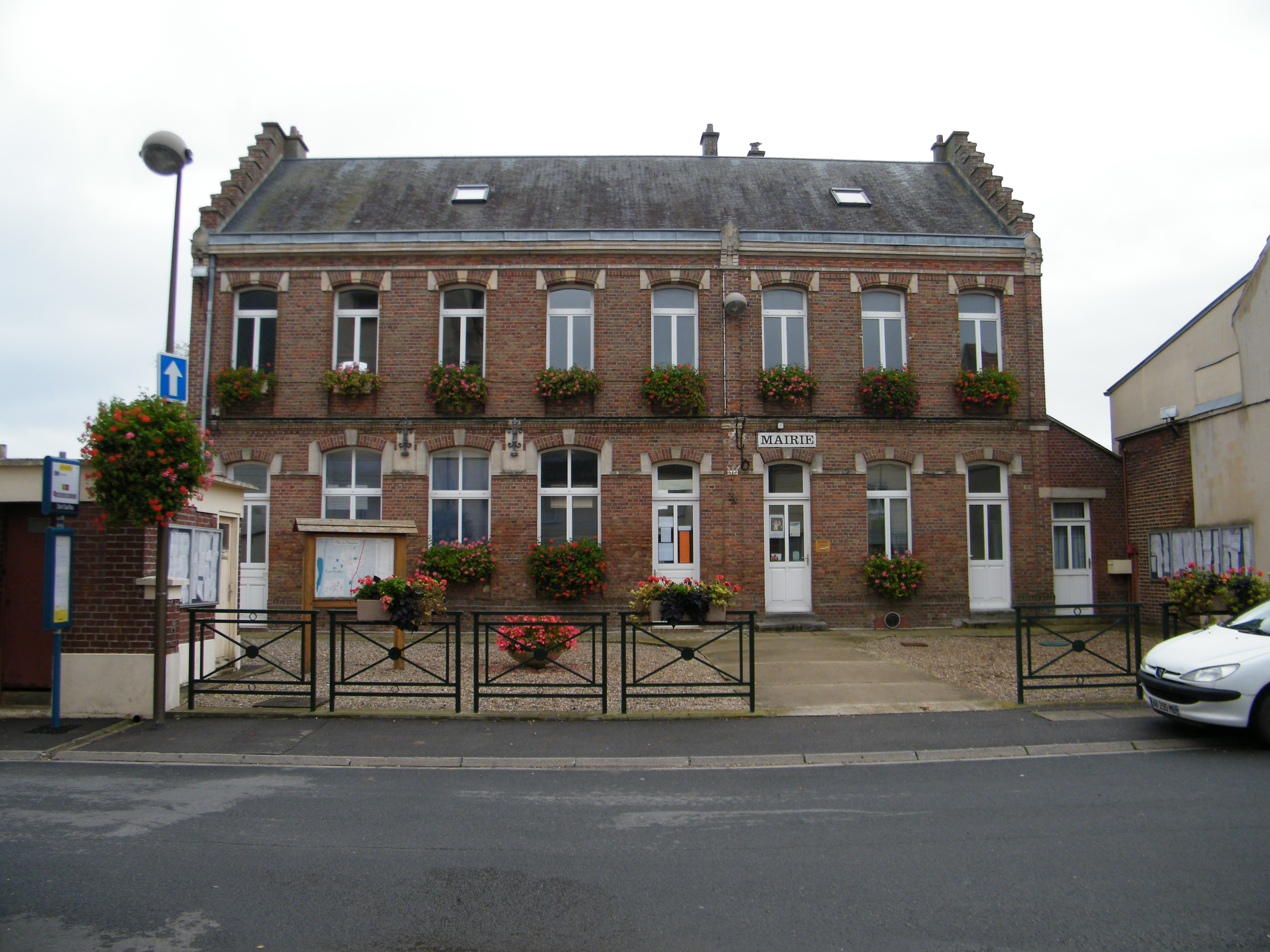
- The town hall in Saint-Sauflieu

- Coat of arms
- Location of Saint-Sauflieu
- Location within France Location within Hauts-de-France
- Coordinates: 49°47′24″N 2°15′14″E
- Country: France
- Region: Hauts-de-France
- Department: Somme
- Arrondissement: Amiens
- Canton: Ailly-sur-Noye
- Intercommunality: Amiens Métropole

Government
  - Mayor (2023–2026): Magali Contant
- Area^{1}: 7.76 km^{2} (3.00 sq mi)
- Elevation: 120 m (390 ft)
- Highest elevation: 137 m (449 ft)
- Lowest elevation: 79 m (259 ft)
- Population (2023): 976
  - Density: 126/km^{2} (326/sq mi)
- Time zone: UTC+01:00 (CET)
  - Summer (DST): UTC+02:00 (CEST)
- INSEE/Postal code: 80717 /80160
- ^{1} French Land Register data, which excludes lakes, ponds, glaciers > 1 km^{2} (0.386 sq mi or 247 acres) and river estuaries.

Saint-Sauflieu (French pronunciation: [sɛ̃ soflijø]; Picard: Saint-Souillu) is a commune in the Somme department in Hauts-de-France in northern France.

== Geography ==
The commune is situated 9 miles (14 km) south of Amiens, just off the N1 road. To the immediate west of the commune are the traces of the Chaussée Brunehaut, an ancient Roman road joining Caesaromagus (Beauvais) with Samarobriva (Amiens). More traces of Gallo-Roman construction have been found to the north of the village, by aerial observation.

== Population ==
Historical population

Year	Pop.	±% p.a.
1926	578	—
1931	544	−1.21%
1936	490	−2.07%
1946	454	−0.76%
1954	570	+2.89%
1962	623	+1.12%
1968	691	+1.74%
1975	770	+1.56%

Year	Pop.	±% p.a.
1982	787	+0.31%
1990	904	+1.75%
1999	901	−0.04%
2007	877	−0.34%
2012	971	+2.06%
2017	995	+0.49%
2023	976	−0.32%

Source: EHESS and INSEE

== See also ==
- Communes of the Somme department
