= Glisy =

- Commune
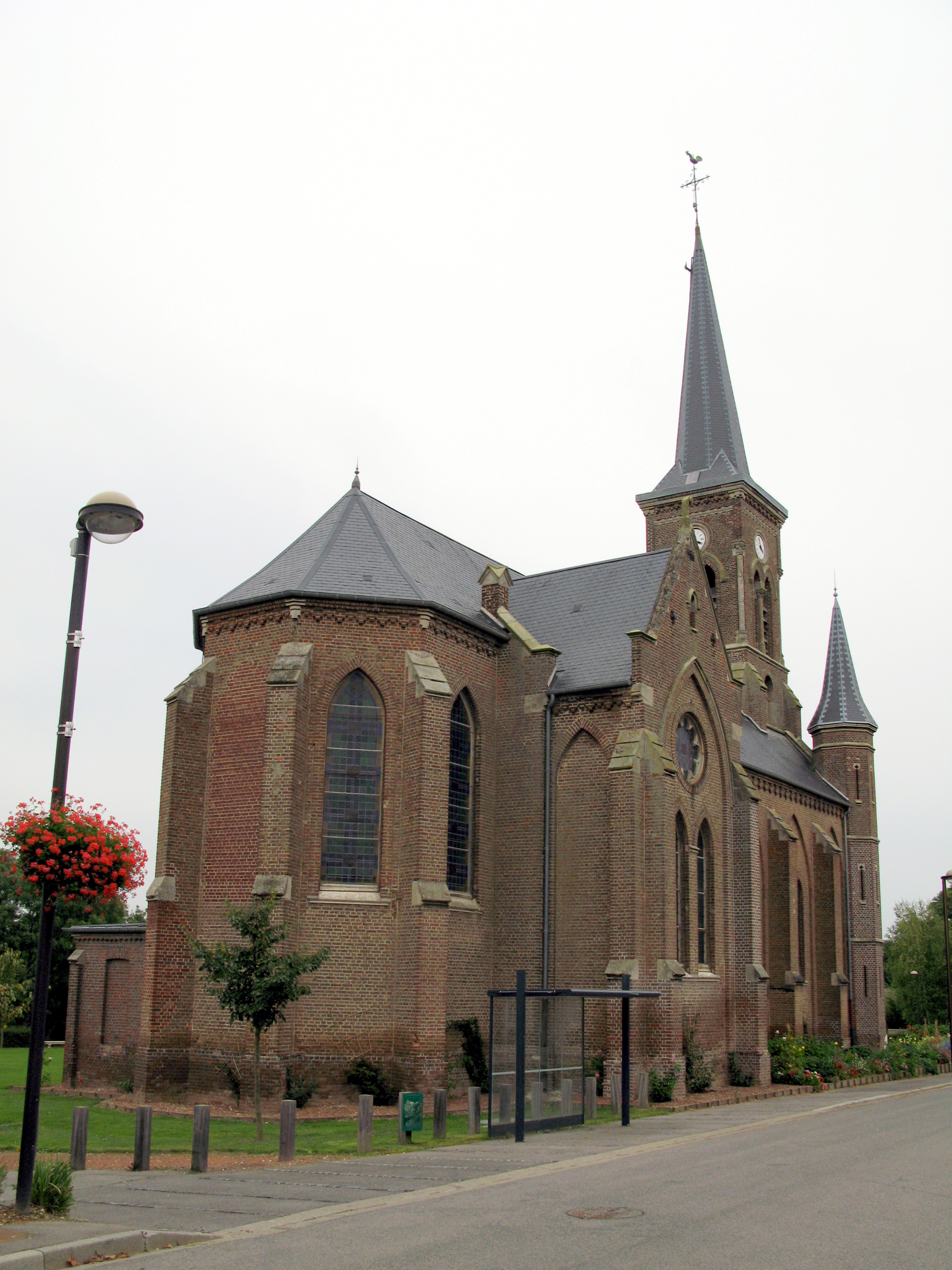
- The church in Glisy

- Coat of arms
- Location of Glisy
- Location within France Location within Hauts-de-France
- Coordinates: 49°52′42″N 2°23′57″E
- Country: France
- Region: Hauts-de-France
- Department: Somme
- Arrondissement: Amiens
- Canton: Amiens-4
- Intercommunality: Amiens Métropole

Government
  - Mayor (2020–2026): Guy Penaud
- Area^{1}: 5.55 km^{2} (2.14 sq mi)
- Elevation: 55 m (180 ft)
- Highest elevation: 70 m (230 ft)
- Lowest elevation: 21 m (69 ft)
- Population (2023): 791
  - Density: 143/km^{2} (369/sq mi)
- Time zone: UTC+01:00 (CET)
  - Summer (DST): UTC+02:00 (CEST)
- INSEE/Postal code: 80379 /80440
- ^{1} French Land Register data, which excludes lakes, ponds, glaciers > 1 km^{2} (0.386 sq mi or 247 acres) and river estuaries.

Glisy (French pronunciation: [ɡlizi]; Picard: Glisu) is a commune in the Somme department in Hauts-de-France in northern France.

== Geography ==
Glisy is situated 5 miles (8 km) east of Amiens on the D4029 road. Amiens airport is within the boundaries of the village. It was used as a military base by the occupying German forces between 1940 and 1944.

== Population ==
Historical population
Year	Pop.	±% p.a.
1968	370	—
1975	451	+2.87%
1982	532	+2.39%
1990	499	−0.80%
1999	483	−0.36%
2007	563	+1.93%
2012	619	+1.91%
2017	771	+4.49%
2023	791	+0.43%
Source: INSEE

== See also ==
- Communes of the Somme department
