= Saint-Fuscien =

- Commune
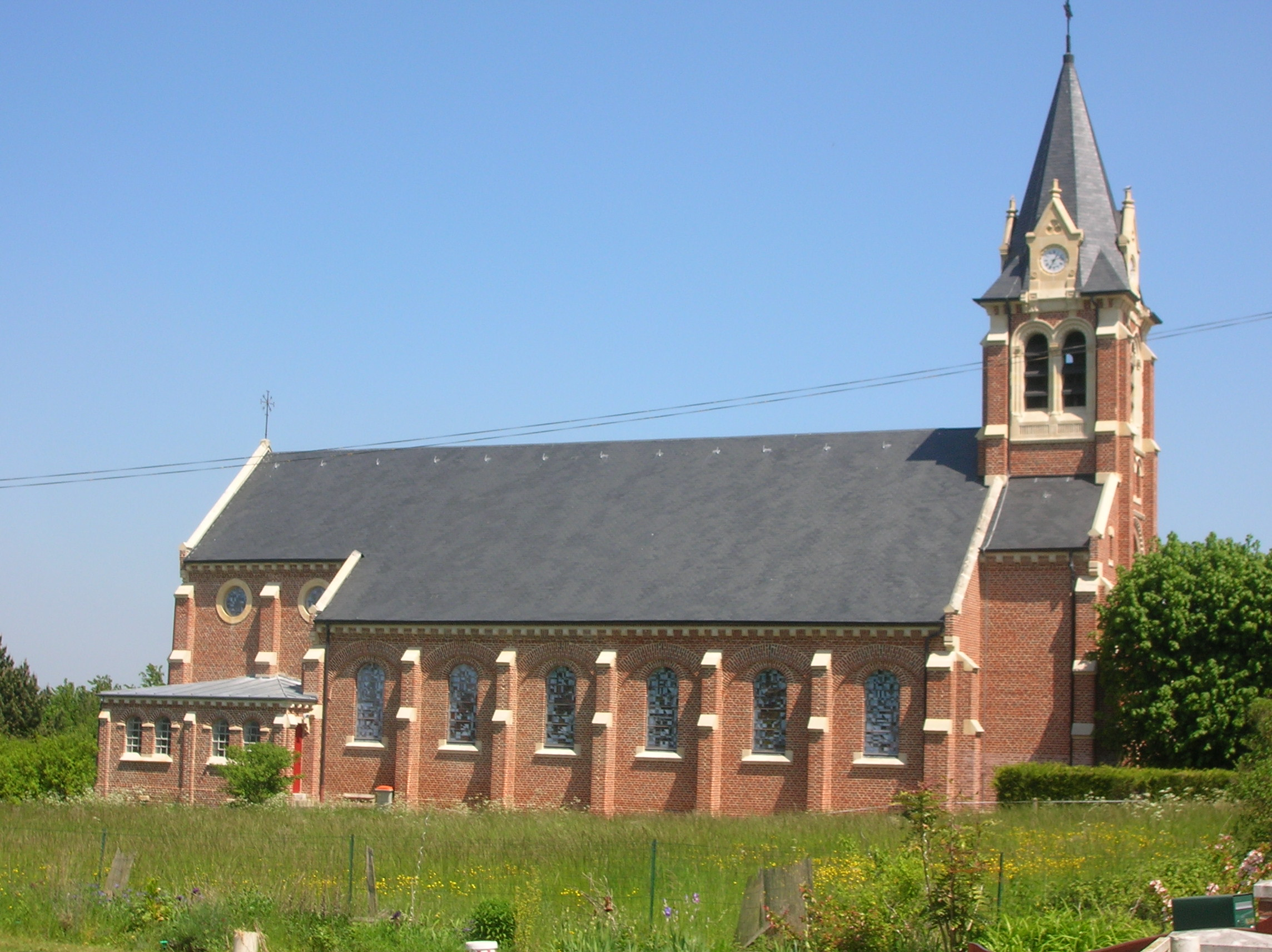
- The church in 2010

- Coat of arms
- Location of Saint-Fuscien
- Location within France Location within Hauts-de-France
- Coordinates: 49°50′18″N 2°18′56″E
- Country: France
- Region: Hauts-de-France
- Department: Somme
- Arrondissement: Amiens
- Canton: Amiens-6
- Intercommunality: Amiens Métropole

Government
  - Mayor (2020–2026): Henri-Paul Fin
- Area^{1}: 9.92 km^{2} (3.83 sq mi)
- Elevation: 108 m (354 ft)
- Highest elevation: 113 m (371 ft)
- Lowest elevation: 38 m (125 ft)
- Population (2023): 1,409
  - Density: 142/km^{2} (368/sq mi)
- Time zone: UTC+01:00 (CET)
  - Summer (DST): UTC+02:00 (CEST)
- INSEE/Postal code: 80702 /80680
- ^{1} French Land Register data, which excludes lakes, ponds, glaciers > 1 km^{2} (0.386 sq mi or 247 acres) and river estuaries.

Saint-Fuscien (French pronunciation: [sɛ̃ fysjɛ̃]; Picard: Saint-Fuschien) is a commune in the Somme department in Hauts-de-France in northern France.
The name of the commune in Picard is Saint-Fuschien.

== Geography ==
The commune is situated some 5 km (3 mi) south of Amiens, on the D7 road.

== History ==
The commune's name is derived from Saint Fuscian (Fuscien, Fulcian) (3rd century), who is said to have been buried in the area, along with Saints Gentian and Victoricus (Victorice).

== Population ==
Historical population
| Year | Pop. | ±% p.a. |
|---|---|---|
| 1968 | 431 | — |
| 1975 | 687 | +6.89% |
| 1982 | 1,026 | +5.90% |
| 1990 | 1,031 | +0.06% |
| 1999 | 966 | −0.72% |
| 2007 | 896 | −0.94% |
| 2012 | 962 | +1.43% |
| 2017 | 1,170 | +3.99% |
| 2023 | 1,409 | +3.15% |
Source: INSEE

== Places of interest ==
- The 19th century church was burnt down by arsonists in 2005. After restoration, it was reopened in 2008.

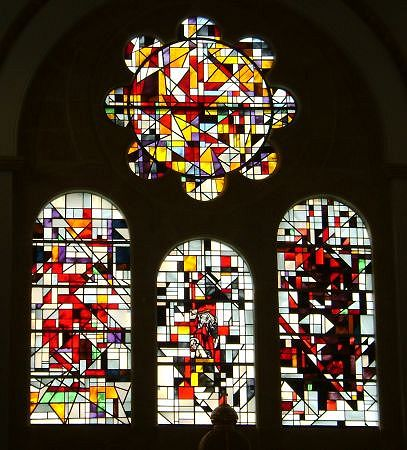
Stained glass by Alain Mongrenier

- Of the former Saint-Fuscien abbey, only the abbot's residence has been preserved.

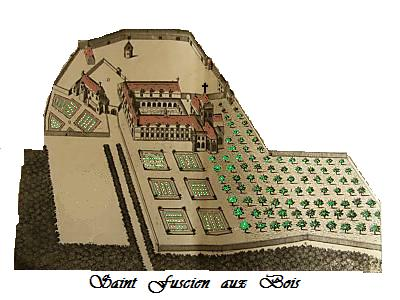
Abbey of Saint-Fuscien from Monasticon Gallicanum

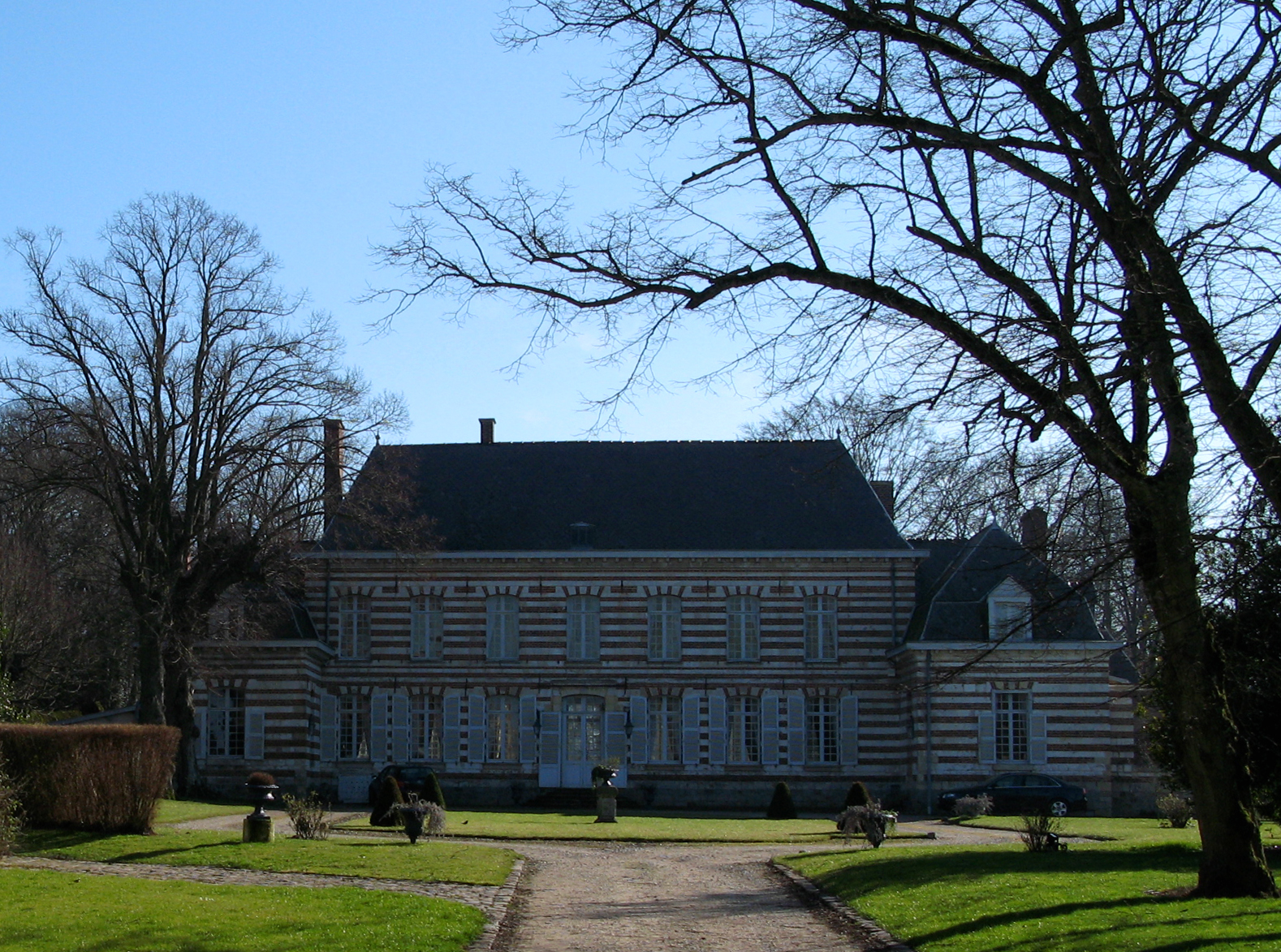
logis abbatial (18th century)

== Coat of arms (Blason) ==
| Image | |
|---|---|
| | Saint-Fuscien D'azur aux troés keuvrons d'érgint aveuc troés étoéles d'or. |

== See also ==
- Communes of the Somme department
