= Dury, Somme =

Dury
- Commune
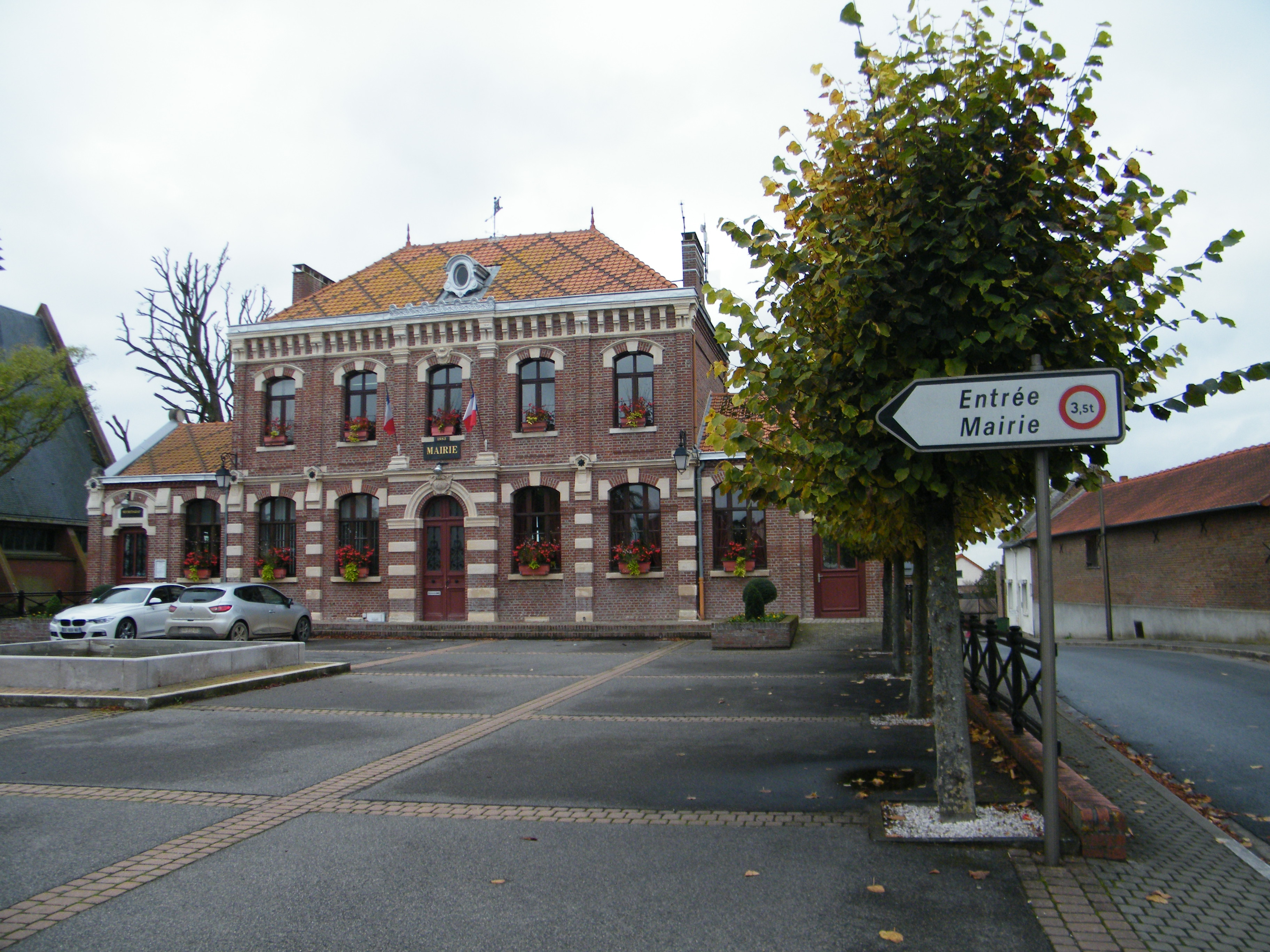
- The town hall in Dury

- Coat of arms
- Location of Dury
- Location within France Location within Hauts-de-France
- Coordinates: 49°50′46″N 2°16′14″E
- Country: France
- Region: Hauts-de-France
- Department: Somme
- Arrondissement: Amiens
- Canton: Amiens-6
- Intercommunality: Amiens Métropole

Government
  - Mayor (2020–2026): Anne Pinon
- Area^{1}: 10.99 km^{2} (4.24 sq mi)
- Elevation: 114 m (374 ft)
- Highest elevation: 117 m (384 ft)
- Lowest elevation: 59 m (194 ft)
- Population (2023): 1,441
  - Density: 131.1/km^{2} (339.6/sq mi)
- Time zone: UTC+01:00 (CET)
  - Summer (DST): UTC+02:00 (CEST)
- INSEE/Postal code: 80261 /80480
- ^{1} French Land Register data, which excludes lakes, ponds, glaciers > 1 km^{2} (0.386 sq mi or 247 acres) and river estuaries.

Dury (French pronunciation: [dyʁi]) is a commune in the Somme department in Hauts-de-France in northern France.

== Geography ==
Dury is situated on the N1 road, some 4 miles (6 km) south of Amiens town centre.

== Population ==
Historical population
Year	Pop.	±% p.a.
1968	1,694	—
1975	1,698	+0.03%
1982	1,561	−1.19%
1990	1,341	−1.88%
1999	1,141	−1.78%
2007	1,248	+1.13%
2012	1,222	−0.42%
2017	1,430	+3.19%
2023	1,441	+0.13%
Source: INSEE

== See also ==
- Communes of the Somme department
