= Hébécourt, Somme =

Hébécourt
- Commune
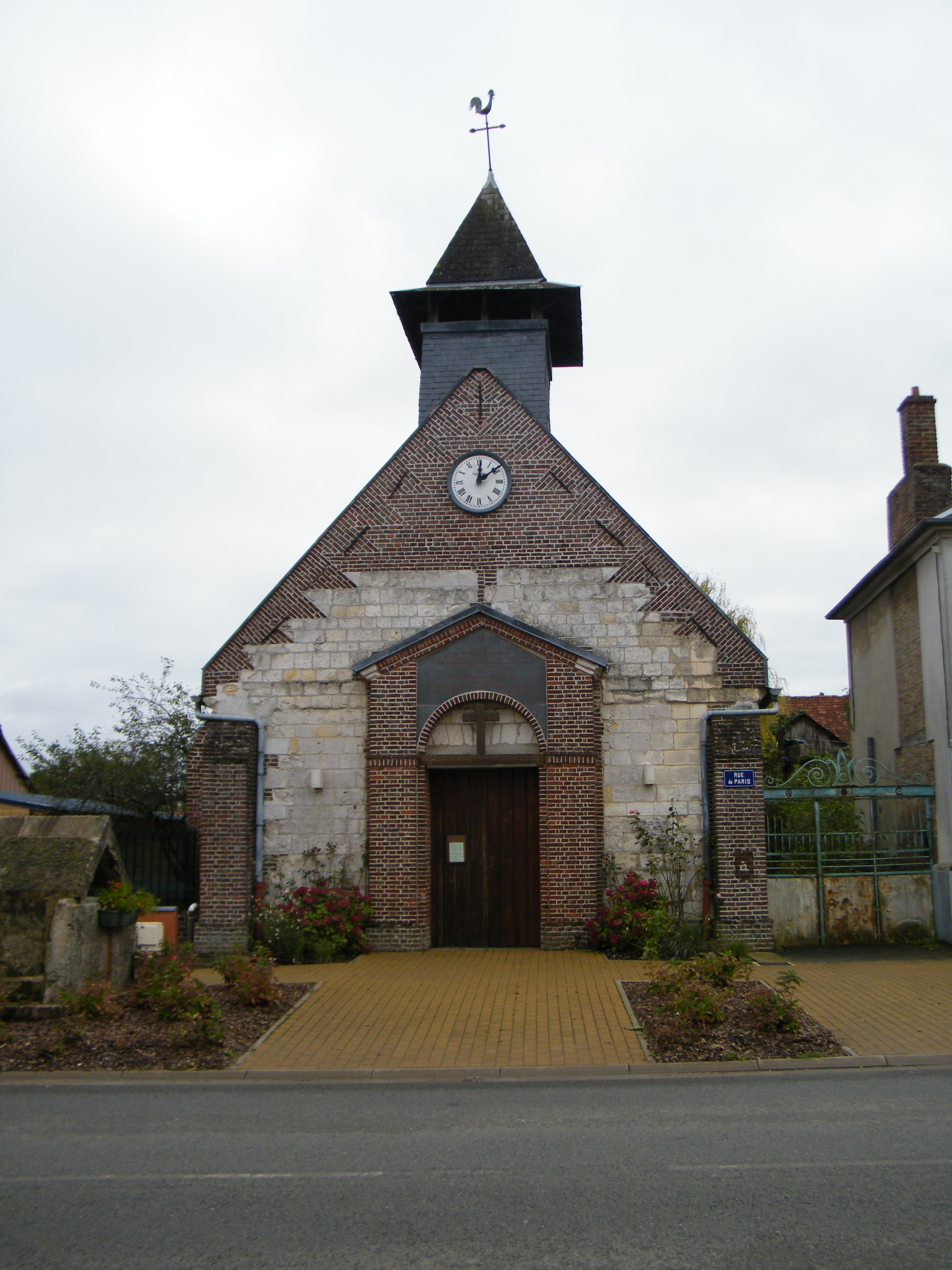
- The church in Hébécourt
- Location of Hébécourt
- Location within France Location within Hauts-de-France
- Coordinates: 49°48′50″N 2°15′43″E
- Country: France
- Region: Hauts-de-France
- Department: Somme
- Arrondissement: Amiens
- Canton: Amiens-6
- Intercommunality: Amiens Métropole

Government
  - Mayor (2020–2026): Dominique Hesdin
- Area^{1}: 5.04 km^{2} (1.95 sq mi)
- Elevation: 120 m (390 ft)
- Highest elevation: 124 m (407 ft)
- Lowest elevation: 65 m (213 ft)
- Population (2023): 576
  - Density: 114/km^{2} (296/sq mi)
- Time zone: UTC+01:00 (CET)
  - Summer (DST): UTC+02:00 (CEST)
- INSEE/Postal code: 80424 /80680
- ^{1} French Land Register data, which excludes lakes, ponds, glaciers > 1 km^{2} (0.386 sq mi or 247 acres) and river estuaries.

Hébécourt (French pronunciation: [ebekuʁ]) is a commune in the Somme department in Hauts-de-France in northern France.

== Geography ==
The commune is situated on the N1 road, 10 kilometres (6 mi) south of Amiens.

== Population ==
Historical population
Year	Pop.	±% p.a.
1968	170	—
1975	223	+3.95%
1982	369	+7.46%
1990	388	+0.63%
1999	371	−0.50%
2007	492	+3.59%
2012	521	+1.15%
2017	538	+0.64%
2023	576	+1.14%
Source: INSEE

== See also ==
- Communes of the Somme department
