= Rumigny, Somme =

Rumigny
- Commune
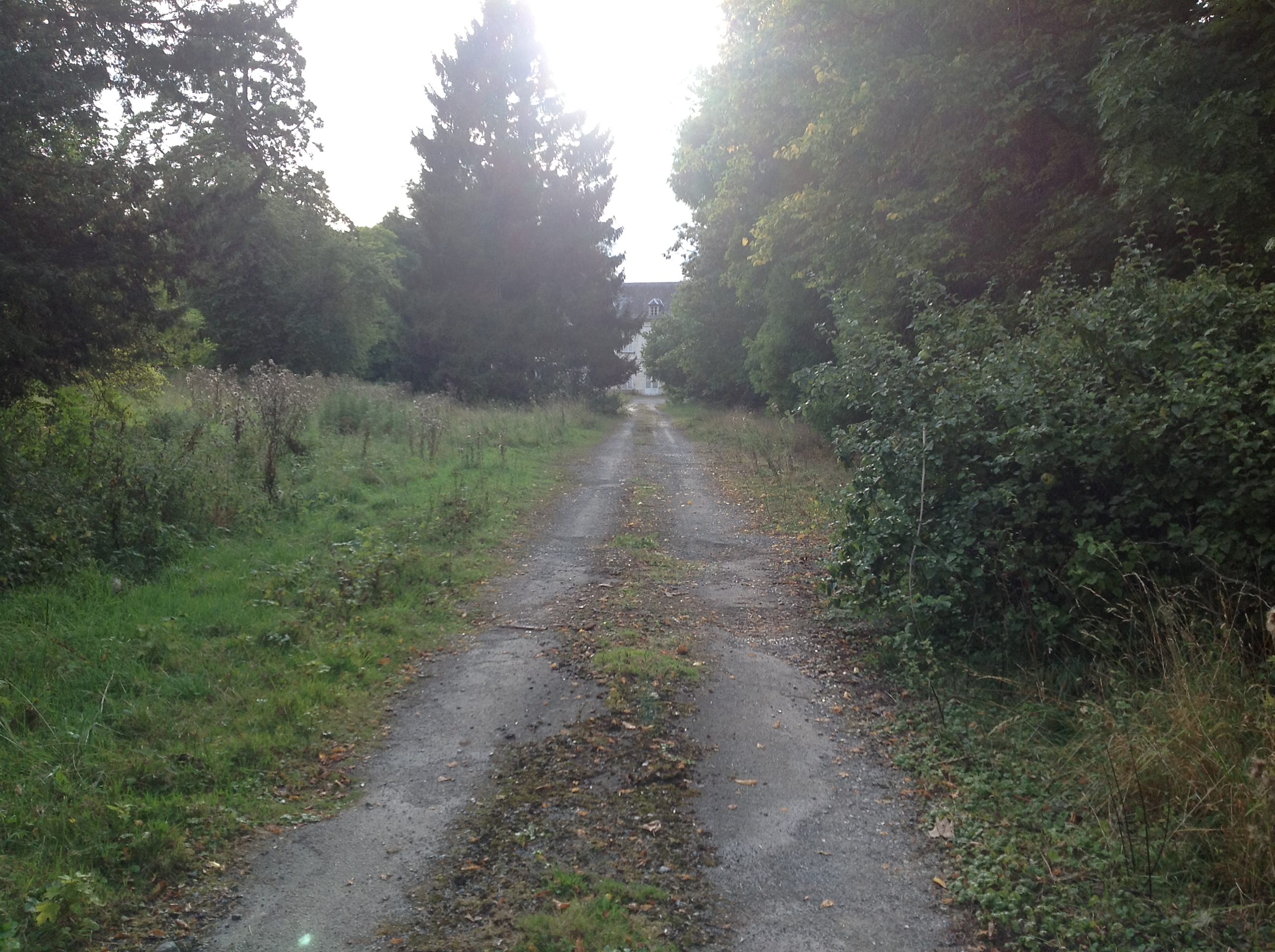
- Rumigny manor
- Location of Rumigny
- Location within France Location within Hauts-de-France
- Coordinates: 49°48′29″N 2°16′50″E
- Country: France
- Region: Hauts-de-France
- Department: Somme
- Arrondissement: Amiens
- Canton: Amiens-6
- Intercommunality: Amiens Métropole

Government
  - Mayor (2020–2026): Dominique Evrard
- Area^{1}: 7.83 km^{2} (3.02 sq mi)
- Elevation: 115 m (377 ft)
- Highest elevation: 125 m (410 ft)
- Lowest elevation: 79 m (259 ft)
- Population (2023): 613
  - Density: 78.3/km^{2} (203/sq mi)
- Time zone: UTC+01:00 (CET)
  - Summer (DST): UTC+02:00 (CEST)
- INSEE/Postal code: 80690 /80680
- ^{1} French Land Register data, which excludes lakes, ponds, glaciers > 1 km^{2} (0.386 sq mi or 247 acres) and river estuaries.

Rumigny (French pronunciation: [ʁymiɲi]) is a commune in the Somme department in Hauts-de-France in northern France.

== Geography ==
Rumigny is situated some 6 miles (10 km) south of Amiens, on the D75 road.

The manor house, Chateau de Rumigny, is set in woodland to the west of the village centre.

== Population ==
Historical population
Year	Pop.	±% p.a.
1968	332	—
1975	424	+3.56%
1982	476	+1.67%
1990	529	+1.33%
1999	567	+0.77%
2007	580	+0.28%
2012	559	−0.73%
2017	611	+1.79%
2023	613	+0.05%
Source: INSEE

== See also ==
- Communes of the Somme department
