= Blangy-Tronville =

- Commune
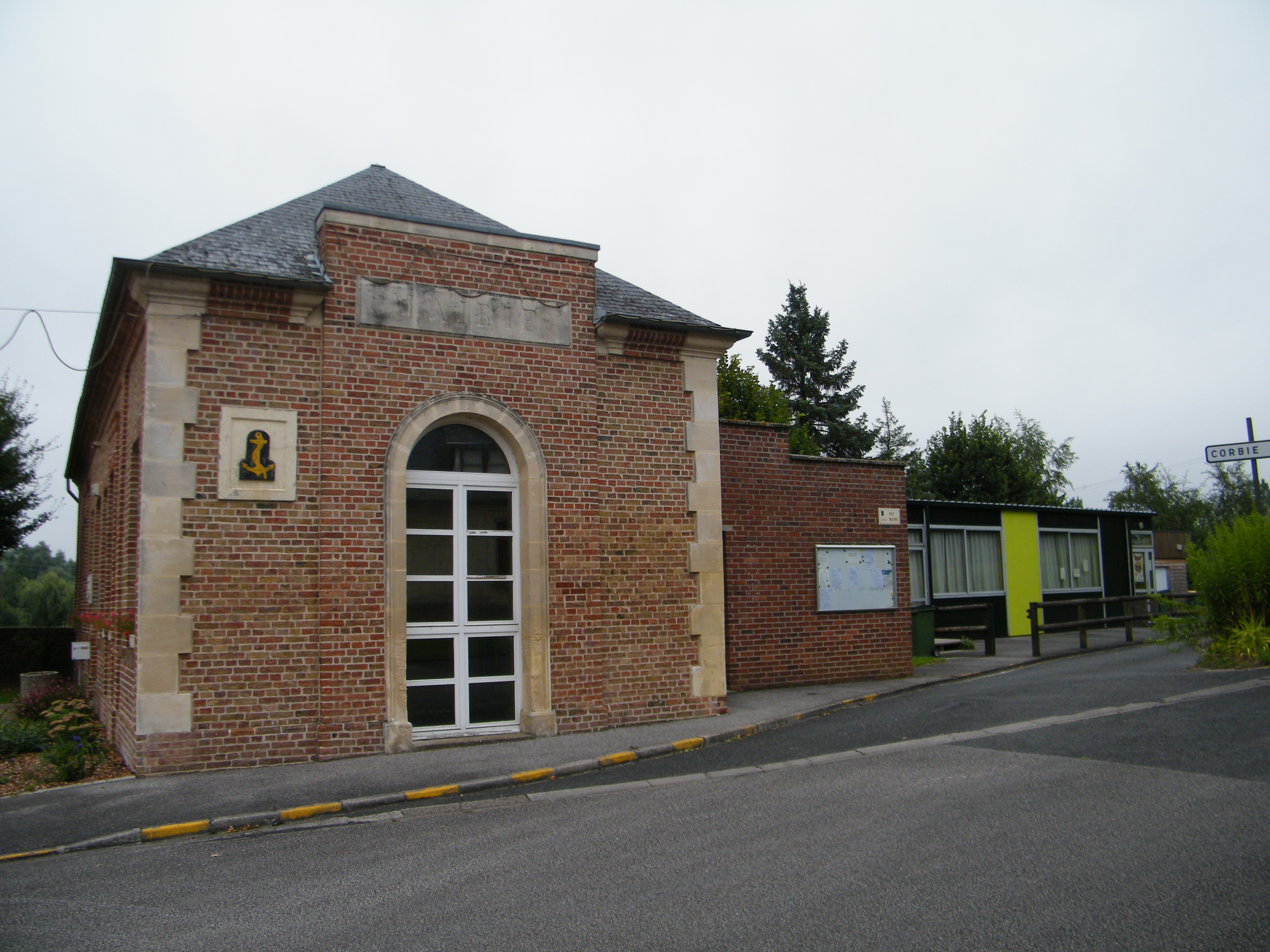
- The town hall in Blangy-Tronville
- Location of Blangy-Tronville
- Location within France Location within Hauts-de-France
- Coordinates: 49°52′50″N 2°25′28″E
- Country: France
- Region: Hauts-de-France
- Department: Somme
- Arrondissement: Amiens
- Canton: Amiens-4
- Intercommunality: Amiens Métropole

Government
  - Mayor (2020–2026): Eric Gueant
- Area^{1}: 12.44 km^{2} (4.80 sq mi)
- Elevation: 50 m (160 ft)
- Highest elevation: 117 m (384 ft)
- Lowest elevation: 22 m (72 ft)
- Population (2023): 613
  - Density: 49.3/km^{2} (128/sq mi)
- Time zone: UTC+01:00 (CET)
  - Summer (DST): UTC+02:00 (CEST)
- INSEE/Postal code: 80107 /80440
- ^{1} French Land Register data, which excludes lakes, ponds, glaciers > 1 km^{2} (0.386 sq mi or 247 acres) and river estuaries.

Blangy-Tronville (French pronunciation: [blɑ̃ʒi tʁɔ̃vil]; Picard: Blangin-Tronville) is a commune in the Somme department in Hauts-de-France in northern France.

== Geography ==
The communes is situated on the banks of the Somme, 3 miles (5 km) east of Amiens on the D267 road.

== Population ==
Historical population
Year	Pop.	±% p.a.
1968	320	—
1975	335	+0.66%
1982	490	+5.58%
1990	565	+1.80%
1999	553	−0.24%
2007	529	−0.55%
2012	553	+0.89%
2017	563	+0.36%
2023	613	+1.43%
Source: INSEE

== See also ==
- Communes of the Somme department
