= 4th Colonial Infantry Division (France) =

French WWII military unit

- Country: France
- Branch: (France) French Army
- Type: Division
- Engagements: World War II: Battle of France

The 4th Colonial Infantry Division (4e Division d’Infanterie Coloniale, 4e DIC) was a unit of the French Army which saw combat in the Battle of France during World War II. It played a major part in fighting along the Somme River but was ultimately largely destroyed during the German Fall Rot operation in June 1940.

== Command and Composition ==
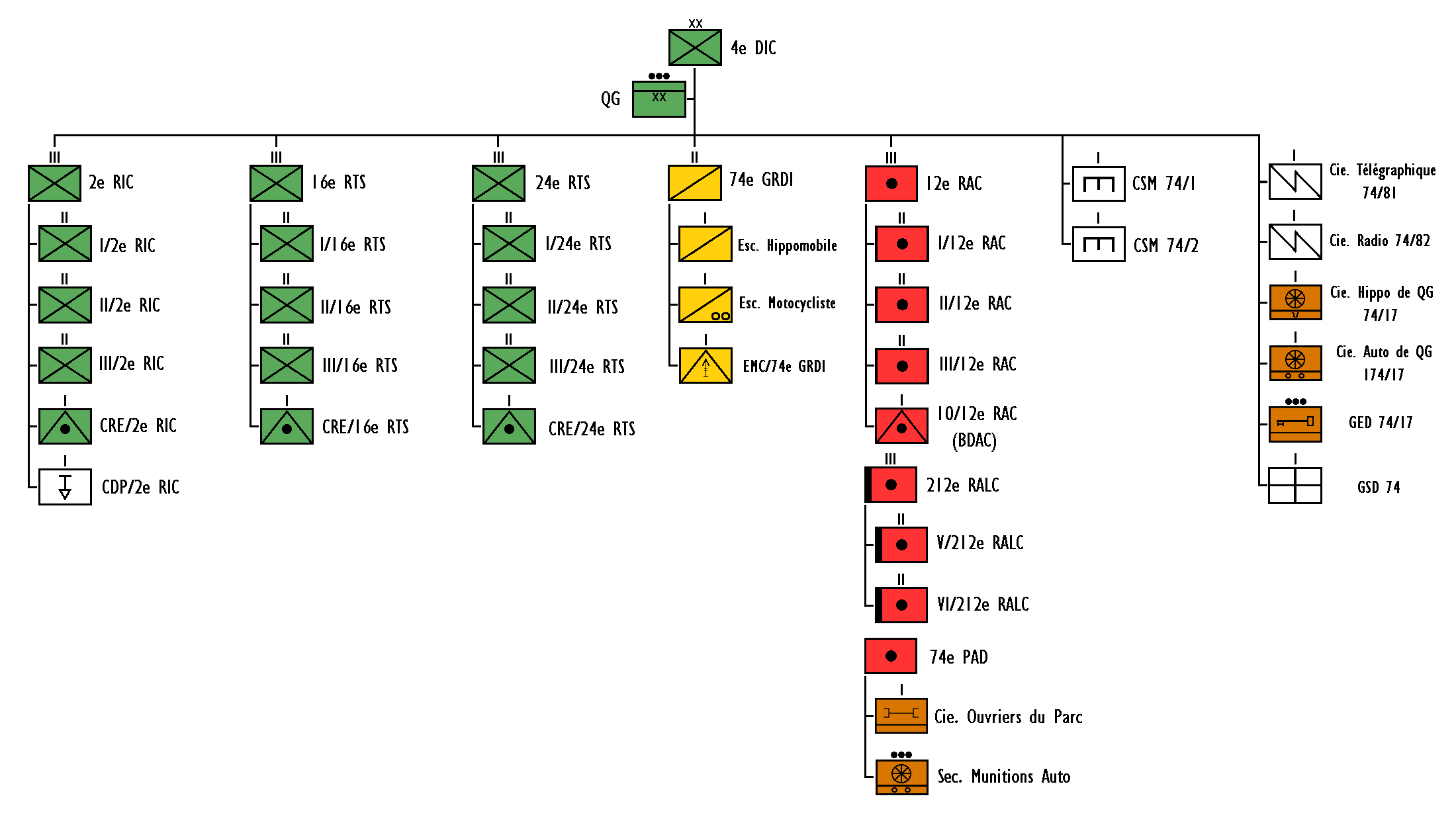
An organizational diagram depicting the composition of the 4e DIC on 10 May 1940.

In May 1940 the division was led by Général de division Maurice Bazelaire de Ruppierre and consisted of the following elements:

- 2nd Colonial Infantry Regiment (2e Regiment d’Infanterie Coloniale, 2e RIC)
  - Including Divisional Pioneer Company (Compagnie Divisionnaire de Pioniers, CDP)
- 16th Senegalese Tirailleurs Regiment (16e Regiment de Tirailleurs Senegalais, 16e RTS)
- 24th Senegalese Tirailleurs Regiment (24e Regiment de Tirailleurs Senegalais, 24e RTS)
- 74th Divisional Reconnaissance Group (74e Groupe de Reconnaissance de Division d'Infanterie, 74e GRDI)
- 12th Colonial Artillery Regiment (12e Régiment d'Artillerie Coloniale, 12e RAC)
  - Including Divisional Anti-Tank Battery (Batterie Divisionnaire Anti-Chars, BDAC)
- 212th Colonial Heavy Artillery Regiment (212e Régiment d'Artillerie Lourde Coloniale, 212e RALC)
- Engineer Companies 74/1 and 74/2 (Compagnie de Sapeurs-Mineurs 74/1 & 74/2, CSM 74/1 & 74/2)
- 74th Divisional Artillery Park (74e Parc d'Artillerie Divisionnaire, 74e PAD)
  - Including one Artillery Park Labor Company (Compagnie d'Ouvriers de Parc) and one Motorized Munitions Section (Section de Munitions Automobile)
- Telegraph Company 74/81 (Compagnie Télégraphique 74/81)
- Radio Company 74/82 (Compagnie Radiotélégraphique 74/82)
- Horse-drawn Headquarters Transport Company 74/17 (Compagnie Hippomobile de QG 74/17)
- Motorized Headquarters Transport Company 174/17 (Compagnie Automobile de QG 174/17)
- Divisional Quartermaster Group 74/17 (Groupe d'Exploitation Divisionnaire 74/17)
- Divisional Medical Group 74 (Groupe Sanitaire Divisionnaire 74)

== History ==
Deployed in Alsace at the outbreak of the war in September 1939, the 4e DIC participated in the Sarre Offensive, and then held multiple points along the Maginot Line during the so-called Phoney War. On 12 September the 2e RIC occupied the German village of Schweix. During the winter of 1939-40 the two Senegalese tirailleur regiments were sent to the south of France, as the African troops were considered unsuitable for the difficult winter conditions in the east of the country. They returned to the division in early April 1940. In the spring of 1940 the division was in reserve near Sarrebourg. The unit was considered to be fairly well-trained and well-disciplined, but had not received its full complement of anti-tank and anti-air weaponry.

On 17 May the 4e DIC was transferred by rail to the region of Amiens on the Somme where it was attached to General Théodore Marcel Sciard's 1st Corps, part of the 7th Army under General Aubert Frère, in order to contain the German breakthrough after the Battle of Sedan. During transit the unit lost 30 officers and 200 men to German air attacks. Amiens fell to the Germans on 20 May. The same day the divisional reconnaissance group made contact with the Germans near the village of Corbie, east of the city. In the face of enemy armor the 74e GRDI was forced to withdraw before all bridges over the Somme in this area could be destroyed.

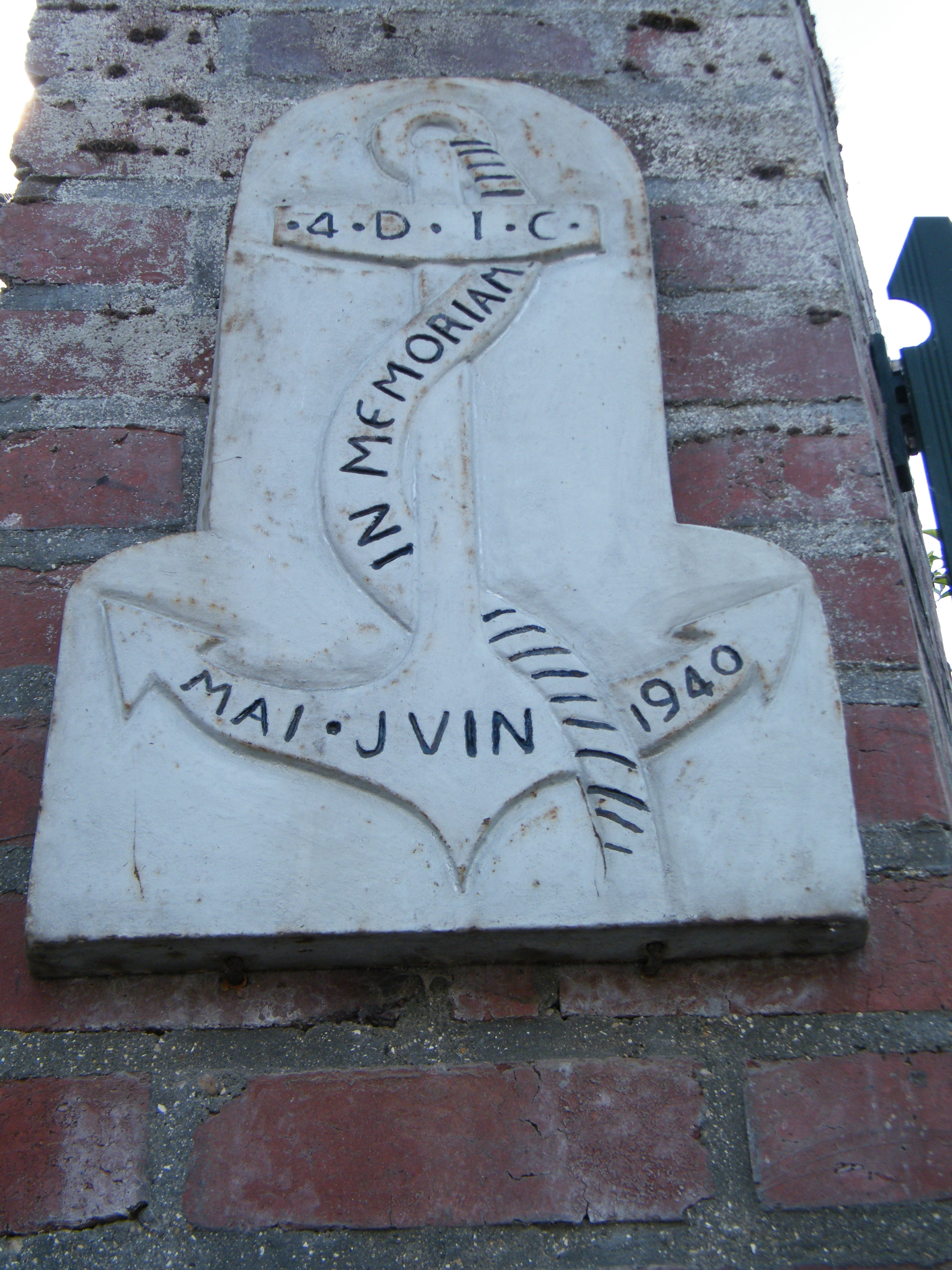
Memorial to the 4e DIC at the entrance to the cemetery in Aubigny.

On 23 May the German 2. Infanterie-Division (mot.) seized bridgeheads over the Somme at Aubigny and Fouilloy, 15 km east of Amiens. The 4e DIC launched counterattacks the same day, with orders to push the Germans back and establish its own bridgehead at Corbie to permit a counteroffensive towards the north. The 24e RTS managed to retake Aubigny at the cost of 254 men from the first battalion, while the 16e RTS was repulsed during its attack of Fouilloy, losing 150 men from the third battalion. The next day the German 13th Infantry Division recaptured Aubigny, executing 50 wounded tirailleurs of the 24e RTS in the process. The 16e and 24e RTS, reinforced by 12 Renault R35 tanks from the 40e Bataillon de Chars de Combat (40e BCC), launched a final attack on Aubigny and Fouilloy at 7 pm on May 28. Once again the attack on Fouilloy was repulsed, while the Germans launched immediate counterattacks in the Aubigny area, obliging the 24e RTS to withdraw around 2 am on May 29.

After 28 May the division moved to a defensive posture. The 16e RTS held the right flank between Le Hamel and Villers-Bretonneux in the center the 24e RTS was responsible for the sector extending from Villers-Bretonneux to Blagny-Tronville, and on the left flank the 2e RIC defended the junction of the Somme and Noye rivers, holding the towns of Longueau and Boves. To the west the 7e DIC was positioned south of Amiens, with the 57e RICMS in liaison with the 2e RIC at Cagny. To the east the 7e DINA held positions along the Somme. The 4e DIC thus held a front of roughly 20 km. On 30 May the 16e Division d’Infanterie relieved the 7e DIC on the left flank.

On 5 June the Germans launched Case Red, an operation aimed at capturing Paris, and began a major assault against the Weygand Line. The 16e Division, positioned on the left flank of the 4e DIC, came under heavy attack from the German XV motorized corps, which quickly achieved a penetration 15 km deep between Dury and Cagny. The shattered remnants of the 89e RI of the 16e Division regrouped in the 2e RIC sector and cooperated in the defense of Longueau. German attacks in the Villers-Bretonneux area against the positions of the 24e RTS were repulsed, with the French artillery inflicting considerable casualties. On 6 June German progress against the 16e DI continued, with panzers reaching as far south as Esserteaux. Probing attacks were launched against the 2e RIC at Boves. Though the 4e DIC had held its positions the left flank of the division was now under serious threat.

During the night of 6 June, the 4e DIC fell back to southwest, establishing a new position between Ailly-sur-Noye and Braches. During the night the 2nd battalion of the 2e RIC was largely annihilated while fighting a rearguard action at Remiencourt, with only about 100 men escaping enemy encirclement. On 7 June the division managed to hold Ailly against German attack, but enemy progress continued on the left flank. On 8 June the third battalion of the 24e RTS came under heavy attack near Merville-au-Bois but managed to successfully defend the position. The positions of the 16e RTS near Mailly-Raineval also came under determined attack, and the French artillery, now running short of ammunition, was able to offer only limited support. The Germans captured the village around 7 pm.

During the night of 8 June the 4e DIC was forced to attempt a retreat of nearly 50 km under cover of darkness to avoid encirclement. The first and second battalions of the 2e RIC were encircled and destroyed in the course of this movement, only the third battalion succeeded in reaching Brunvillers-la-Motte. The 16e and 24e RTS reached Angivilliers and Erquinvillers but were steady surrounded. During the night of 9 June elements of these units, along with two 75mm batteries of the 12e RAC, attempted to break out to the south but most were killed or captured. German troops, influenced by Nazi racial propaganda and frustrated by the stubborn resistance of the colonial soldiers, executed many African troops after surrender. Hundreds of men of the 4e DIC were killed in this manner, culminating in the Bois d’Eraine massacre, where 64 tirailleurs and 8 French officers were murdered.

The remnants of the division regrouped south of the Oise on 10 June 1940, but it had been effectively destroyed as a combat unit. Less than 600 infantrymen remained (360 from the 16e RTS, 150 from the 2e RIC, and 50 from the 24e RTS), along with one 75mm battery from the 12e RAC and one 105mm battery from the 212e RALC, both without ammunition, and 3 or 4 platoons of the 74e GRDI.

== Monuments and memorials ==
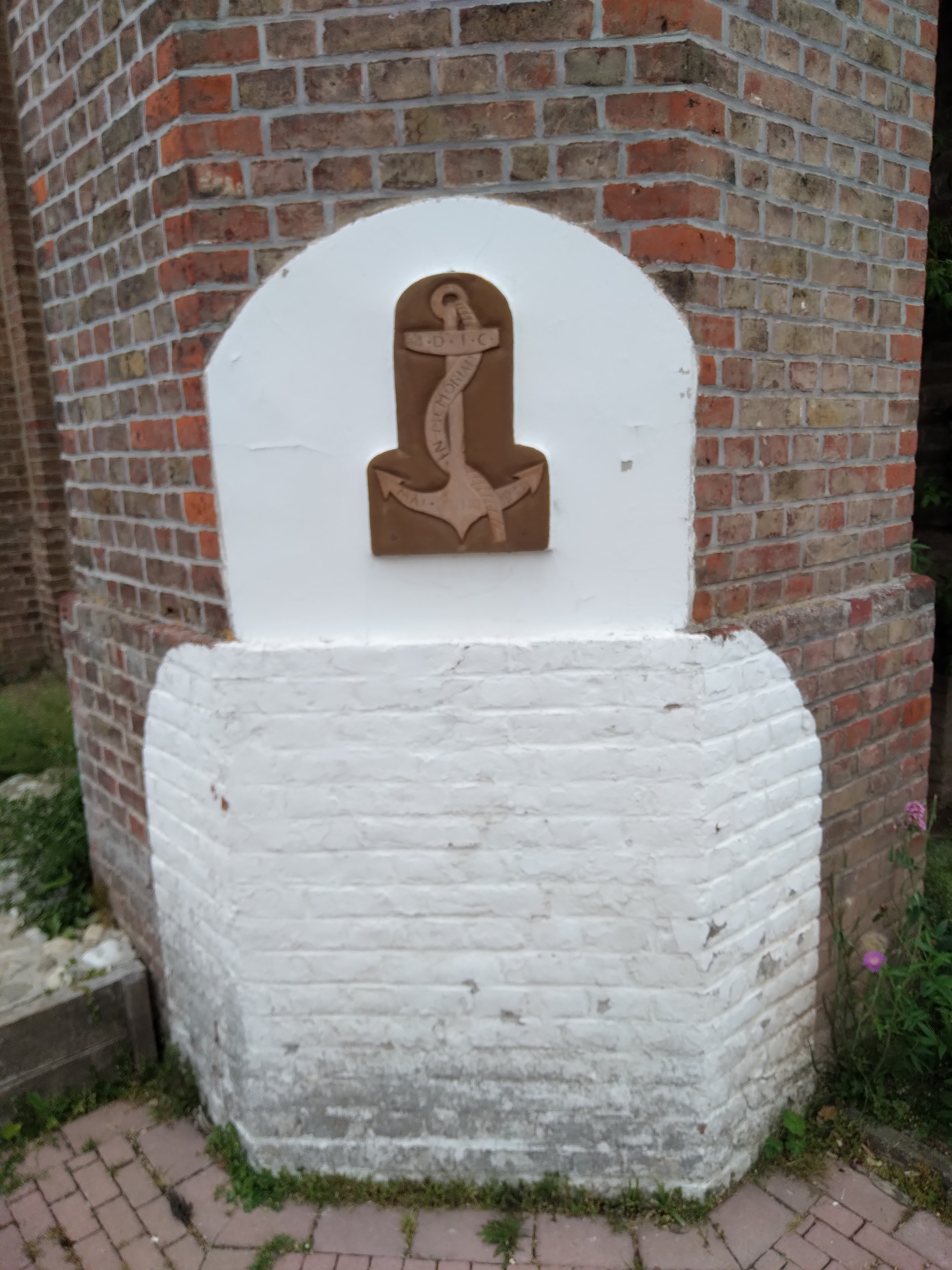
Memorial stele in Glisy.

There are a number of small monuments and memorial plaques dedicated to the 4e DIC in the vicinity of Amiens, including:

- A memorial stele with the division's anchor insignia at the entrance to the cemetery in Aubigny.
- A plaque on the wall of the Blangy-Tronville town hall.
- A plaque on the Franco-Prussian War monument in Cachy.
- A plaque honoring the 4e DIC and 7e DIC in the église Saint-Honoré in Cagny.
- A plaque in Démuin.
- A stele on the wall of the town cemetery in Fouilloy.
- A memorial stele with the division insignia in Glisy.
- A memorial stele in Le Hamel.
