= Bois d'Eraine massacre =

1940 Nazi war crime

Coordinates: 49°27′44″N 2°34′14″E

Bois d'Eraine Massacre
- Part of the Battle of France
- Location: Near Cressonsacq
- Date: 11 June 1940
- Target: French prisoners of war
- Attack type: Mass killing
- Deaths: ~74 killed
- Perpetrator: German Army
- Motive: Racism

The Bois d'Eraine massacre was a war crime carried out by the German Wehrmacht in June 1940 during the German invasion of France. On 11 June 1940, soldiers of the Infantry Regiment Großdeutschland executed around 74 prisoners belonging to the 4e Division d'Infanterie Coloniale of the French army near the town of Cressonsacq in the Oise Department. The massacre followed the killing of 150-500 captured French soldiers, mostly black tirailleurs from French West Africa, in the towns of Angivilliers, Erquinvilliers and Lieuvilliers between 9 and 11 June. It is believed that between 1,500 and 3,000 soldiers from the French colonies were killed in war crimes carried out by the Wehrmacht in 1940.

== Context ==
In May 1940 Nazi Germany launched its invasion of France, Belgium and the Netherlands. Utilizing blitzkrieg tactics, the German forces successfully broke through the allied lines at Sedan on 15 May, and by the end of the month the British Expeditionary Force and French First Army Group had been encircled at Dunkirk and forced to evacuate, while the remainder of the French army attempted to establish a new line of defense along the Somme. The 4e Division d'Infanterie Coloniale, composed of the 2e Régiment d'Infanterie Coloniale, 16e Régiment de Tirailleurs Sénégalais and 24e Régiment de Tirailleurs Sénégalais was tasked with covering the retreat of the French forces behind the Somme. On 24 May, after two days of combat at Aubigny, 50 captured tirailleurs of the 24e Régiment de Tirailleurs Sénégalais were executed by German troops, the first in what would become a series of massacres.

On 5 June, when the German forces launched their new offensive across the Somme with the aim of taking Paris, the 4e Division was holding a portion of the frontline in the Oise Department. From 7-9 June, a large portion of the division, including the 24e Régiment de Tirailleurs Sénégalais, was encircled in the villages of Angivilliers and Lieuvilliers. Bitter fighting resulted in hundreds of casualties on both sides, and German troops executed captured tirailleurs in reprisal, with 118 tirailleurs killed at Angivilliers and Lieuvilliers on 8 and 9 June. On 9 June the 24e Régiment de Tirailleurs Sénégalais launched a successful counterattack at Erquinvilliers which allowed a large number of French troops to escape the German encirclement, with their withdrawal being covered by a 300-strong rearguard of the 24e Régiment de Tirailleurs Sénégalais, many of whom were already wounded and thus unable to evacuate. This force successfully held out until it exhausted its ammunition on 10 June. When German troops retook the town they executed black soldiers who surrendered.

Among the retreating French troops which had escaped Erquinvilliers were several dozen men from the 16e and 24e Régiments de Tirailleurs Sénégalais. Without food or ammunition, they hid in the Bois d'Eraine in an attempt to evade German patrols. Around 19:00 on 10 June the Tirailleurs were discovered, and after a brief skirmish were forced to surrender to the Großdeutschland Regiment. The prisoners were then marched to a farm on the south edge of the bois d'Eraine near the commune of Bailleul-le-Soc.

== Massacre ==
On 11 June, the Germans separated the black troops from their white commanders. Battalion Commander Henry Bouquet, commander of the 2nd battalion of the 24e RTS, protested, declaring that the tirailleurs had surrendered on his orders and must be treated as soldiers. Captain Jean Speckel of the 16e RTS, who spoke German, translated, and declared his own pride at having commanded such troops. The ranking German officer on the scene called the African soldiers "savages", and refused to afford them the treatment guaranteed to prisoners of war under the Geneva Conventions. Eight French officers (Battalion Commander Henry Bouquet, Captain Jean Speckel, Captain Jacques Ris, Lieutenant Louis Roux, Lieutenant Étienne Erminy, Lieutenant Marcel Planchon, Lieutenant Jean Brocard, and sub-Lieutenant André Rotelle) were taken a kilometer away and shot. They were buried by two tirailleurs, Aka Tano and Faya Leno, who were themselves then killed and buried in the same ditch. An estimated 64 other black troops were executed and left unburied. The white enlisted soldiers and non-commissioned officers were treated as ordinary prisoners of war.

== Memorial and Commemoration ==
In 1941, a local farmer discovered the bodies of the eight French officers along with tirailleurs Tano and Leno, and the remains were exhumed and reburied in the town cemetery of Cressonsacq. After the war, the bodies were once more exhumed and transferred to the Cambronne-lès-Ribécourt national cemetery. The remains of tirailleur Aka Tano were returned to his native country of Côte-d'Ivoire by a descendent. In 1992, a memorial stele was erected in Cressonsacq.

== See also ==
- Chasselay massacre - Another massacre of captured Senegalese Tirailleurs by German troops on 20 June 1940.
- Le Paradis massacre - Massacre of British prisoners of war by German troops on 27 May 1940.
- Wormhoudt massacre - Massacre of British and French prisoners of war by German troops on 28 May 1940.
- Oignies and Courrières massacre - Massacre of French and Belgian civilians by German troops on 28 May 1940.
- Vinkt massacre - Massacre of Belgian civilians by German troops from 26-28 May 1940.
- War crimes of the Wehrmacht
