= 24th Senegalese Tirailleurs Regiment =

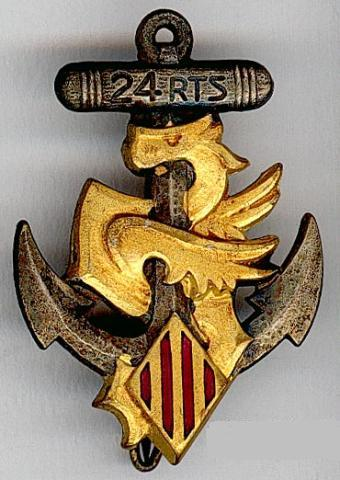
- Regimental insignia of the 24e RTS
- Active: 1923–1940, 1948-1955
- Country: France
- Branch: (France) French Army
- Type: Regiment
- Engagements: Rif War World War II: Battle of France; First Indochina War

The 24th Senegalese Tirailleurs Regiment (24^{e} régiment de tirailleurs sénégalais, 24e RTS), was a Senegalese tirailleurs regiment of the French army which saw combat in the Battle of France during World War II.

== History ==
=== Interwar Period ===
The regiment was created in 1923 and based at Perpignan and Sète, inheriting the colors and traditions of the 23e Regiment d'Infanterie Coloniale. From 1925–1927 elements of the regiment participated in the Rif War in the French Protectorate of Morocco, seeing action at Bab-Taza, M'sila, El Hadar, and Fès el Bali.

=== Second World War ===
Following the outbreak of the Second World War in 1939 the regiment was dispatched to Alsace, where it occupied positions along the Maginot Line during the so-called Phoney War as a component of the 4th Colonial Infantry Division (4^{e} division d'infanterie coloniale, 4e DIC). Following the German breakthrough at Sedan and crossing of the Meuse River in 1940, the 24e RTS was transferred westwards to the Somme, arriving near Amiens on 20 May 1940. On 24 May the regiment was tasked with counterattacking at Aubginy to reduce a German bridgehead across the Somme. The tirailleurs successfully retook the village, suffering up to 60% losses in the action. Some 50 wounded tirailleurs were executed by German troops of the 13. Infanterie-Division when German forces recaptured Aubigny the following day. On 28 May the regiment launched a final attack on Aubigny, reinforced by 12 Renault R35 tanks from the 40th Tank Battalion (40e Bataillon de Chars de Combat, 40e BCC). This effort was successful but immediate and determined German counterattacks obliged the regiment to withdraw under cover of darkness that night.

In June the Germans launched Case Red, an operation aimed at capturing Paris. The units of the 4e DIC put up a stiff resistance but German panzer units steadily overran the positions of the neighboring 16th Infantry Division (16e Division d'Infanterie, 16e DI) to the west, threatening to encircle the colonial troops. On 6 June the 24e RTS successfully repulsed German attacks north of Villers-Bretonneux. Executing a fighting retreat, the regiment held Merville-au-Bois against German attacks on 8 June. On 9 June the 24e RTS defended the villages of Angivilliers and Lieuvilliers alongside the 16e Régiment de Tirailleurs Sénégalais (16e RTS), losing 118 men, but was now surrounded by German forces. The regimental commander, Lt. Col Favre, attempted to hold Angivilliers with 300 men to cover the retreat of the rest of the unit. He was captured after sharp but brief combat on 10 June after this detachment had exhausted its ammunition. Captain Moïse Bébel, an Afro-Caribbean officer of the third battalion from Guadeloupe, attempted a breakout with 60 men during the night of 9 June but was captured and executed near Erquinvilliers. During the night of 9 June Commandant Henry Bouqet also attempted to regroup surrounded elements of the 16e and 24e RTS and lead a breakout attempt. Captured by the German Grossdeutschland Regiment the next day, the survivors were marched to a woods near Cressonsacq in the Oise Departement, where 8 French officers and 64 African tirailleurs were executed in the Bois d'Eraine massacre. Of the roughly 3,000 men of the 24e RTS, only about one hundred succeeded in escaping from the German encirclement.

On 25 June 1940, in accordance with the armistice between Vichy France and Nazi Germany, all tirailleur regiments in metropolitan France were dissolved.

=== Post-War ===
The 24e RTS was reconstituted in May 1948, and two battalions were sent to French Indochina to fight the Viet Minh insurgency. The regiment was dissolved in 1955.
