= Senegalese Tirailleurs =

Colonial infantry in the French Army

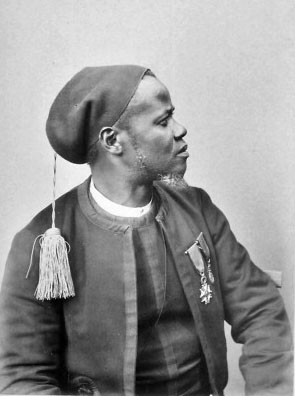
Yora Comba, 38 years old, lieutenant in the tirailleurs sénégalais, born in Saint-Louis (Exposition universelle de 1889)

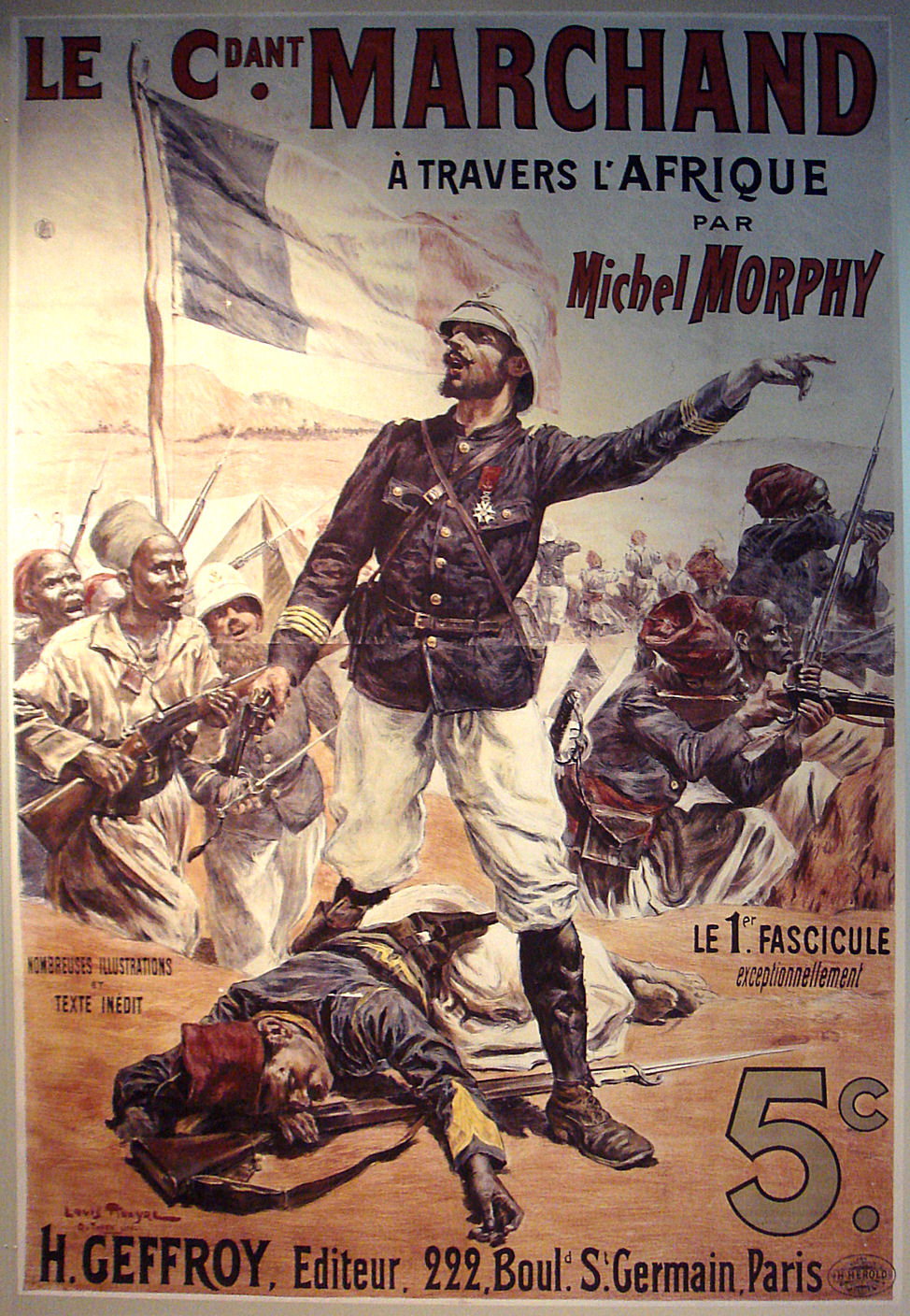
Tirailleurs Sénégalais under the command of Jean-Baptiste Marchand, 1898

The Senegalese Tirailleurs (French: Tirailleurs Sénégalais) were a corps of colonial infantry in the French Army. They were initially recruited from Saint-Louis, Senegal, the initial colonial capital city of French West Africa and subsequently throughout Western, Central and Eastern Africa (the main sub-Saharan regions of the French colonial empire). The noun tirailleur, which translates variously as 'skirmisher', 'rifleman', or 'sharpshooter', was a designation given by the French Army to indigenous infantry recruited in the various colonies and overseas possessions of the French Empire during the 19th and 20th centuries.

Despite recruitment not being limited to Senegal, and including regiments from French Soudan (contemporary Mali), these infantry units took on the adjective sénégalais since that was where the first black African Tirailleur regiment had been formed. The first Senegalese Tirailleurs were formed in 1857 and by the 1930s, men from territories like Chad and Gabon also comprised parts of the corps. These African soldiers served France in a number of wars, including World War I (providing around 200,000 troops, more than 135,000 of which fought in Europe, and 30,000 of whom were killed) and World War II (recruiting 179,000 troops, 40,000 of which were deployed to Western Europe).

Other tirailleur regiments were raised in French North Africa from the Arab and Berber populations of Algeria, Tunisia and Morocco; collectively they were called tirailleurs nord-africains or Turcos. Tirailleur regiments were also raised in Indochina; they were called Vietnamese, Tonkinese or Annamites Tirailleurs.

== History ==
=== Origins ===
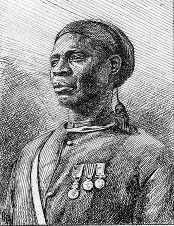
Tirailleur from the Bambara people (Mali) (engraving, 1890)

The Senegalese Tirailleurs were formed in 1857 by Louis Faidherbe, Governor-General of French West Africa, because he lacked sufficient French troops to control the territory and meet other requirements of the first phase of colonization. The formal decree for the formation of this force was signed on 21 July 1857 in Plombières-les-Bains by Napoleon III. Recruitment was later extended to other French colonies in Africa. During its early years the corps included some former slaves bought from West African slave-owners as well as prisoners of war. By 1891, fugitive slaves from Liberty Villages, settlements established as part of France's effort to address the abolition of slavery, could receive official emancipation by enlistment with the tirailleurs sénégalais. Subsequent recruitment was either by voluntary enlistment or on occasion by an arbitrary form of conscription. Men who voluntarily joined the corps often did so partly due to the special opportunities to accumulate wealth or social standing outside of traditional paths. Newly liberated slaves were incorporated into Tirailleur military units or worked as auxiliary laborers. In some cases Tirailleurs married emancipated former slave women, allowing the soldiers to circumvent the common regional practice of familial negotiation and payment of bride-wealth.

=== 1870–1914 ===
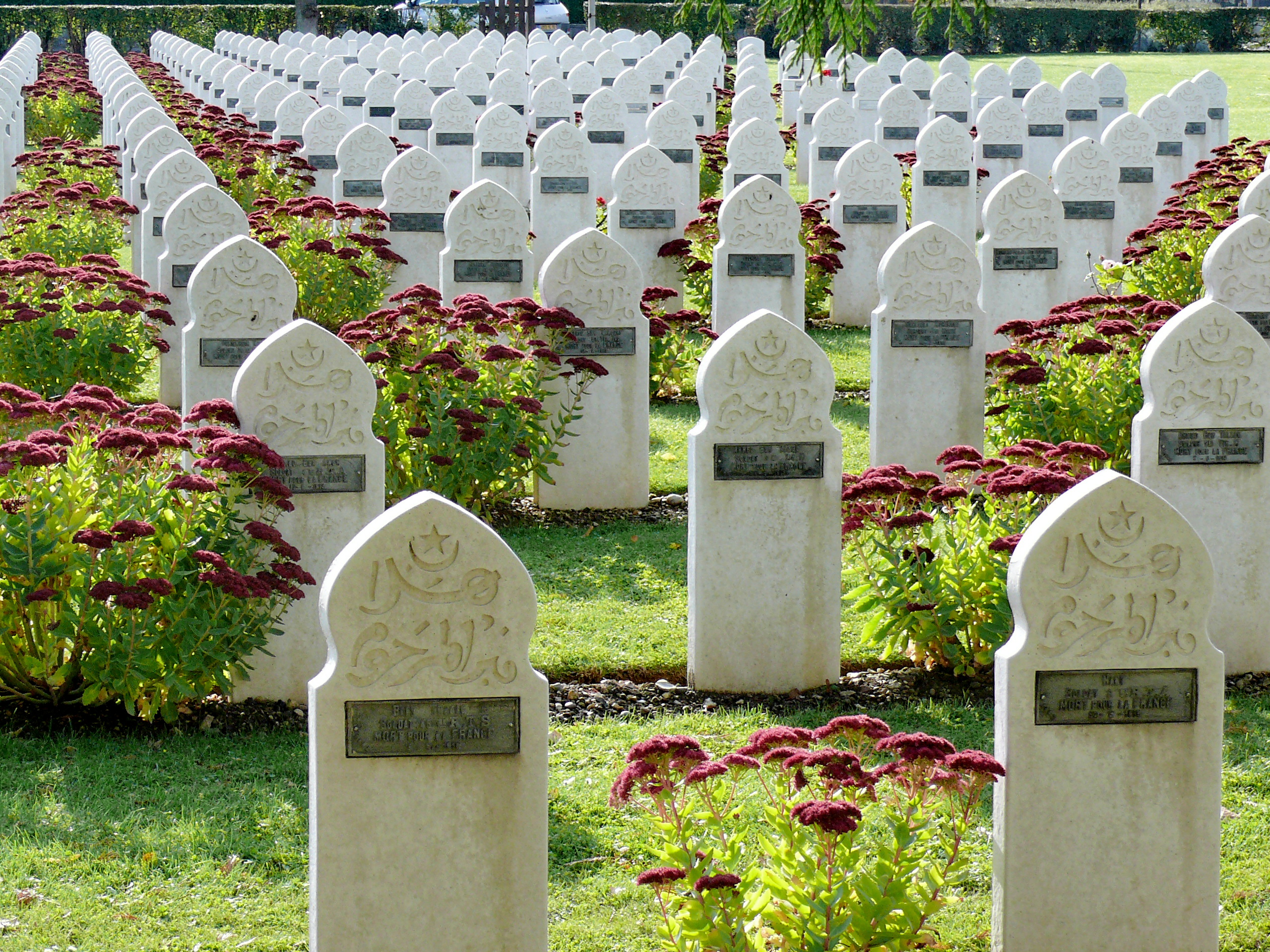
Muslim area of the national cemetery in Amiens (Saint-Acheul) – in the foreground is the tomb of a soldier of the 45e régiment de tirailleurs sénégalais killed in the battle of the Somme

In the aftermath of the Franco-Prussian War, the Senegalese tirailleurs continued to provide the bulk of French garrisons in West and Central Africa. Their overall numbers remained limited. However, in anticipation of the First World War, Colonel Charles Mangin described in his 1910 book La force noire his conception of a greatly expanded French colonial army, whilst Jean Jaurès, in his L'armée nouvelle, suggested that the French Army should look elsewhere to recruit its armies due to the falling birthrate in mainland France.

A company-sized detachment of tirailleurs sénégalais took part in the conquest of Madagascar (1895), although the bulk of the non-European troops employed in this campaign were Algerian and Hausa tirailleurs. Regiments of tirailleurs malgaches were subsequently recruited in Madagascar, using the Senegalese units as a model.

In 1896, a small expedition consisting mainly of 200 tirailleurs sénégalais was assembled in Loango (French Congo) under Captain Jean-Baptiste Marchand. This "Marchand Mission" took two years to cross hundreds of miles of unexplored bush until they reached Fashoda on the Nile. Here they encountered British and Egyptian troops under Major-General Kitchener, who had just defeated the Mahdi's Dervish army near Khartoum. While the Fashoda Incident raised the possibility of war between France and Britain, tribute was paid to the courage and endurance of Marchand and his Senegalese tirailleurs by both sides.

By a decree dated July 7, 1900 the Tirailleurs sénégalais, the Tirailleurs indochinois, Tirailleurs malgaches and the "marsouins" were no longer under the jurisdiction of the Ministry of the Navy and Colonies, but were reclassified as Troupes coloniales, different from the mainland elements Metropolitan army and separate from the Armée d’Afrique of the Maghreb. The anchor badge of the Troupes coloniales was worn on the collar from 1914, and when the Adrian helmet was adopted in WW1, an insignia with the anchor behind a flaming grenade was worn by the Tirailleurs Sénégalais.

During the early 1900s, the tirailleurs sénégalais saw active service in the French Congo and Chad while continuing to provide garrisons for the French possessions in West and Central Africa. In 1908, two battalions of tirailleurs sénégalais landed at Casablanca to begin nearly twenty years of active service in Morocco by Senegalese units. On 14 July 1913, the 1e regiment de tirailleurs sénégalais paraded their standard at Longchamp, the first occasion upon which Senegalese troops had been seen in metropolitan France. New flags were presented to the 2e, 3e and 4e RTS at the same parade.

The originaires were a group of Tirailleurs specifically from the Four Communes of Senegal who, beginning in the mid-19th century, were granted a unique legal status by the French government. Unlike other African subjects in French colonies, originaires had French citizenship while maintaining many of their religious and cultural practices. This dual status meant that they were not subject to the French Civil Code but instead operated under statut personnel, a legal framework allowing them to adhere to Islamic law in personal matters such as marriage, divorce, and inheritance.

The statut personnel created a parallel legal system where French and Islamic laws coexisted. A ministerial decree in on May 10, 1857 allowed West African residents of Saint-Louis to use Muslim tribunals for "matters related to personal status," even if they were French citizens. This accommodation recognized practices like polygyny, which were permissible under Islamic law but conflicted with the monogamy required by French civil law. The statut personnel allowed Senegalese Tirailleurs to maintain Islamic marital practices, including polygyny, despite French laws mandating monogamy. This dual legal system often caused administrative challenges, such as distributing family allocations among multiple wives. After Blaise Diagne's 1915 legislation made military service mandatory for originaires, tensions arose between French secular ideals and the cultural traditions of Muslim soldiers. Despite criticism of the statut personnel as incompatible with French law, it remained intact due to the military’s reliance on Tirailleurs and the need to maintain their loyalty.

=== World War I ===
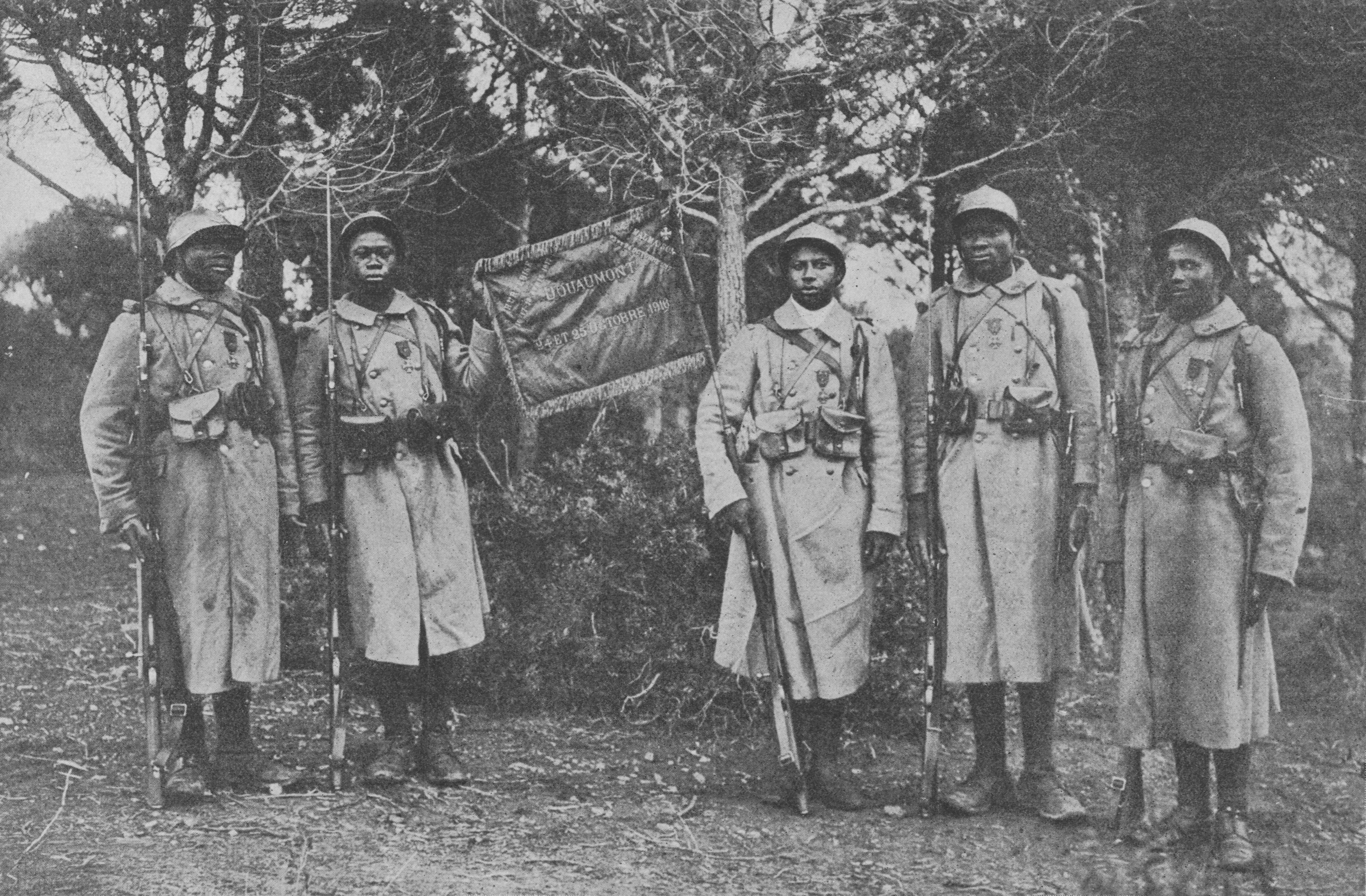
The flag of the 43rd Senegalese Tirailleurs Battalion decorated with the fourragère, who fought in the recapture of Fort Douaumont in October 1916

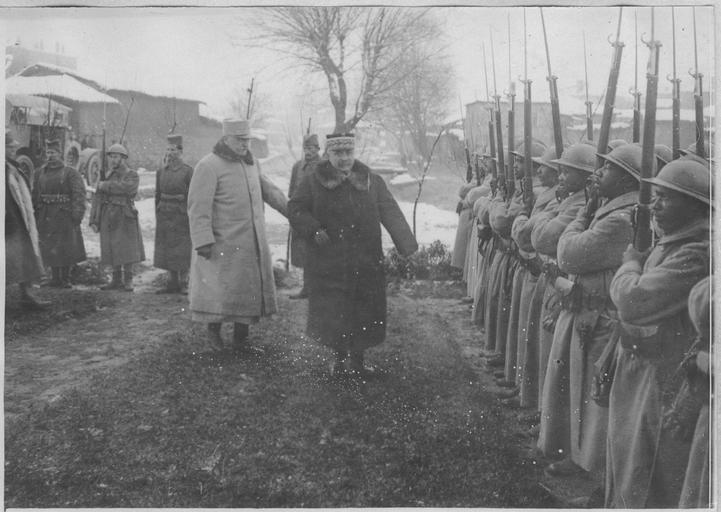
Review of Tirailleurs by General Guillaumat. Photo taken at the village of Vatokhorion, in the municipality of Florina in Greece, on 7 March 1918.

There were 21 battalions of Tirailleurs Sénégalais (BTS) in the French Army in August 1914, all serving in either West Africa or on active service in Morocco.

With the outbreak of war 37 battalions of French, North African and Senegalese infantry were transferred from Morocco to France. Five Senegalese battalions were soon serving on the Western Front, while others formed part of the reduced French garrison in Morocco. The 5th BTS formed part of a French column which was wiped out near Khenifra, during the Battle of El Herri on 13 November 1914, with 646 dead. The 10th, 13th, 16th and 21st BTS subsequently saw heavy fighting in Morocco, reinforced by 9,000 additional Senegalese tirailleurs brought up from French West Africa. Morocco was the last place in the French empire where Tirailleurs Sénégalais were permitted to travel with their West African wives, part of a broader French push for professionalism and the trend of national armies in Europe to discontinue their use of auxiliary services and provisions by civilians.

On the Western Front the Tirailleurs Sénégalais served with distinction at Ypres and Dixmude during the Battle of Flanders in late 1914, at the Battle of Verdun in the recapture of Fort de Douaumont in October 1916, during the battle of Chemin des Dames in April 1917 and at the Battle of Reims in 1918. Losses were particularly heavy in Flanders (estimated from 3,200 to 4,800) and Chemin des Mains (7,000 out of 15,500 tirailleurs engaged).

In 1915 seven battalions of Tirailleurs Sénégalais were amongst the 24 infantry battalions the French sent to the Dardanelles as the Corps Expéditionnaire d'Orient. Total French casualties in this campaign reached 27,000 but the Senegalese and regular Colonial Infantry were noted for the high morale that they maintained in spite of losses that reached two out of three in some units. The Senegalese tirailleurs particularly distinguished themselves in the attack during the initial French landings on the southern shore of the Dardanelles. After the withdrawal from the Dardanelles and the redeployment to the Macedonian front, further Senegalese battalions were deployed in this theatre of war.

==== New recruitment drive ====
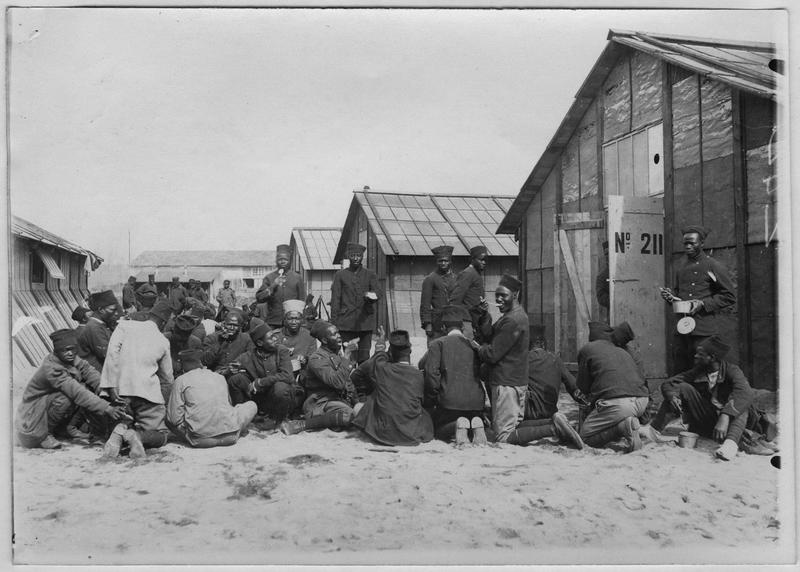
Tirailleurs at a hivernage camp at Fréjus in March 1916

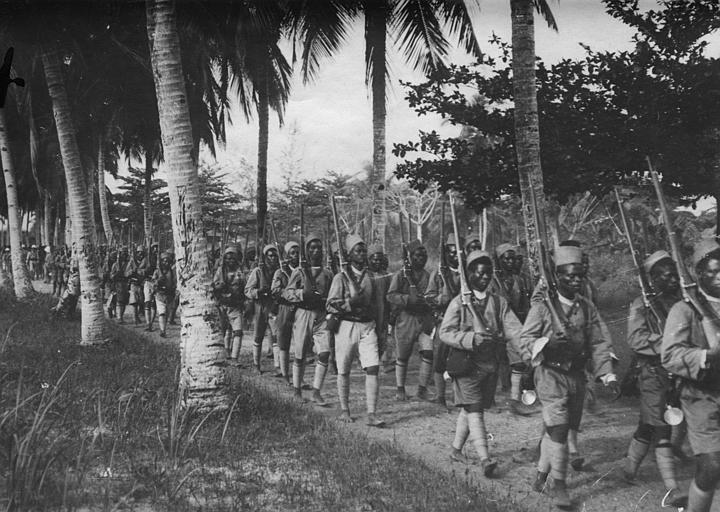
Tirailleurs in the German colony of Kamerun, which was occupied during the Kamerun campaign

French military policy towards the use of African troops in Europe changed in 1915. The French high command realized that the war would last far longer than they had originally imagined. They therefore authorized a major recruitment drive in West Africa. As a result, a further 93 Senegalese battalions were raised between 1915 and 1918, of which 42 saw service in France itself. The usual practice was to bring together battalions of white Colonial Infantry (les marsouins) and African Tirailleurs into regiments mixtes coloniaux. (Four such regiments were formed from the seven tirailleurs and five battalions of Infanterie Coloniale deployed at Gallipoli.)The harsh conditions of trench warfare were a particular source of suffering to the un-acclimatized African soldiers and, after 1914/15, the practice of hivernage was adopted: withdrawing them to the south of France for training and re-equipping each winter. In spite of their heavy losses in almost every major battle of the Western Front, the discipline and morale of the "Colonial Corps" remained high throughout the war.

Fréjus in southeastern France became the main centre for hivernage (wintering) for the Senegalese Tirailleurs. The town also contained segregated hospitals with images of African village life painted on the walls.

In November 1915, a large anti-French uprising broke out among the tribes in the regions of present-day Mali and Burkina Faso. The reasons for the discontent came from the forced military recruitment of soldiers. These regions were subject to significant recruitment of colonial troops to serve on the front lines of the First World War. The last resistance was suppressed only in September 1916. During the suppression of the uprising, over 100 villages were destroyed by French colonial troops.

At the 90th anniversary commemorations of the battle of Verdun, then-president Jacques Chirac made a speech evoking the 72,000 colonial combatants killed during the war, mentioning the 'Moroccan infantry, the tirailleurs from Senegal, Indochina (Annam and Cochinchina), and the marsouins of the troupes de marine.'

==== Occupation of the Rhineland ====
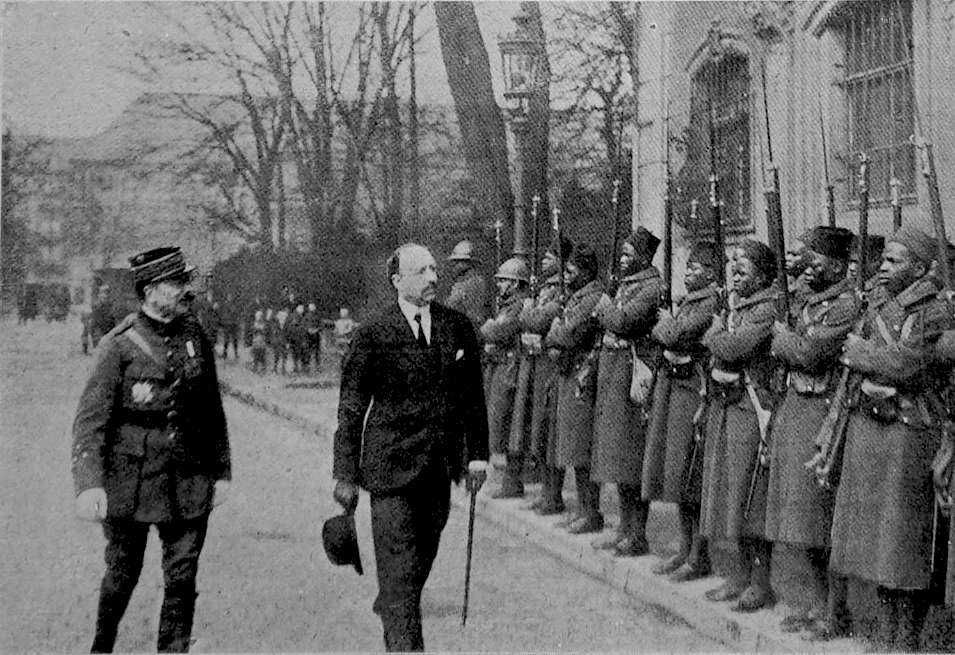
Senegalese Tirailleurs amongst the Honour Guard being inspected by Paul Tirard and Jean Degoutte 8 April 1920

The Armistice of 11 November 1918 included provisions for the Occupation of the Rhineland by the Allies of World War I, and the French Third Republic played a major role in it. Between 25,000 and 40,000 colonial soldiers were part of this force. German attempts were made to discredit the use of non-European soldiers by the French during this occupation, as had earlier been the case during World War I. Although no hard evidence was produced, many campaigners claimed that the colonial soldiers – and the Senegalese in particular – were responsible for a substantial number of rapes and sexual assaults. Children resulting from these unions were stigmatised as "Rhineland bastards" and subsequently suffered under the racial policy of Nazi Germany.

=== Between the World Wars ===
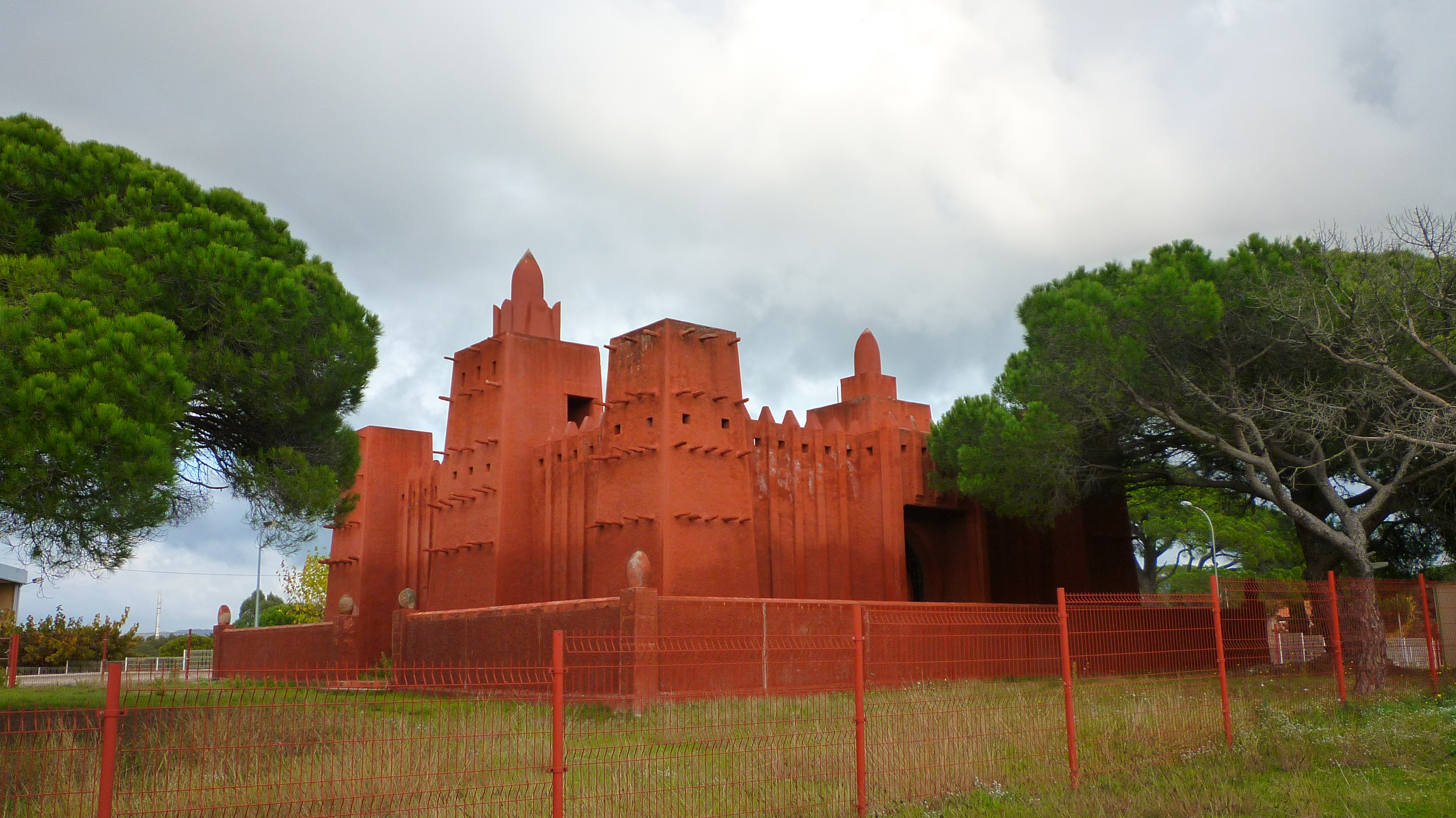
The Missiri Mosque, a 1930 replica of the Great Mosque of Djenné built in the French town of Fréjus for the use of colonial soldiers

During the war, the much-reduced French garrison in Morocco had consisted largely of battalions of Tirailleurs Sénégalais, who were not affected by the divided loyalties of locally recruited troops and who could be more readily spared from service on the Western Front than French troops. On 13 April 1925, the Rif War spilled over into the French protectorate in Morocco when eight thousand Berber fighters attacked a line of French outposts that had recently been established in disputed territory north of the Ouergha River. The majority of these posts were held by Senegalese and North African tirailleurs. By 27 April 1925, 39 out of 66 posts had fallen and their garrisons massacred, or had been abandoned. Faced with what had become a major war, the French increased their forces in Morocco to approximately 100,000 men. West African tirailleurs continued to play a major part in subsequent operations in both the Spanish Protectorate (until 1926) and Southern Morocco (until 1934). In one of many engagements, the 2nd Battalion of the 1st Regiment of Tirailleurs Sénégalais won 91 citations for bravery during fighting around Aïn el Gatar on 22 June 1926.

In 1938, the tirailleurs were called in to help suppress a railway strike in Senegal, an event now known as the Thiès massacre.

=== World War II ===
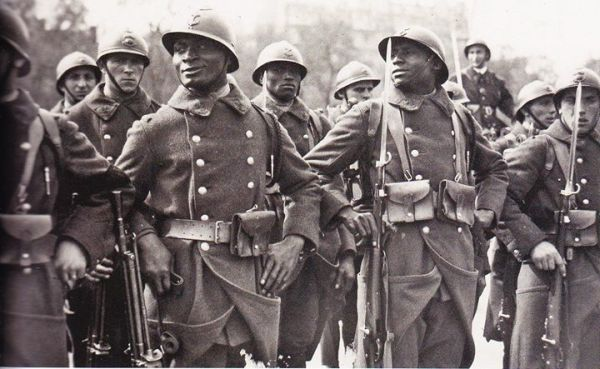
Senegalese Tirailleurs serving in France, 1934

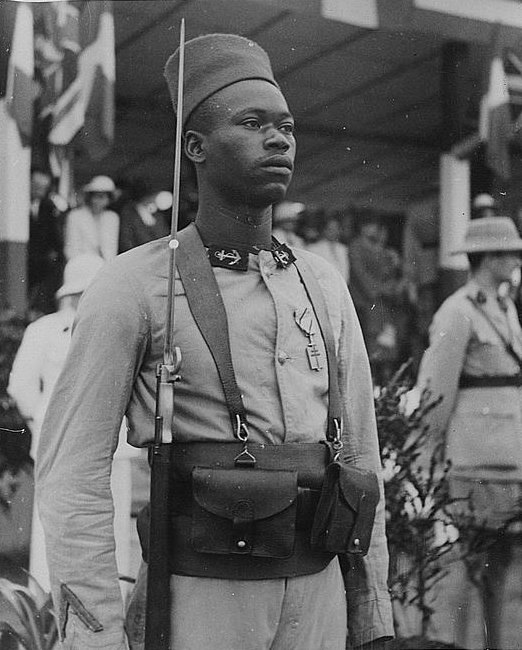
1942, Brazzaville, French Equatorial Africa. A tirailleur who has been awarded the Cross of Liberation by General Charles de Gaulle

On the eve of the Second World War, five regiments of Tirailleurs Sénégalais were stationed in France in addition to a brigade based in Algeria. The 2e division coloniale sénégalaise was permanently deployed in the south of France due to the potential threat from Italy. It was also reasoned the climate was more suitable for African soldiers. This deployment of Tirailleurs, outside of their regions of recruitment and traditional peacetime service, arose because of the heavy casualties of the First World War. This had affected the number of metropolitan Frenchmen in the military service age group of twenty to twenty-five by more than half. Up to 200,000 tirailleurs were active during the war, which constituted about nine percent of the French forces.

During the Battle of France, the Senegalese and other African tirailleur units served with distinction at Gien, Bourges, and Buzancais. German troops, indoctrinated with Nazi racial doctrines, expressed outrage at having fought against "inferior" opponents. Along with other war crimes of the Wehrmacht, German forces massacred captured tirailleurs on multiple occasions during the 1940 campaign. The first incident occurred on 24 May 1940, when fifty wounded soldiers of the 24e Régiment de Tirailleurs Sénégalais were executed by Wehrmacht troops after having held up the German advance for two days at Aubigny. More massacres followed the German crossing of the Somme from 5 June onward. On June 5, at Hangest-sur-Somme, a number of tirailleurs were executed after surrendering. One French officer recounted: “The enemy then appears, furious, beside himself, ready to finish us off all together. An extremely engaged intervention by a German officer prevents the troops from executing the European officers, but there was no indigenous man alive anymore after a few moments.”

Between 7 and 10 June the 16e and 24e Régiments de Tirailleurs Sénégalais, part of the 4e Division d'Infanterie Coloniale, fought a series of battles along the Somme at Angivillers, Lieuvillers and Erquinvillers. A large portion of the division became encircled during the course of the action. On the night of 9 June near Erquinvillers the Germans repeated the practice of separating white and black prisoners: “The Europeans . . . had to sit in front of a ravine under the barrels of machine guns while about fifty surviving Tirailleurs were led to a nearby place and shot with a machine gun. We, the officers, were able to confirm this later when we were led onto trucks that drove us toward captivity.” On 9 June, the 24e Régiment de Tirailleurs Sénégalais launched a successful counterattack at Erquinvilliers, breaking the German encirclement and allowing part of the 4e Division to escape. On taking each of the towns, German troops executed captured black soldiers, killing between 150 and 500. On 11 June, roughly 74 Senegalese tirailleurs and white officers of the 4e Division d'Infanterie Coloniale were executed near Cressonsacq in the Bois d’Eraine massacre. Elements of the 8th Panzer Division destroyed the 2nd Battalion of the 5e Régiment d'Infanterie Colonial Mixte Sénégalais of the 6th Colonial Infantry Division that was defending an abandoned farm near Neuf-Bellay on 13 June. Local villagers impressed to clean up the battlefield reported that some bodies of the riflemen were "tied to trees or hanging from branches, some partially or completely burned. Empty jerricans were reported nearby."

One of the best-recorded incidents, photographed by the German perpetrators, was the Chasselay massacre which took place on 19 June 1940 near Lyon. Soldiers of the 25e Régiment de Tirailleurs Sénégalais surrendered to the German troops in this area after exhausting their ammunition. Following the surrender, some fifty tirailleurs were separated from their white officers and ordered to stand in an open field, where they were machinegunned by German tanks. The tanks then drove back and forth over the bodies of the dead tirailleurs to ensure there would be no survivors. On the same day, a further 14 tirailleurs were executed at Sillé-le-Guillaume.

German troops were also responsible for non-lethal abuses of Senegalese tirailleurs. In many cases, German soldiers tortured captured black soldiers, and often refused to bury the bodies of colonial troops. It was common for captured tirailleurs to be denied food, water and medicine by their German captors.

The Senegalese Tirailleurs saw extensive service in West Africa, Italy, and Corsica. During 1944, they assisted in the liberation of southern France. The 9th DIC (Colonial Infantry Division) included the 4th, 6th, and 13th Regiments of Senegalese Tirailleurs, and fought from Toulon to the Swiss border between August and November 1944.

After the Liberation of France, the Tirailleurs concluded their service in Europe. When it came time for French forces to lead the victory parade in Paris Allied High Command stipulated that they could not contain any black soldiers. They were replaced by newly recruited French volunteers, on the order of Charles de Gaulle. This process became known as blanchiment. Faced with U.S. restrictions on the size of the French forces, de Gaulle chose to incorporate the various partisan groups within the structure of the official army. The complicated process of discharge and repatriation of the Tirailleurs, coupled with the refusal of France to pay wage arrears due to released prisoners of war, led to several incidents of violence. The most notable of these was the Thiaroye massacre, in 1944, during which the French killed between 35 and 300 (sources vary) Tirailleurs. Though the Tirailleurs Sénégalais had been promised that in recognition of their service they would become equal citizens of France, this pledge was not kept following the end of hostilities.

=== After 1945 ===
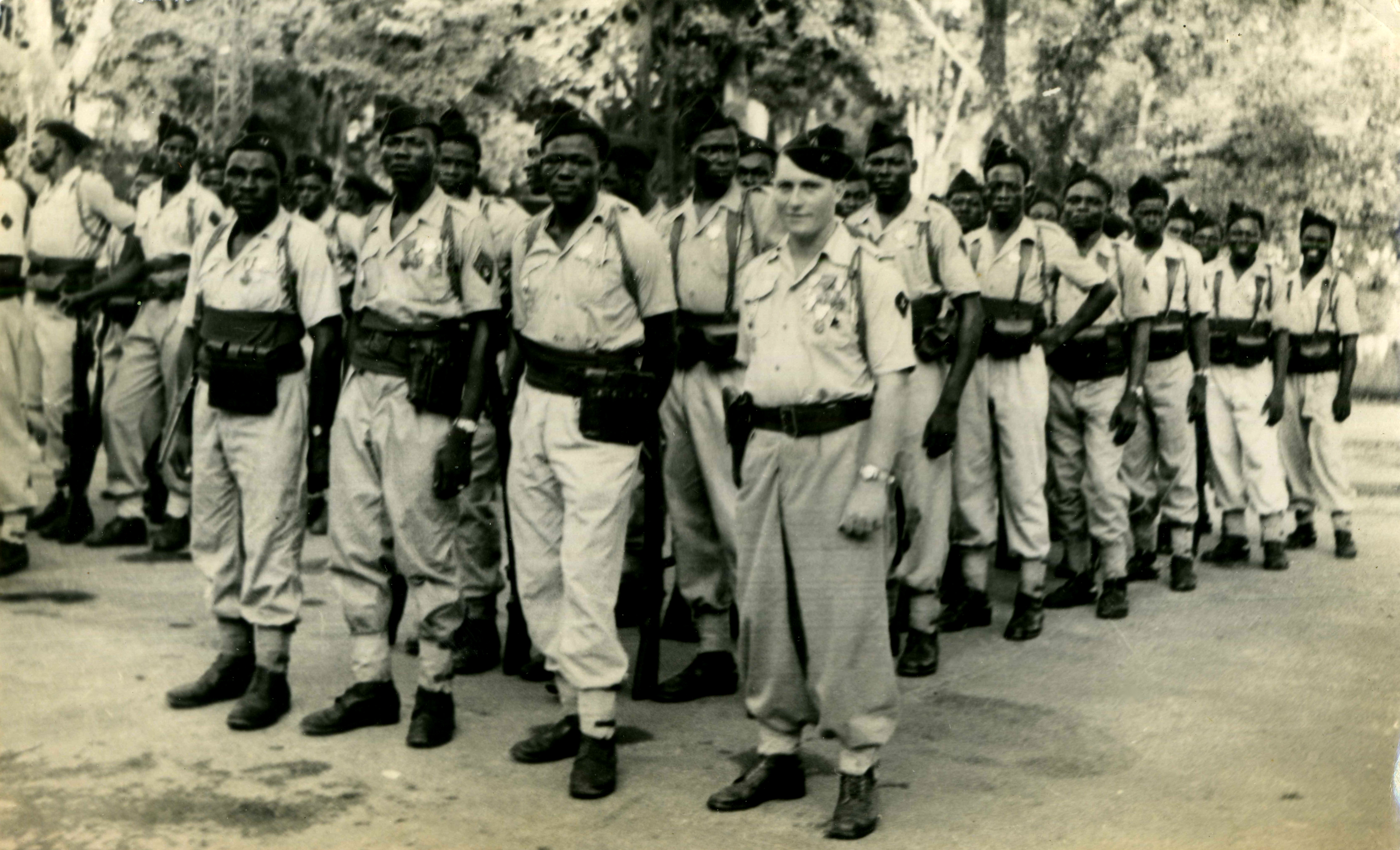
Senegalese Tirailleurs in Hanoi during the First Indochina War, 14 July 1950

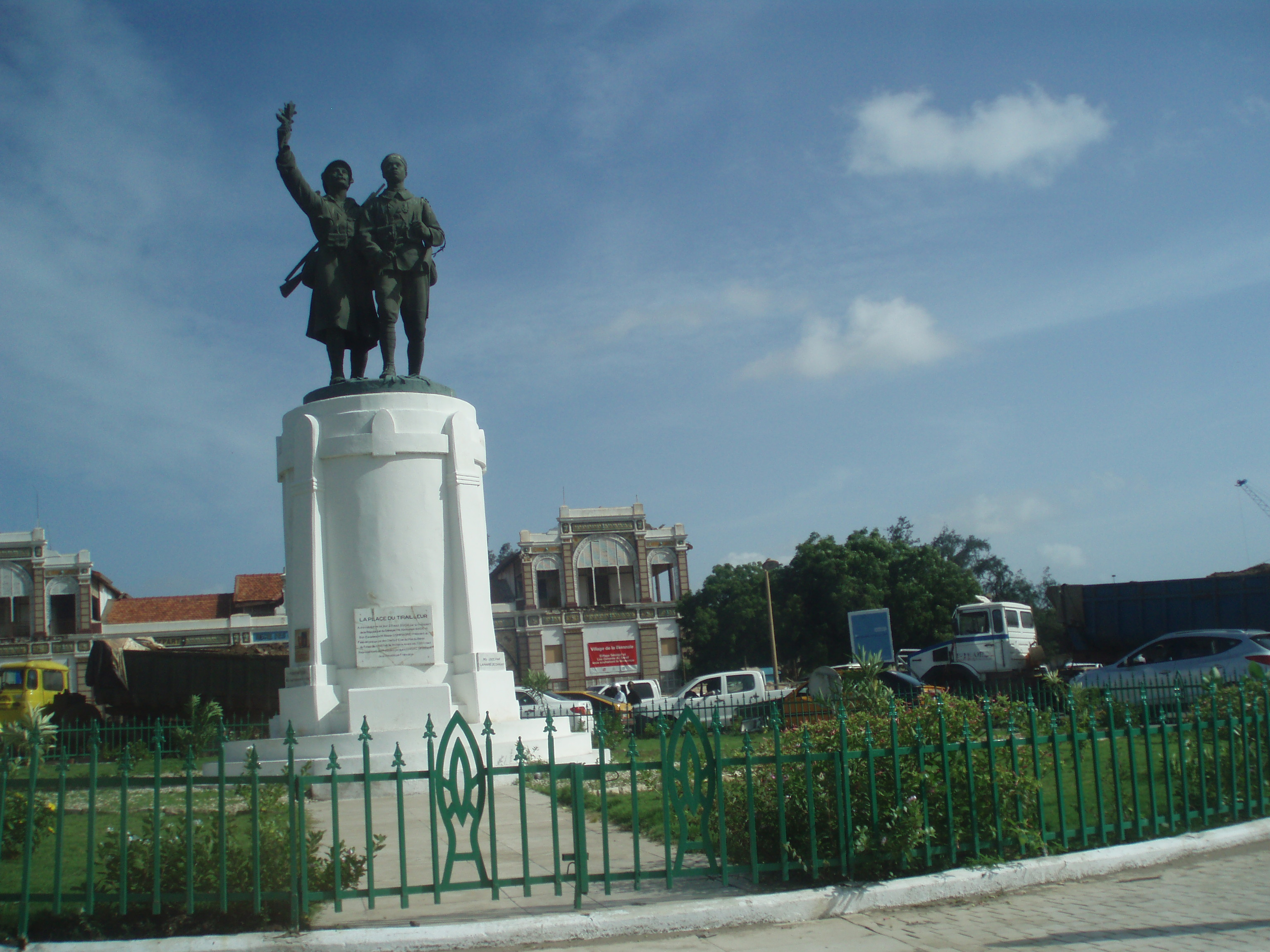
Le Place du Tirailleur Sénégalais with the Monument Demba et Dupont in front of the Dakar train station in 2012.

The 24e Regiment de Marche de Tirailleurs Sénégalais, comprising two battalions, served in the Indochina War between 1946 and 1954. Several independent battalions of Tirailleurs Sénégalais fought in the same theatre of war. The Tirailleurs Sénégalais comprised up to 16 percent of the French forces during the Indochina War. The Tirailleurs also served in the suppression of the 1947 uprising in Madagascar against French colonial rule . In 1949 there were still nine regiments of Tirailleurs Sénégalais in the French Army, serving in West Africa, Morocco, Algeria, Tunisia and Indochina.

The French reception of the Tirailleurs Sénégalais during World War II and in the immediate postwar years was complex and shaped by a mix of wartime necessity and entrenched racial stereotypes. While the Tirailleurs Sénégalais made significant contributions to France’s military efforts, particularly during the First and Second World Wars, their reception by the French public and government was marked by both admiration and paternalism.

In the years leading up to and during WWII, the French government sought to minimize direct contact between metropolitan French civilians and African soldiers, particularly as racial prejudices were pervasive. French images of Africans were rooted in longstanding stereotypes that depicted them as biologically inferior and driven by “savage” and “animallike” impulses, a view reinforced by colonial and pseudo-scientific discourses. As a result, the presence of African soldiers on French soil was seen with some trepidation, and efforts were made to segregate the troops from the general public when possible.

Despite these prejudices, the French government sought to manage the situation by promoting alternative, more positive stereotypes of the Tirailleurs Sénégalais. The government capitalized on the concept of the "noble savage" and emphasized the soldiers’ loyalty to France, their bravery, and their “childlike” innocence. These portrayals were intended to ease public fears and promote the idea that the African soldiers, while culturally different, were loyal and self-sacrificing in their service to the French cause. The paternalistic rhetoric of "La force noire", promoted by figures like General Charles Mangin, played a central role in reshaping the narrative about the soldiers. However, these efforts did little to challenge the overarching colonial myths that Africans, while admirable in their bravery, still required French leadership and guidance.

After the war, these representations continued to dominate postwar iconography. Memorials were erected to honor the contributions of the Tirailleurs Sénégalais, but they often remained impersonal abstractions. The soldiers themselves were rarely named or given individualized recognition, a stark contrast to the glorification of their French officers and commanders. Monuments like the one raised to General Mangin in Paris emphasized the leadership of the French over the individual sacrifices of the African soldiers, reinforcing the message that colonial French authority was paramount in shaping the destiny of the colonized peoples. The soldiers were celebrated as symbols of loyalty and bravery, yet their humanity and individual experiences were obscured by a larger narrative that continued to dehumanize them as subjects of the French empire rather than as full citizens of France.

During the Algerian War the Tirailleurs Sénégalais saw extensive active service from 1954 to 1962, mainly as part of the quadrillage – a grid of occupation detachments intended to protect farms and roads in rural areas. About 12 separate Senegalese units (either three-battalion regiments or single battalions) served in French North Africa between 1954 and 1967, when the last French troops were withdrawn. During 1958–59 the Tirailleur units were in part dissolved, as African personnel transferred to newly formed national armies when the French colonies of West and Central Africa became independent. Substantial numbers of former tirailleurs continued to serve in the French Army but as individual volunteers in integrated Colonial (later Marine) Infantry or Artillery units. The Tirailleurs Sénégalais lost their distinctive historic identity during this process. As an example, the 1er RTS, raised in 1857, became the 61st Marine Infantry Regiment in December 1958.

The last Senegalese unit in the French Army was disbanded in 1964.

The last Senegalese Tirailleur to have served in World War I, Abdoulaye Ndiaye, died at the age of 104 in November 1998. He had been wounded in the Dardanelles.

== Uniforms ==
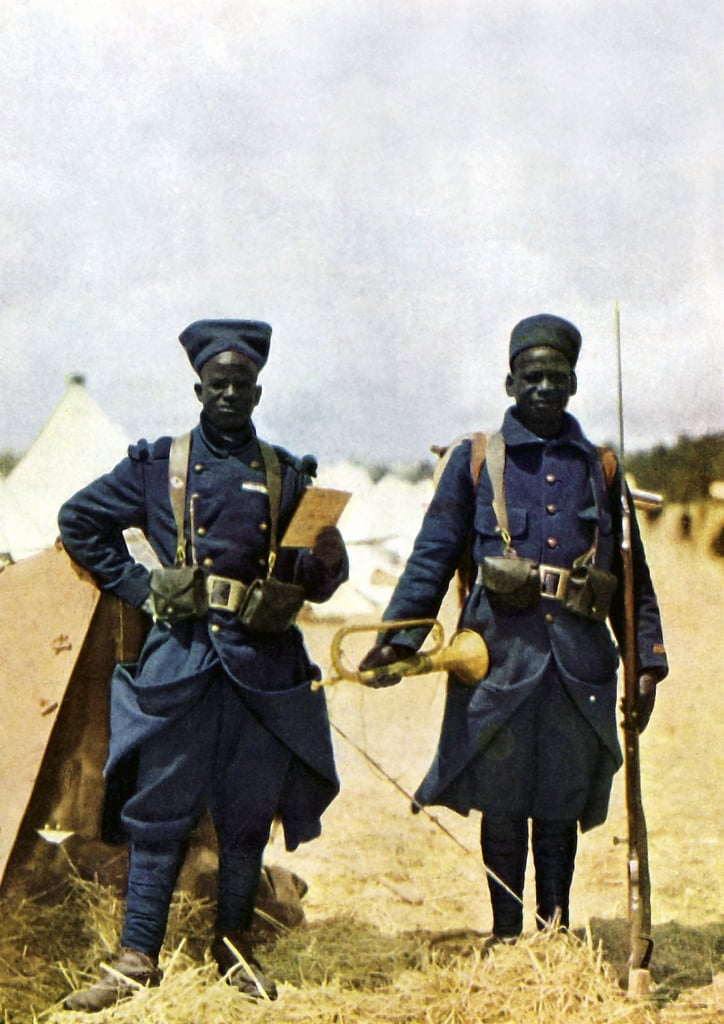
Tirailleurs posing for an autochrome photograph in September 1914

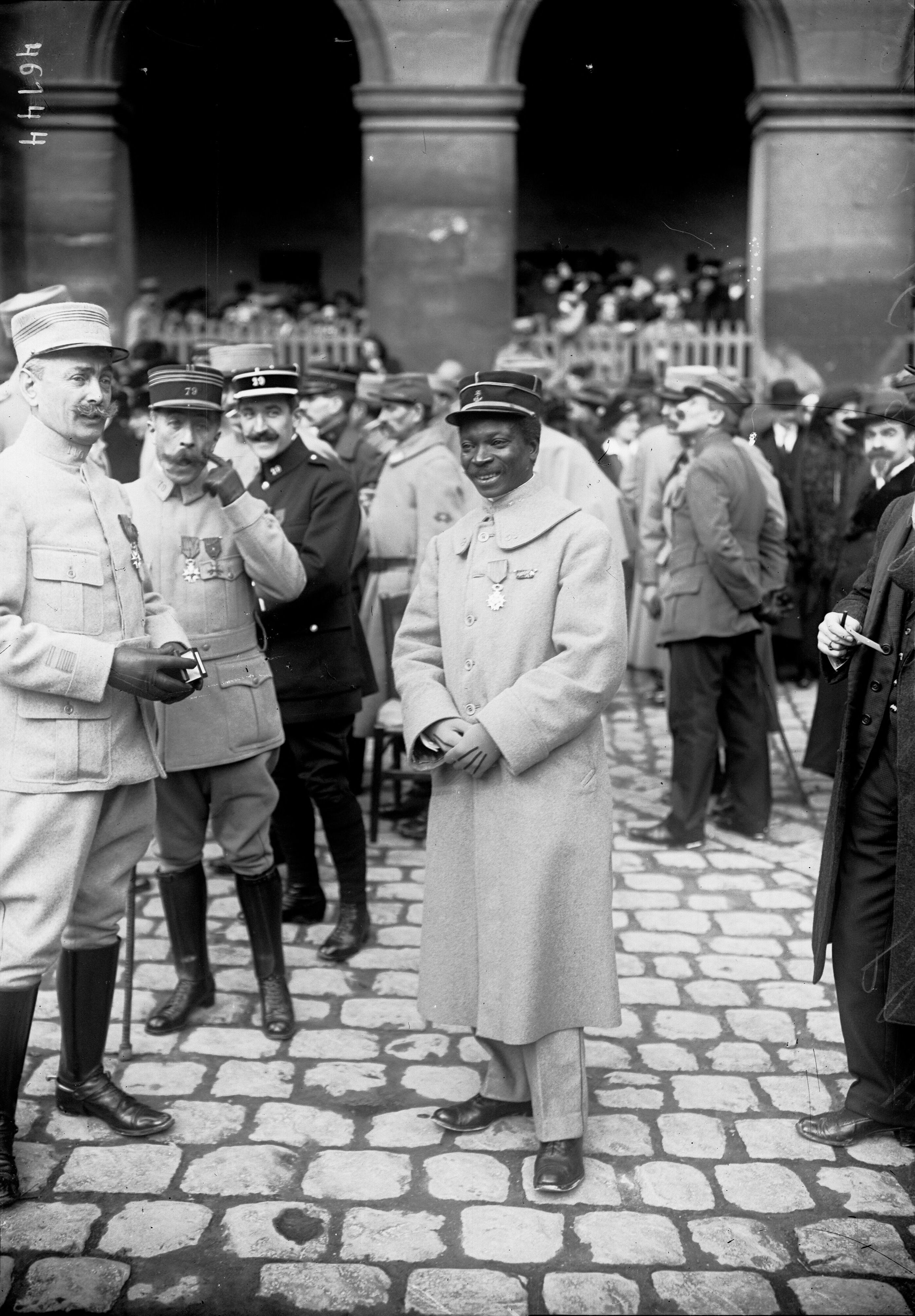
The son of Dinah Salifou decorated with the Légion d'honneur on 20 January 1916

From 1857 to 1889 the Tirailleurs Sénégalais wore a dark blue zouave style uniform with yellow braiding (see first photo above). This was replaced by a loose fitting dark blue tunic and trousers worn with a red sash and chechia fez. White trousers were worn in hot weather and a light khaki drill field dress was adopted in 1898. Senegalese units sent to France in 1914 wore a new dark blue uniform, introduced in June that year, beneath the standard medium-blue greatcoats of the French infantry. This changed to sky-blue in 1915 and dark khaki started to be issued the following year. Throughout these changes the distinctive yellow cuff and collar braiding was retained, together with the fez (worn with a drab cover to reduce visibility).

Until World War II the Tirailleurs Sénégalais continued to wear the khaki uniforms described above, in either heavy cloth or light drill according to conditions. In subsequent campaigns they wore the same field uniforms as other French units, usually with the dark blue forage cap of the infanterie coloniale. The red fez survived as a parade item until the 1950s.

== Filmography ==
Emitaï (1971) depicts the effects of conscription on a Diola village.

Black and White in Color (1976), by French director Jean-Jacques Annaud, 1 hour 30 minutes

Camp de Thiaroye, by Senegalese director Ousmane Sembene, 1987, 153 mins.

Le Tata, paysages de pierres, by French director Patrice Robin and Author Eveline Berruezo, 1992, 60 mins.

- Rafael Gutierrez and Dario Arce : Le Tata sénégalais de Chasselay : mémoires du 25° RTS" Documentary film, 52', 2007. Productions Chromatiques- TLM, France.

Tirailleurs (2022), by Mathieu Vadepied.

== Literature ==
At Night All Blood Is Black (French: Frère d'âme, lit. 'Soul brother') is a novel by French author David Diop. First published in French on August 16, 2018, by Éditions du Seuil, it won the Prix Goncourt des Lycéens that same year. The book centers around Alfa Ndiaye, a Senegalese Tirailleur who loses his close friend Mademba Diop while fighting in World War I. The English translation by Anna Moschovakis won the 2021 International Booker Prize. It was published in the UK by Pushkin Press and in the US by Farrar, Straus and Giroux.

The Franco-American journalist and historian Ted Morgan volunteered to serve during the Algerian War as a junior officer with the Senegalese, whom he described as highly disciplined soldiers with cheerful dispositions, serving in a corps that was full of surprises.

== See also ==
- Tirailleurs: history of the original French skirmishers of this designation plus the colonial (e.g.: Algerian, Senegalese etc.) tirailleur units
- French colonial troops
- Spahi: French colonial cavalry regiments including Senegalese units.
- Pierre Messmer
- French colonial flags
- French Colonial Empire
- List of French possessions and colonies
