= 16th Senegalese Tirailleurs Regiment =

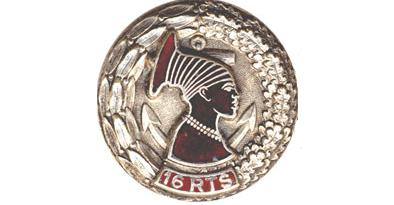
- Regimental insignia of the 16e RTS
- Active: 1919-1940, 1943-1944
- Country: France
- Branch: (France) French Army
- Type: Infantry Regiment
- Engagements: World War II: Battle of France

The 16th Senegalese Tirailleurs Regiment (16e Régiment de Tirailleurs Sénégalais, 16e RTS) was a Senegalese Tirailleurs regiment of the French Army. It saw combat in the Battle of France during World War II.

== History ==
The regiment was created in 1919 and was based in Montauban from 1922-1940. In March 1939 the unit was sent to Tarn-et-Garonne to handle the influx of refugees fleeing the nationalist victory in the Spanish Civil War.

During the German invasion of France in 1940 the 16e RTS was a component of the 4th Colonial Infantry Division (4e Division d’Infanterie Coloniale, 4e DIC). In mid-May 1940 the division held positions along the Somme River. The German 2nd Motorized Infantry Division succeeded in securing bridgeheads across the Somme in the Amiens sector, and on 23 May the 4e DIC launched a series of attacks aimed at reducing these bridgeheads. The 16e RTS attempted to retake the village of Fouilloy but was repulsed.

In June 1940 the Germans launched Fall Rot, an operation aimed at taking Paris, and crossed the Somme in force. On 9-10 June the 16e RTS attempted to hold the village of Erquinvillers. One soldier of the 4e DIC described “savage combat that lasted from 1 a.m. to 3:30 a.m... On 10 June the Germans set fire to the village, finishing off the wounding and massacring the Senegalese prisoners, leaving at least 150 dead on the field.” The German 9th Infantry Division machine-gunned dozens of tirailleurs after surrender. When a French officer, Lucien Carrat, protested the killing of black prisoners, he was told by a German officer that “an inferior race does not deserve to do battle with such a civilized race as the Germans.”

Commandant Henri Bouquet of the 24e RTS attempted to regroup remaining elements of the 16e and 24e RTS and lead a breakout attempt, but this group was captured on 10 June. Marched to a woods near Cressonsacq, German troops of the Großdeutschland Regiment separated the African troops from their white officers and NCOs. Commandant Bouquet protested and attempted to protect his troops. Captain Jean Speckel, commander of the 1st Battalion, 16e RTS, who spoke German, translated for Bouquet and declared that he was proud to have commanded such soldiers. Bouquet, Speckel, and six other white officers were executed along with 64 tirailleurs of the 16e and 24e RTS in the Bois d’Eraine Massacre.

The 16e RTS was briefly reestablished in 1943 with the aim of creating a 10th Colonial Infantry Division (10e Division d’Infanterie Coloniale, 10e DIC) to participate in the liberation of France, but the idea was abandoned and the regiment dissolved in 1944. The soldiers assigned to the 16e RTS were instead sent as replacements to reinforce the 1st Free French Division, part of the French Expeditionary Corps in Italy.
