= Charles N'Tchoréré =

French military commander

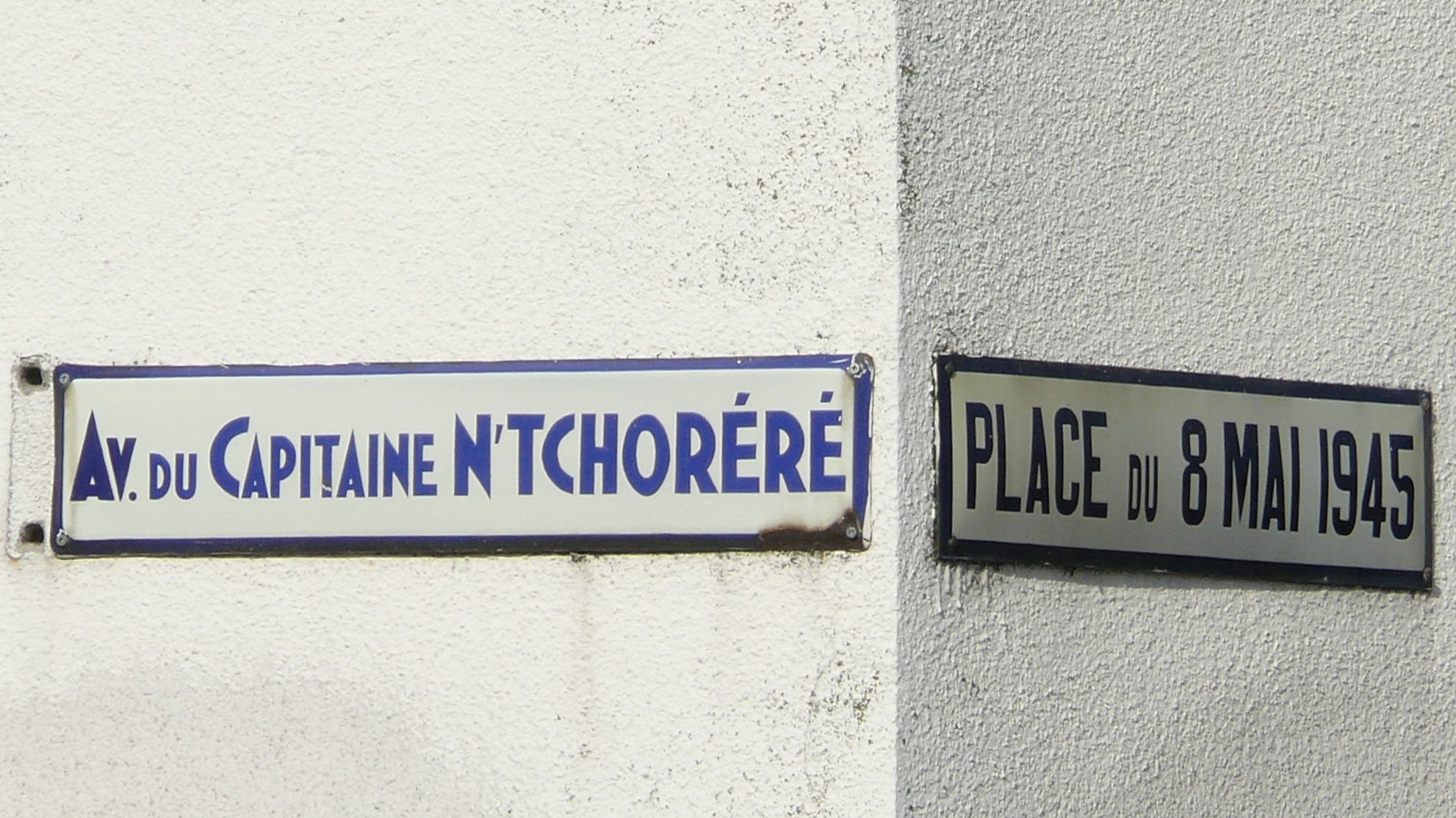
Street sign for Avenue du Capitaine N'Tchoréré in Airaines

Charles N'Tchoréré (16 November 1896 – 7 June 1940) was a Gabonese French military officer who was shot by Germans in World War II.

== Early life ==
Charles N'Tchoréré was born on 16 November 1896 in Libreville, French Gabon. The second of four children in a Mpongwe family, his father worked as an agent for a German commercial firm in German Kamerun. His parents arranged for him to be educated at the Catholic École Montfort. He performed well as a student and while he was there befriended several persons who would later become politicians, including Léon M'ba, Louis Bigmann, and Laurent Antchouey. He completed his studies in 1912. Upon the death of his mother, N'Tchoréré went to Douala to work with his father and older brother. While there he refined his English, which was used as a lingua franc in the colony. In April 1914 he, at the urging of his father, returned to Libreville.

== Military career ==
World War I broke out in 1914, leading to clashes between French and German forces at the Gabon–Kamerun border. On 19 January 1916 N'Tchoréré, despite being slightly underage, enlisted in the Tirailleurs Sénégalais. He underwent training at the Bakara military camp from then until 28 May, when he was made a secretary for a French officer in Libreville. He was promoted to the rank of sergeant the following year.

Unlike other Gabonese, N'Tchoréré remained in the military after the end of the war. Following brief service in the Rif War in Morocco, he began training at the military school in Fréjus, southern France. In 1924 he was awarded the rank of major, equivalent to a senior NCO in the French army. He subsequently served under General Maurice Gamelin in defeating an uprising in the French Mandate for Syria and the Lebanon and occupying Damascus.

Following the outbreak of World War II, N'Tchoréré, who had become an officer and had the rank of captain, spent several months in late 1939 training West African troops for combat in Europe. The following year he took command of the 53rd Regiment d'Infantrie Coloniale Mixte Sénégalais. His unit fought the Germans on the Somme River. After three days of resistance, the company was left with only ten Africans and five Europeans, and they surrendered near Amiens. The German commander refused to treat N'Tchoréré as an officer. When he refused to fall in line with the black enlisted soldiers, N'Tchoréré was shot. According to Richardot, the perpetrators were from 25th Infantry Regiment (according to Richardot, the 25th Infantry Regiment was from the 7th Panzer Division under command of Erwin Rommel but Scheck reports that Rommel's division had advanced much farther from the area. N'Tchoréré's eldest son, Jean-Baptiste, was killed in action on the lower Somme later that month.

France posthumously honored N'Tchoréré by naturalising him as a citizen in 1940. A memorial dedicated to N'Tchoréré was established in Airaines, while a statue of him was erected outside the French embassy in Libreville. In 1962 Gabon featured him on a commemorative postage stamp.

== See also ==
- Moïse Bebel, a Tirailleur officer who was also executed by German soldiers

== Works cited ==
- Akyeampong, Emmanuel Kwaku; Gates, Henry Louis, eds. (2012). Dictionary of African Biography. Vol. 4. Oxford University Press USA. ISBN 9780195382075.
- Fisher, Michael H. (2014). Migration: A World History. Oxford University Press. ISBN 9780199764341.
- David Gardinier, Historical Dictionary of Gabon 2nd ed. (The Scarecrow Press, 1994) pp. 242–243
- Louis Bigmann, Le Capitaine Charles N'Tchoréré (Abidjan: NEA, 1983)
- Christian Éboulé, Le Testament de Charles, Paris, Lettres Mouchetées, 2024, 205 p. (ISBN 978-2-487254-08-4)
