= Moïse Bebel =

French soldier

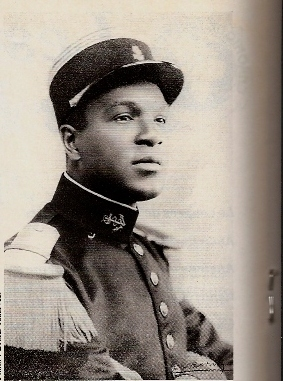
- Born: 21 May 1898; Trois-Rivières, Guadeloupe
- Died: 10 June 1940 (aged 42); Erquinvillers, France
- Military career
- Allegiance: France
- Branch: French Army
- Service years: –1940
- Rank: Captain
- Commands: 24th regiment of Senegalese skirmishers
- Conflicts: Second World War: Battle of France †

Hospice Moïse Jean Louis Victor Gilles Bebel (21 May 1898 – 10 June 1940) was a French Army officer, born in Guadeloupe, who served during the Second World War. He was executed along with his men in a massacre of tirailleurs during the Battle of France.

== Life ==
Born in 1898 in Trois-Rivières, Guadeloupe, Bebel aspired to be a soldier from a young age. He graduated from the Saint-Maxient non-commissioned officer school and quickly rose through the ranks, from second lieutenant to captain. By the time of the Second World War, Bebel was an acting commandant in the 24th regiment of Senegalese skirmishers. He fought in the Battle of France and was taken prisoner on 9 June 1940 while fighting near Erquinvillers. The following day, Bebel was executed by German soldiers along with fifty of his men, becoming one of the 150 tirailleurs massacred in Erquinvillers and its surrounding villages between 9 and 10 June. The murder of Bebel and his men has been compared to the death of fellow tirailleur Charles N'Tchoréré.

Bebel's remains, as well as those of several other Guadeloupean soldiers, were repatriated to Guadeloupe in 1950, with large numbers of people arriving to honor them. In 2016, on the 76th anniversary of his death, Bebel was honored in a ceremony. The main square of Trois-Rivières is named after him.
