= Fouilloy, Somme =

Fouilloy
- Commune
- Centre-ville

- Coat of arms
- Location of Fouilloy
- Location within France Location within Hauts-de-France
- Coordinates: 49°54′01″N 2°30′16″E
- Country: France
- Region: Hauts-de-France
- Department: Somme
- Arrondissement: Amiens
- Canton: Corbie
- Intercommunality: Val de Somme

Government
  - Mayor (2020–2026): Yves Ducrocq
- Area^{1}: 5.73 km^{2} (2.21 sq mi)
- Elevation: 34 m (112 ft)
- Highest elevation: 98 m (322 ft)
- Lowest elevation: 28 m (92 ft)
- Population (2023): 1,723
  - Density: 301/km^{2} (779/sq mi)
- Time zone: UTC+01:00 (CET)
  - Summer (DST): UTC+02:00 (CEST)
- INSEE/Postal code: 80338 /80800
- ^{1} French Land Register data, which excludes lakes, ponds, glaciers > 1 km^{2} (0.386 sq mi or 247 acres) and river estuaries.

Fouilloy (French pronunciation: [fujwa]; Picard: Fouilloé ) is a commune in the Somme department in Hauts-de-France in northern France.

== Geography ==
Fouilloy is situated on the banks of the river Somme, at the junction of the D1 and D23 roads, some 10 miles (16 km) east of Amiens.

== Population ==
Historical population
Year	Pop.	±% p.a.
1968	1,391	—
1975	1,743	+3.28%
1982	1,658	−0.71%
1990	1,627	−0.24%
1999	1,734	+0.71%
2007	1,812	+0.55%
2012	1,882	+0.76%
2017	1,837	−0.48%
2023	1,723	−1.06%
Source: INSEE

== See also ==
- Communes of the Somme department
