= Lieuvillers =

- Commune
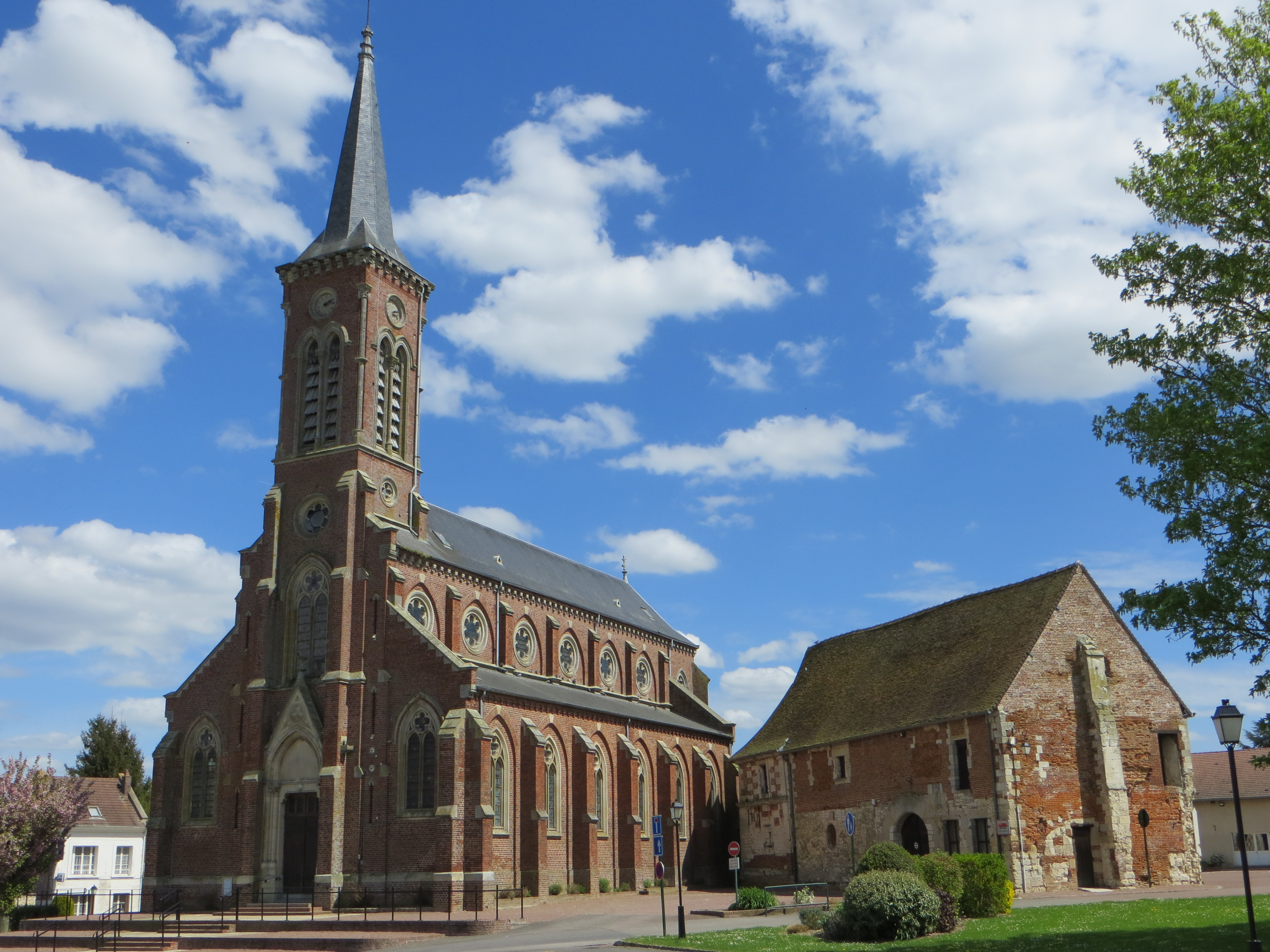
- The church in Lieuvillers
- Location of Lieuvillers
- Location within France Location within Hauts-de-France
- Coordinates: 49°28′15″N 2°29′47″E
- Country: France
- Region: Hauts-de-France
- Department: Oise
- Arrondissement: Clermont
- Canton: Saint-Just-en-Chaussée
- Intercommunality: Plateau Picard

Government
  - Mayor (2020–2026): Michaël Negi
- Area^{1}: 9.41 km^{2} (3.63 sq mi)
- Elevation: 122 m (400 ft)
- Highest elevation: 159 m (522 ft)
- Lowest elevation: 92 m (302 ft)
- Population (2023): 718
  - Density: 76.3/km^{2} (198/sq mi)
- Time zone: UTC+01:00 (CET)
  - Summer (DST): UTC+02:00 (CEST)
- INSEE/Postal code: 60364 /60130
- ^{1} French Land Register data, which excludes lakes, ponds, glaciers > 1 km^{2} (0.386 sq mi or 247 acres) and river estuaries.

Lieuvillers (French pronunciation: [ljøvile]) is a commune in the Oise department in northern France.

== See also ==
- Communes of the Oise department
