= Angivillers =

- Commune
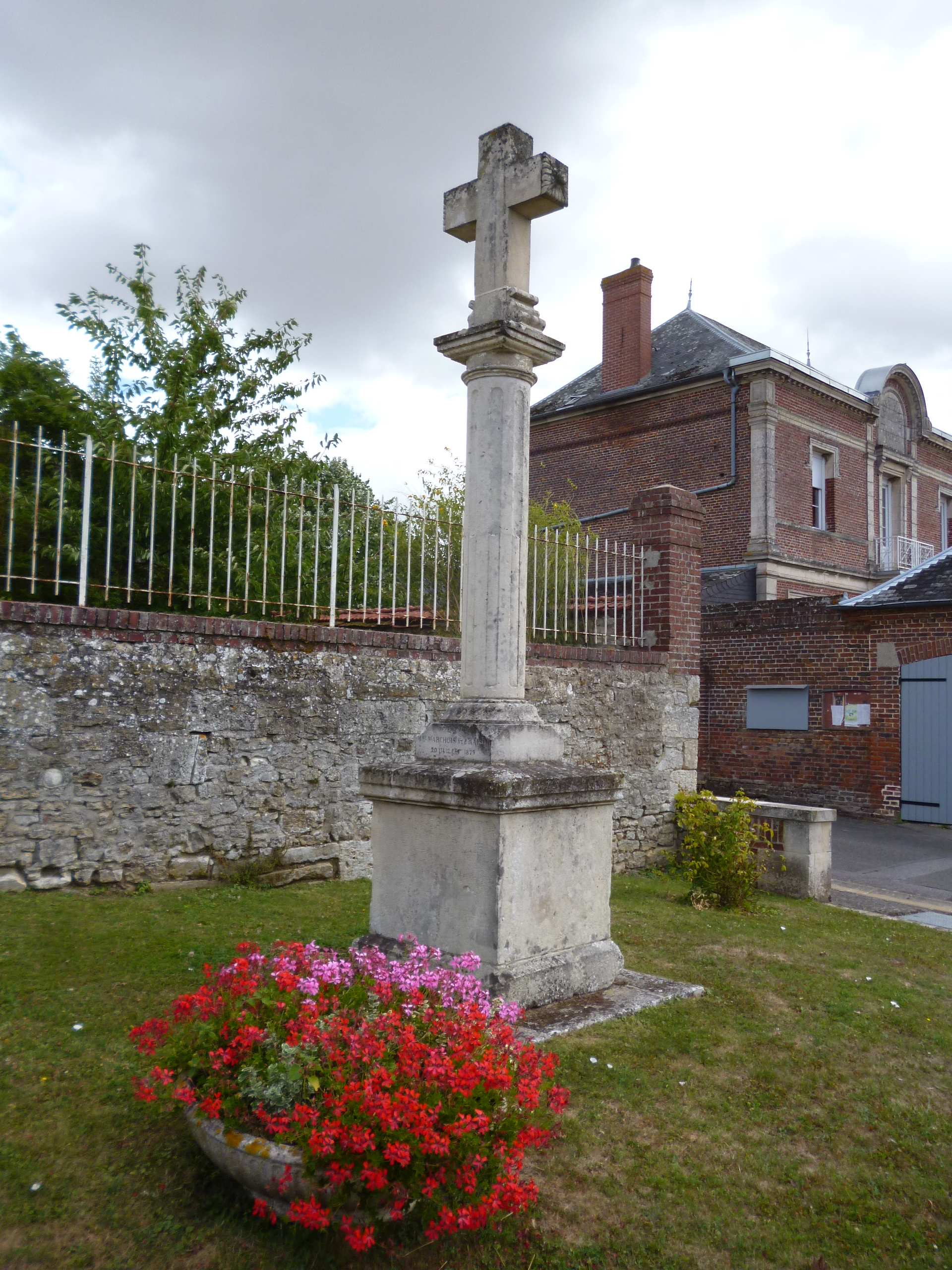
- The cross with the town hall in the background
- Location of Angivillers
- Location within France Location within Hauts-de-France
- Coordinates: 49°29′13″N 2°30′08″E
- Country: France
- Region: Hauts-de-France
- Department: Oise
- Arrondissement: Clermont
- Canton: Saint-Just-en-Chaussée
- Intercommunality: Plateau Picard

Government
  - Mayor (2020–2026): Élisabeth Van de Weghe
- Area^{1}: 6.27 km^{2} (2.42 sq mi)
- Elevation: 118 m (387 ft)
- Highest elevation: 151 m (495 ft)
- Lowest elevation: 99 m (325 ft)
- Population (2023): 155
  - Density: 24.7/km^{2} (64.0/sq mi)
- Time zone: UTC+01:00 (CET)
  - Summer (DST): UTC+02:00 (CEST)
- INSEE/Postal code: 60014 /60130
- ^{1} French Land Register data, which excludes lakes, ponds, glaciers > 1 km^{2} (0.386 sq mi or 247 acres) and river estuaries.

Angivillers is a commune in the Oise department in northern France.

== Population ==
Historical population
Year	Pop.	±% p.a.
1968	178	—
1975	156	−1.87%
1982	159	+0.27%
1990	181	+1.63%
1999	200	+1.12%
2007	191	−0.57%
2012	175	−1.73%
2017	185	+1.12%
2023	155	−2.91%
Source: INSEE

== See also ==
- Communes of the Oise department
