= Aubigny, Somme =

Aubigny
- Commune
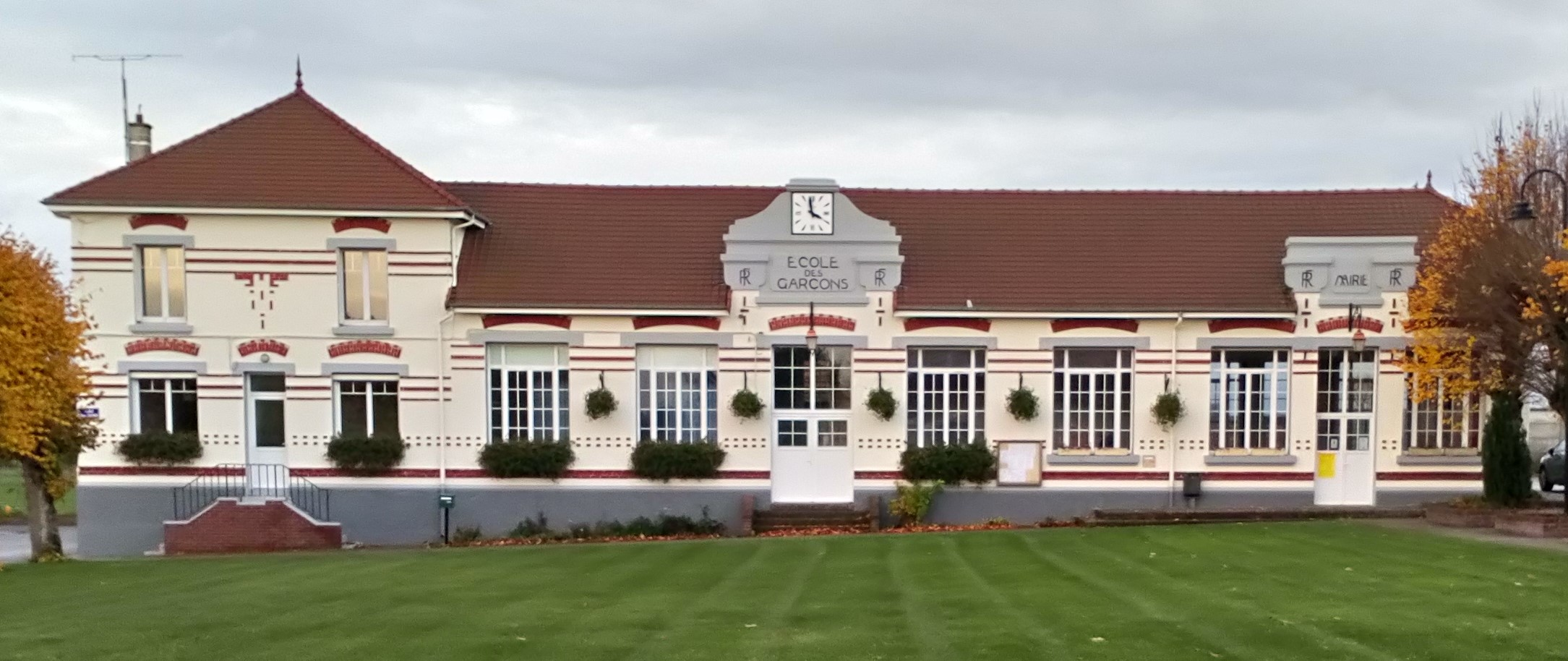
- The town hall and school

- Coat of arms
- Location of Aubigny
- Location within France Location within Hauts-de-France
- Coordinates: 49°54′04″N 2°28′59″E
- Country: France
- Region: Hauts-de-France
- Department: Somme
- Arrondissement: Amiens
- Canton: Amiens-3
- Intercommunality: CC Val Somme

Government
  - Mayor (2020–2026): Georges Leclercq
- Area^{1}: 9.75 km^{2} (3.76 sq mi)
- Elevation: 34 m (112 ft)
- Highest elevation: 90 m (300 ft)
- Lowest elevation: 22 m (72 ft)
- Population (2023): 502
  - Density: 51.5/km^{2} (133/sq mi)
- Time zone: UTC+01:00 (CET)
  - Summer (DST): UTC+02:00 (CEST)
- INSEE/Postal code: 80036 /80800
- ^{1} French Land Register data, which excludes lakes, ponds, glaciers > 1 km^{2} (0.386 sq mi or 247 acres) and river estuaries.

Aubigny (French pronunciation: [obiɲi]; Picard: Aubignin) is a commune in the Somme department in Hauts-de-France in northern France.

== Demography ==
Historical population
Year	Pop.	±% p.a.
1968	399	—
1975	455	+1.89%
1982	527	+2.12%
1990	539	+0.28%
1999	536	−0.06%
2007	524	−0.28%
2012	450	−3.00%
2017	505	+2.33%
2023	502	−0.10%
Source: INSEE

== Places and monuments ==
- Church Sainte-Colombe (1821).
- British Cemetery
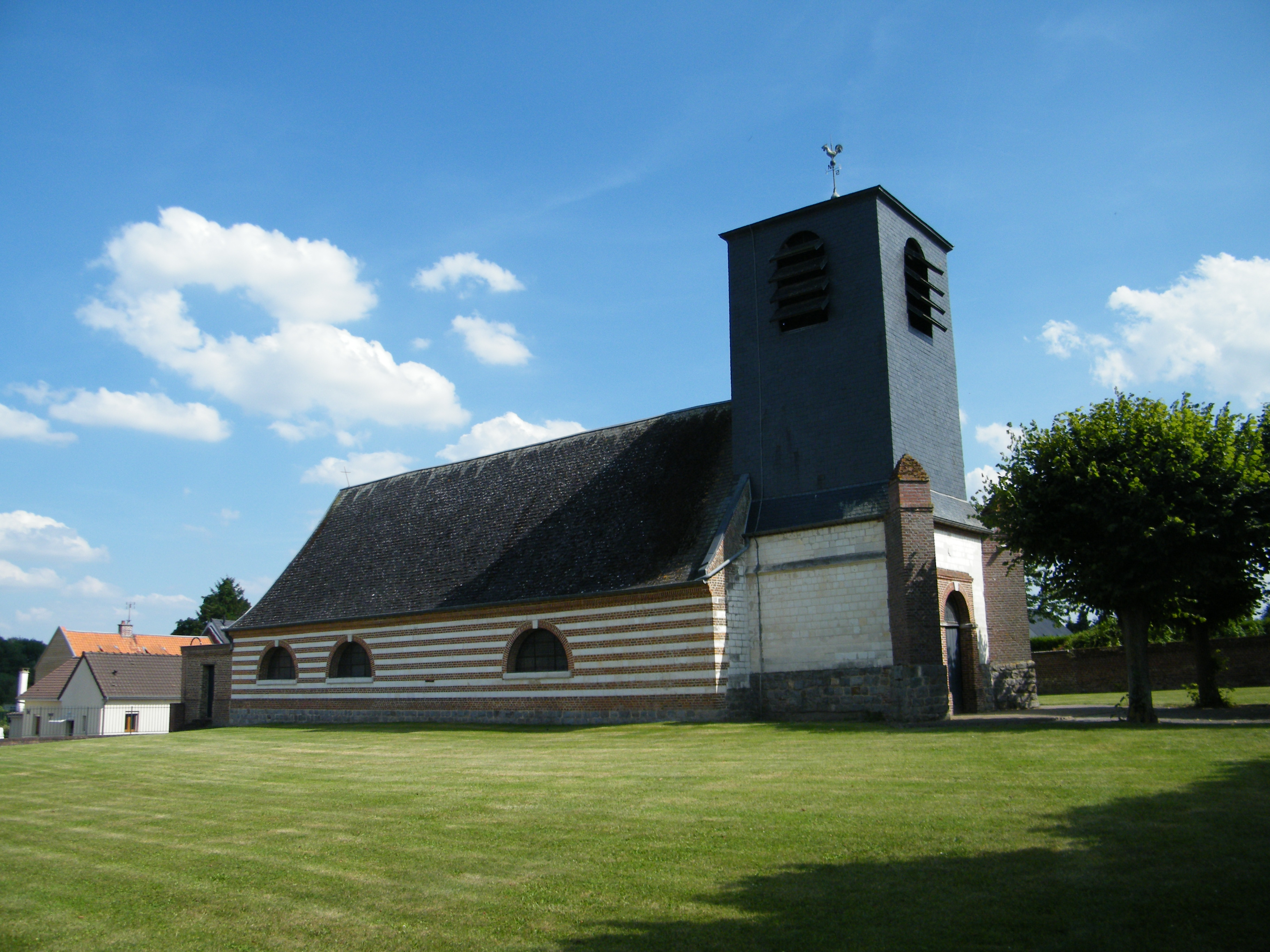
Church Sainte-Colombe.

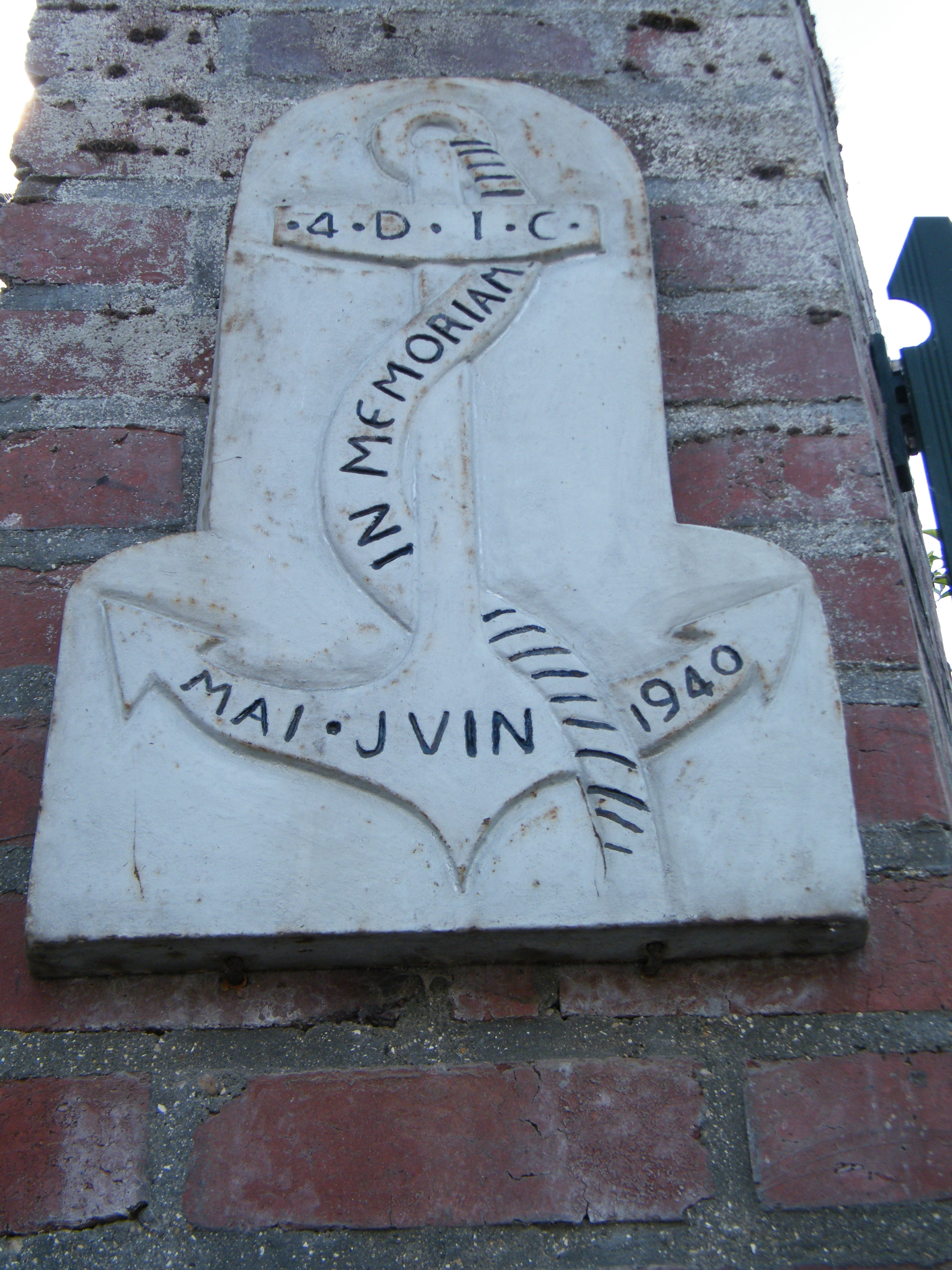
Cemetery entrance.

== Sport and Leisure ==
In Aubigny, teams are playing balle à la main which is a traditional sport in Picardy.

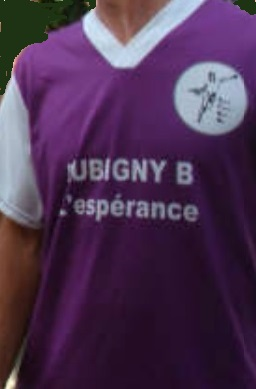
shirt of the team of Aubigny

== See also ==
- Communes of the Somme department
