= Cressonsacq =

- Commune
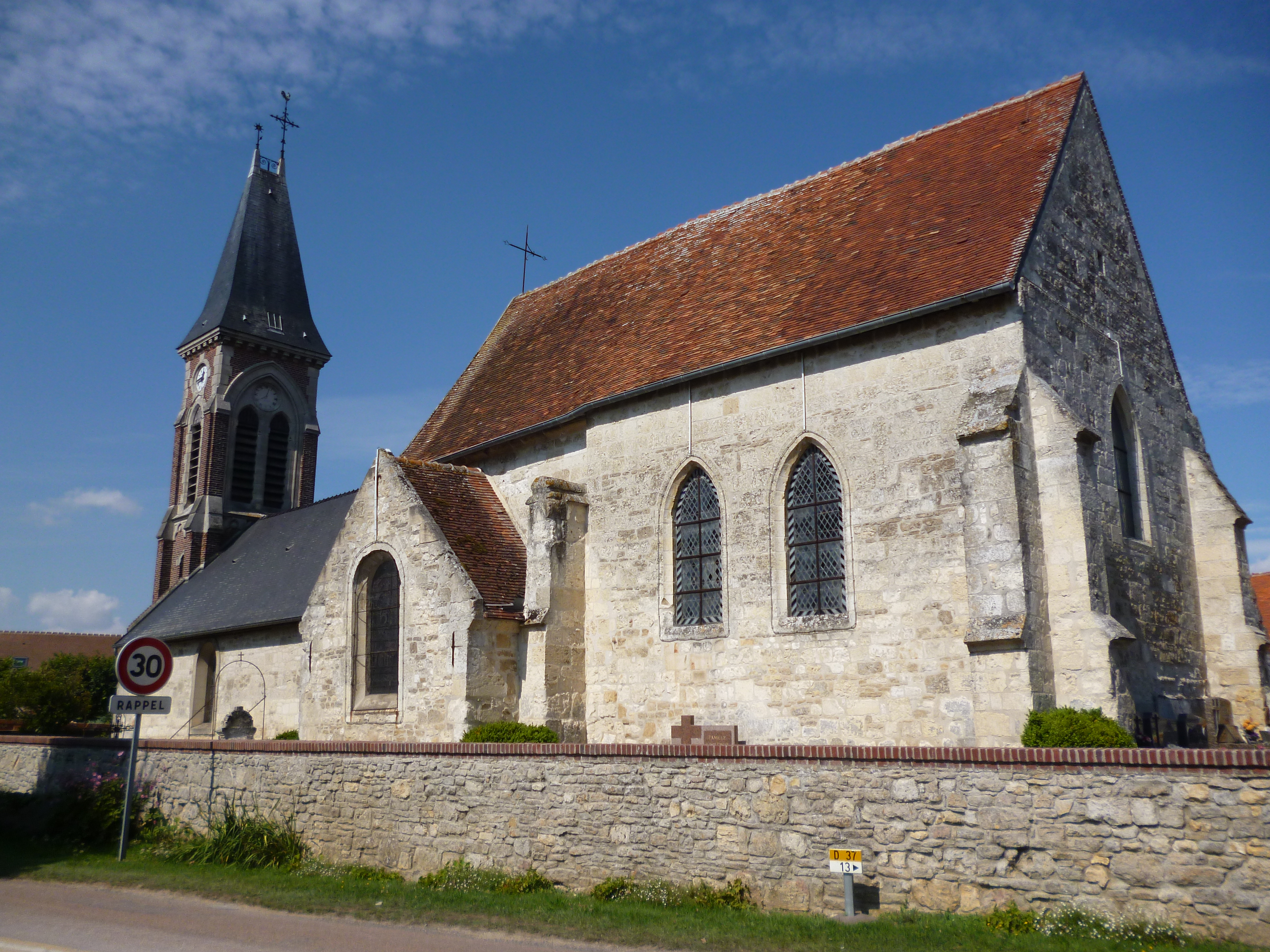
- The church in Cressonsacq
- Location of Cressonsacq
- Location within France Location within Hauts-de-France
- Coordinates: 49°27′29″N 2°34′02″E
- Country: France
- Region: Hauts-de-France
- Department: Oise
- Arrondissement: Clermont
- Canton: Estrées-Saint-Denis
- Intercommunality: Plateau Picard

Government
  - Mayor (2020–2026): Hubert Doisy
- Area^{1}: 6.53 km^{2} (2.52 sq mi)
- Elevation: 90 m (300 ft)
- Highest elevation: 130 m (430 ft)
- Lowest elevation: 81 m (266 ft)
- Population (2023): 435
  - Density: 66.6/km^{2} (173/sq mi)
- Time zone: UTC+01:00 (CET)
  - Summer (DST): UTC+02:00 (CEST)
- INSEE/Postal code: 60177 /60190
- ^{1} French Land Register data, which excludes lakes, ponds, glaciers > 1 km^{2} (0.386 sq mi or 247 acres) and river estuaries.

Cressonsacq (French pronunciation: [kʁɛsɔ̃sak]) is a commune in the Oise department in northern France.

== See also ==
- Communes of the Oise department
