= Erquinvillers =

- Commune
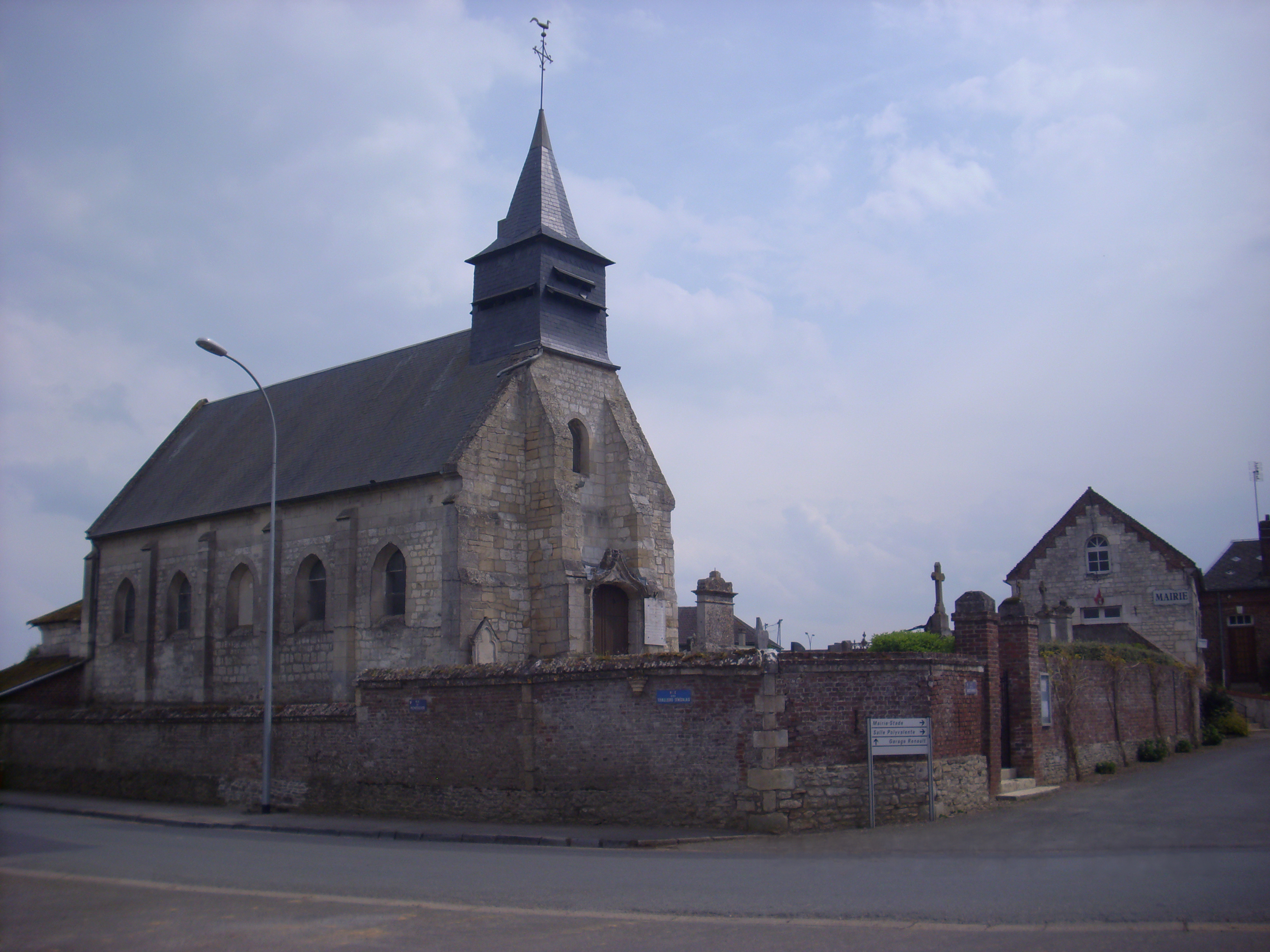
- The town hall and church in Erquinvillers
- Location of Erquinvillers
- Location within France Location within Hauts-de-France
- Coordinates: 49°27′33″N 2°28′44″E
- Country: France
- Region: Hauts-de-France
- Department: Oise
- Arrondissement: Clermont
- Canton: Saint-Just-en-Chaussée
- Intercommunality: Plateau Picard

Government
  - Mayor (2020–2026): Jean-Michel Hoedt
- Area^{1}: 3.77 km^{2} (1.46 sq mi)
- Elevation: 120 m (390 ft)
- Highest elevation: 137 m (449 ft)
- Lowest elevation: 102 m (335 ft)
- Population (2023): 185
  - Density: 49.1/km^{2} (127/sq mi)
- Time zone: UTC+01:00 (CET)
  - Summer (DST): UTC+02:00 (CEST)
- INSEE/Postal code: 60216 /60130
- ^{1} French Land Register data, which excludes lakes, ponds, glaciers > 1 km^{2} (0.386 sq mi or 247 acres) and river estuaries.

Erquinvillers (French pronunciation: [ɛʁkɛ̃vile]) is a commune in the Oise department in northern France.

== See also ==
- Communes of the Oise department
