= Canton of Bernaville =

Coordinates: 50°7′56″N 2°9′52″E

Bernaville
- Former canton
- Interactive map of Bernaville
- Country: France
- Region: Hauts-de-France
- Department: Somme
- No. of communes: {{{nbcomm}}}
- Disbanded: 2015
- Area: 166.47 km^{2} (64.27 sq mi)
- Population (2012): 5,631
  - Density: 33.83/km^{2} (87.61/sq mi)

The Canton of Bernaville is a former canton situated in the department of the Somme and in the Picardy region of northern France. It was disbanded following the French canton reorganisation which came into effect in March 2015. It consisted of 24 communes, which joined the canton of Doullens in 2015. It had 5,631 inhabitants (2012).

== Geography ==
The canton is organised around the commune of Bernaville in the arrondissement of Amiens. The altitude varies from 35m at Béalcourt to 167m at Fienvillers for an average of 111m.

The canton comprised 24 communes:

- Agenville
- Autheux
- Barly
- Béalcourt
- Beaumetz
- Bernâtre
- Bernaville
- Boisbergues
- Candas
- Domesmont
- Épécamps
- Fienvillers
- Frohen-sur-Authie
- Gorges
- Heuzecourt
- Maizicourt
- Le Meillard
- Mézerolles
- Montigny-les-Jongleurs
- Occoches
- Outrebois
- Prouville
- Remaisnil
- Saint-Acheul

== Population ==
1962	1968	1975	1982	1990	1999
5076	5399	5286	4945	4757	4874
Census count starting from 1962 : Population without double counting

== See also ==
- Arrondissements of the Somme department
- Cantons of the Somme department
- Communes of the Somme department
