= Communauté de communes du Bernavillois =

Coordinates: 50.1325°N 2.1651°E

Bernavillois
- Former communauté de communes
- Interactive map of Bernavillois
- Country: France
- Region: Hauts-de-France
- Department: Somme
- No. of communes: {{{nbcomm}}}
- Disbanded: 2017

The communauté de communes du Bernavillois is a former communauté de communes in the Somme département and in the Picardie region of France. It was created in December 1999. It was merged into the new Communauté de communes du Territoire Nord Picardie in January 2017.

== Composition ==
This Communauté de communes comprised 26 communes:

1. Agenville
2. Autheux
3. Béalcourt
4. Beaumetz
5. Bernâtre
6. Bernaville
7. Berneuil
8. Boisbergues
9. Bonneville
10. Candas
11. Conteville
12. Domesmont
13. Domléger-Longvillers
14. Épécamps
15. Fieffes-Montrelet
16. Fienvillers
17. Frohen-sur-Authie
18. Gorges
19. Heuzecourt
20. Hiermont
21. Le Meillard
22. Maizicourt
23. Mézerolles
24. Montigny-les-Jongleurs
25. Prouville
26. Saint-Acheul

== See also ==
- Communes of the Somme department
