= Communauté de communes du Doullennais =

Coordinates: 50.1578°N 2.3393°E

Doullennais
- Former communauté de communes
- Interactive map of Doullennais
- Country: France
- Region: Hauts-de-France
- Department: Somme
- No. of communes: {{{nbcomm}}}
- Established: 24 December 1992
- Disbanded: 2017

The Communauté de communes du Doullennais is a former communauté de communes in the Somme département and in the Picardie région of France. It was created in December 1992. It was merged into the new Communauté de communes du Territoire Nord Picardie in January 2017.

== Composition ==
This Communauté de communes comprised 18 communes:

1. Authieule
2. Barly
3. Beauquesne
4. Beauval
5. Bouquemaison
6. Brévillers
7. Doullens
8. Gézaincourt
9. Grouches-Luchuel
10. Hem-Hardinval
11. Humbercourt
12. Longuevillette
13. Lucheux
14. Neuvillette
15. Occoches
16. Outrebois
17. Remaisnil
18. Terramesnil

== See also ==
- Communes of the Somme department
