= Communauté de communes du Territoire Nord Picardie =

Federation of municipalities in France

Territoire Nord Picardie
- Communauté de communes
- Interactive map of Territoire Nord Picardie
- Coordinates: 50°10′N 02°21′E
- Country: France
- Region: Hauts-de-France
- Department: Somme
- No. of communes: {{{nbcomm}}}
- Established: 2017
- Area: 537.7 km^{2} (207.6 sq mi)
- Population (2019): 31,096
  - Density: 57.83/km^{2} (149.8/sq mi)

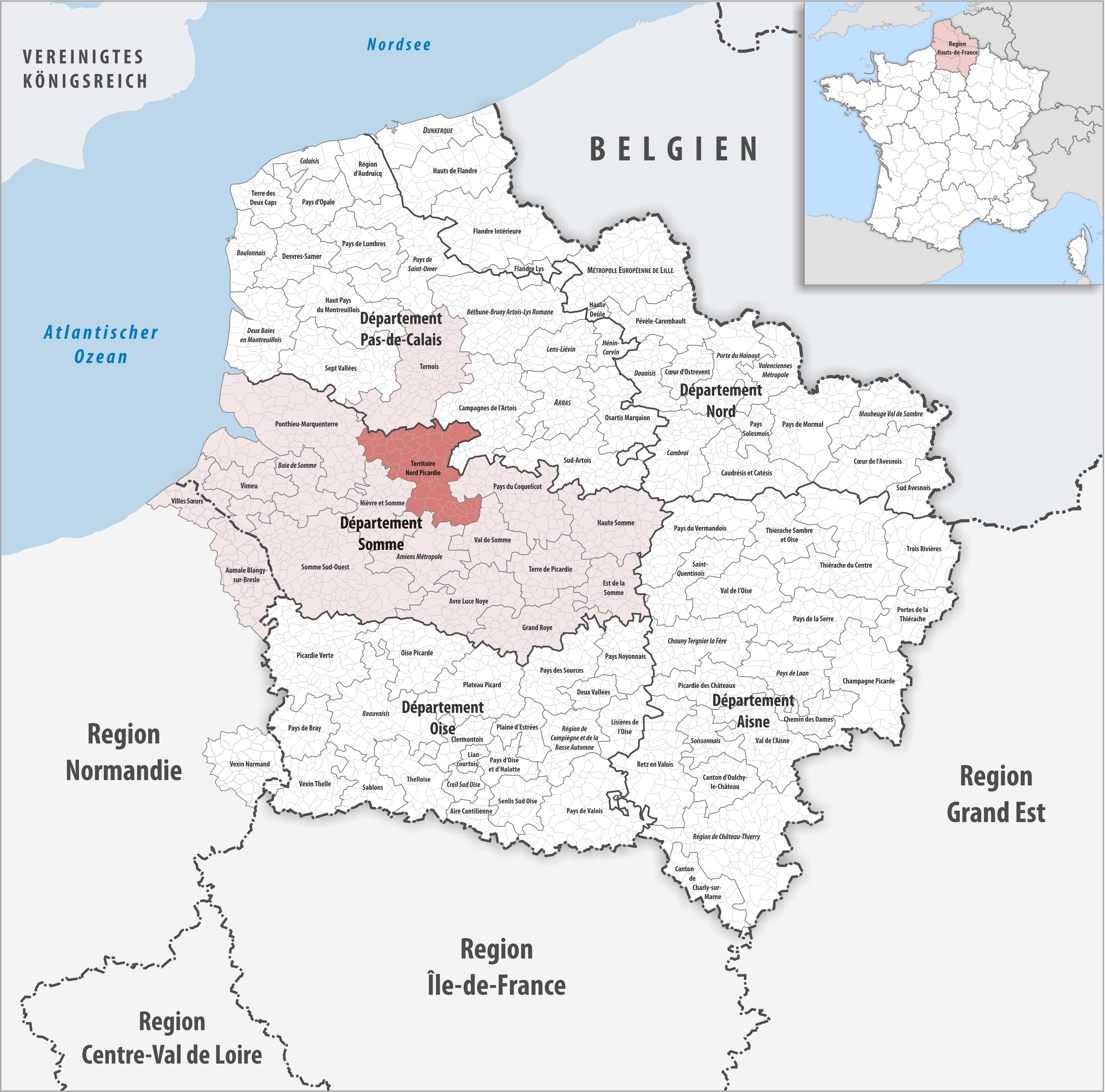

The Communauté de communes du Territoire Nord Picardie is a communauté de communes in the Somme département and in the Hauts-de-France région of France. It was formed on 1 January 2017 by the merger of the former Communauté de communes du Bernavillois, the Communauté de communes du Bocage et de l'Hallue and the Communauté de communes du Doullennais. On 1 January 2018 it lost 5 communes to the Communauté d'agglomération Amiens Métropole and the Communauté de communes du Val de Somme. It consists of 65 communes, and its seat is in Doullens. Its area is 537.7 km^{2}, and its population was 31,096 in 2019.

== Composition ==
The communauté de communes consists of the following 65 communes:

1. Agenville
2. Autheux
3. Authieule
4. Barly
5. Bavelincourt
6. Béalcourt
7. Beaucourt-sur-l'Hallue
8. Beaumetz
9. Beauquesne
10. Beauval
11. Béhencourt
12. Bernâtre
13. Bernaville
14. Berneuil
15. Boisbergues
16. Bonneville
17. Bouquemaison
18. Brévillers
19. Candas
20. Coisy
21. Contay
22. Conteville
23. Domesmont
24. Domléger-Longvillers
25. Doullens
26. Épécamps
27. Fieffes-Montrelet
28. Fienvillers
29. Flesselles
30. Fréchencourt
31. Frohen-sur-Authie
32. Gézaincourt
33. Gorges
34. Grouches-Luchuel
35. Hem-Hardinval
36. Heuzecourt
37. Hiermont
38. Humbercourt
39. Longuevillette
40. Lucheux
41. Maizicourt
42. Le Meillard
43. Mézerolles
44. Mirvaux
45. Molliens-au-Bois
46. Montigny-les-Jongleurs
47. Montigny-sur-l'Hallue
48. Montonvillers
49. Naours
50. Neuvillette
51. Occoches
52. Outrebois
53. Pierregot
54. Prouville
55. Rainneville
56. Remaisnil
57. Rubempré
58. Saint-Acheul
59. Saint-Gratien
60. Talmas
61. Terramesnil
62. Vadencourt
63. La Vicogne
64. Villers-Bocage
65. Wargnies
