= Beauquesne =

- Commune
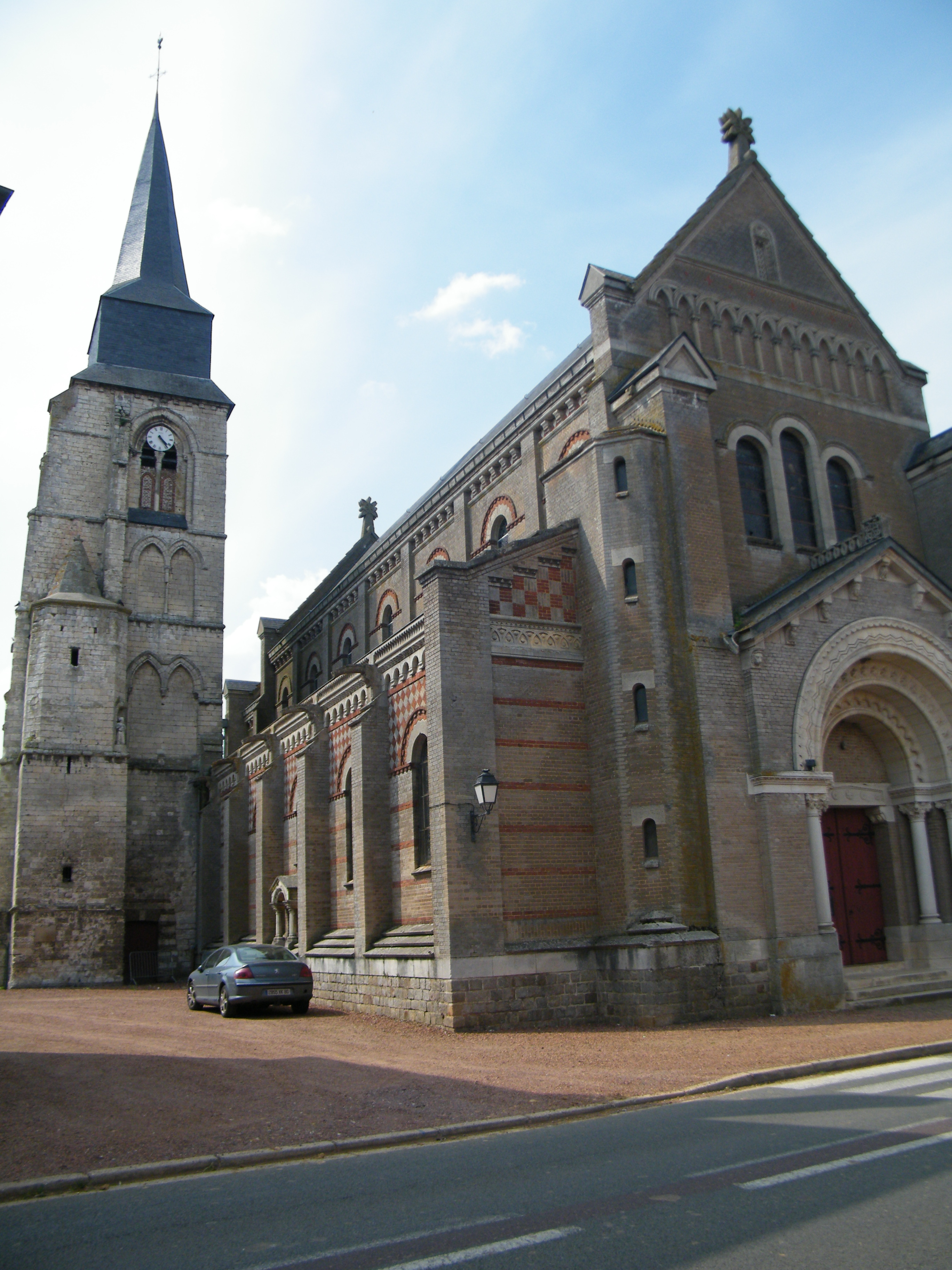
- The church in Beauquesne

- Coat of arms
- Location of Beauquesne
- Location within France Location within Hauts-de-France
- Coordinates: 50°05′07″N 2°23′33″E
- Country: France
- Region: Hauts-de-France
- Department: Somme
- Arrondissement: Amiens
- Canton: Doullens
- Intercommunality: CC Territoire Nord Picardie

Government
  - Mayor (2020–2026): François Durieux
- Area^{1}: 20.04 km^{2} (7.74 sq mi)
- Elevation: 144 m (472 ft)
- Highest elevation: 164 m (538 ft)
- Lowest elevation: 98 m (322 ft)
- Population (2023): 1,352
  - Density: 67.47/km^{2} (174.7/sq mi)
- Time zone: UTC+01:00 (CET)
  - Summer (DST): UTC+02:00 (CEST)
- INSEE/Postal code: 80070 /80600
- ^{1} French Land Register data, which excludes lakes, ponds, glaciers > 1 km^{2} (0.386 sq mi or 247 acres) and river estuaries.

Beauquesne (French pronunciation: [bokɛn]) is a commune in the Somme department in Hauts-de-France in northern France. The name comes from the Picard for the oak tree, "quesne".

== Geography ==
Situated at the junction of the D23 and the D31 roads, 17 miles to the north of Amiens

== Population ==
Historical population
| Year | Pop. | ±% p.a. |
|---|---|---|
| 1968 | 1,265 | — |
| 1975 | 1,194 | −0.82% |
| 1982 | 1,139 | −0.67% |
| 1990 | 1,147 | +0.09% |
| 1999 | 1,176 | +0.28% |
| 2007 | 1,281 | +1.07% |
| 2012 | 1,357 | +1.16% |
| 2017 | 1,339 | −0.27% |
| 2023 | 1,352 | +0.16% |
Source: INSEE

== See also ==
- Communes of the Somme department
