= Brévillers, Somme =

Brévillers
- Commune
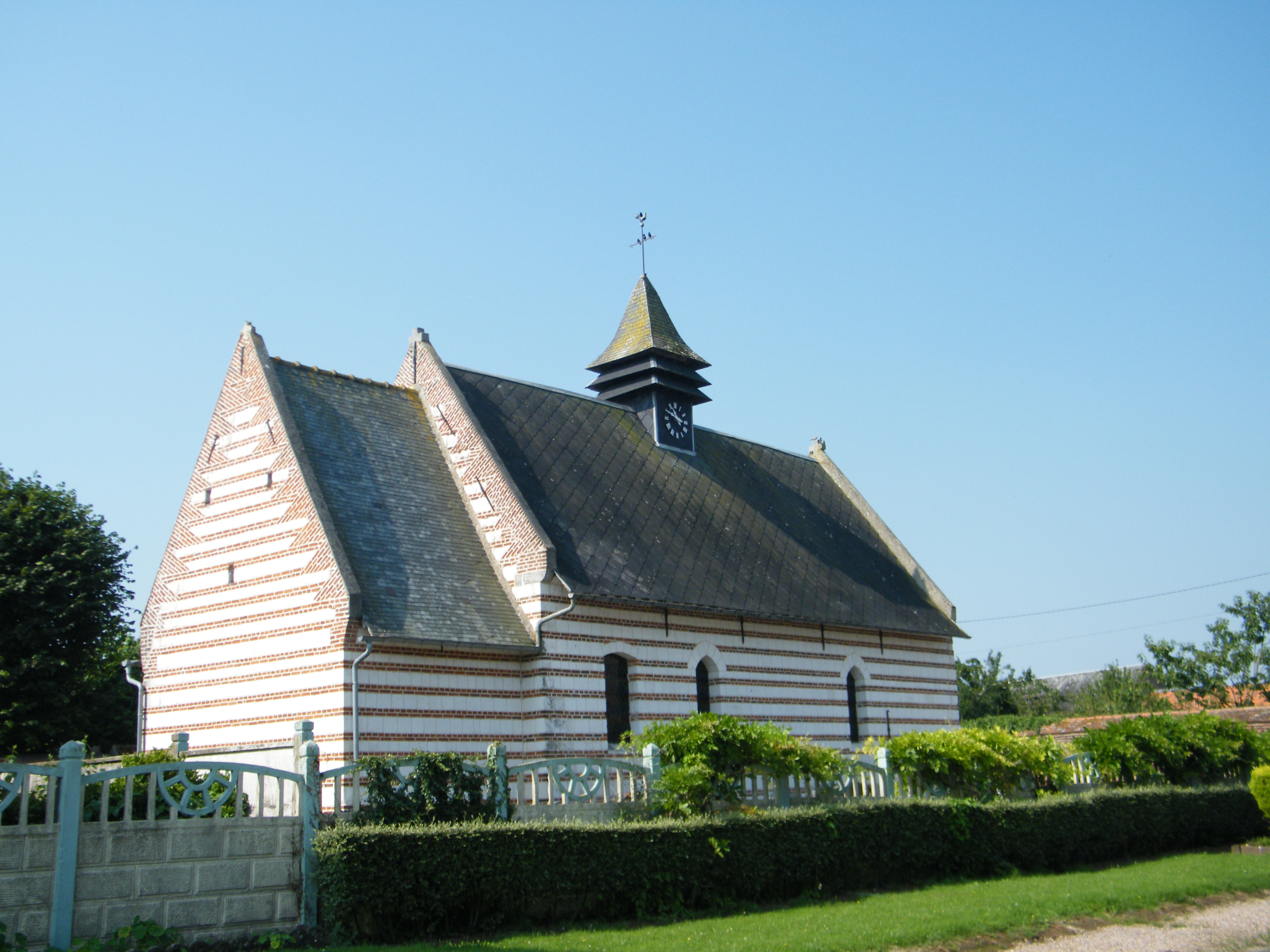
- The church in Brévillers

- Coat of arms
- Location of Brévillers
- Location within France Location within Hauts-de-France
- Coordinates: 50°12′57″N 2°22′43″E
- Country: France
- Region: Hauts-de-France
- Department: Somme
- Arrondissement: Amiens
- Canton: Doullens
- Intercommunality: CC Territoire Nord Picardie

Government
  - Mayor (2020–2026): Vanessa Debonne
- Area^{1}: 1.83 km^{2} (0.71 sq mi)
- Elevation: 156 m (512 ft)
- Highest elevation: 156 m (512 ft)
- Lowest elevation: 130 m (430 ft)
- Population (2023): 116
  - Density: 63.4/km^{2} (164/sq mi)
- Time zone: UTC+01:00 (CET)
  - Summer (DST): UTC+02:00 (CEST)
- INSEE/Postal code: 80140 /80600
- ^{1} French Land Register data, which excludes lakes, ponds, glaciers > 1 km^{2} (0.386 sq mi or 247 acres) and river estuaries.

Brévillers is a commune in the Somme department in Hauts-de-France in northern France.

== Geography ==
The commune is situated on the D200 road, some 20 miles (32 km) southwest of Arras.

== Population ==
Historical population
Year	Pop.	±% p.a.
1968	60	—
1975	52	−2.02%
1982	63	+2.78%
1990	74	+2.03%
1999	87	+1.81%
2007	102	+2.01%
2012	104	+0.39%
2017	108	+0.76%
2023	116	+1.20%
Source: INSEE

== See also ==
- Communes of the Somme department
