= Bernaville =

- Commune
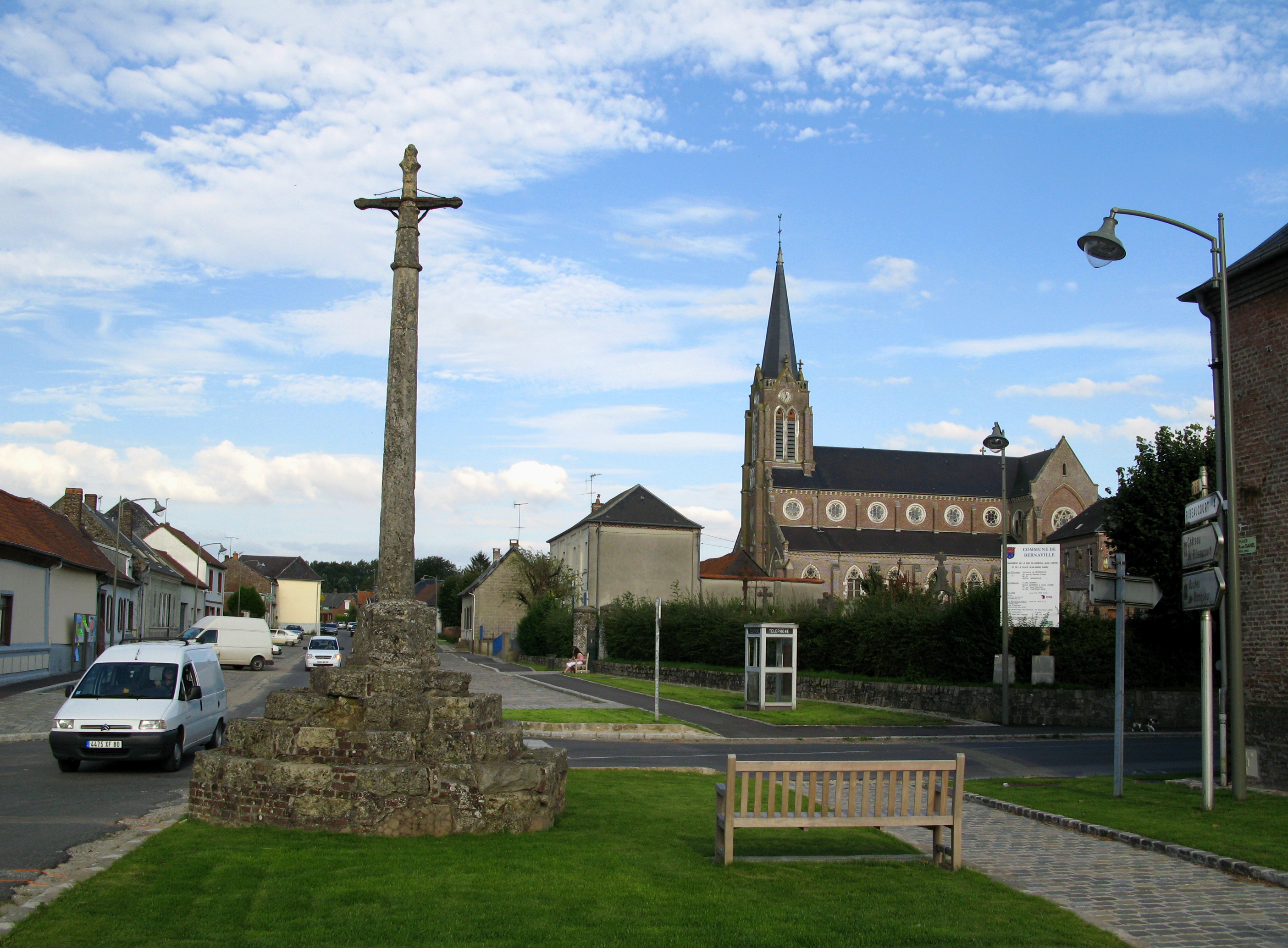
- The cross and church in Bernaville

- Coat of arms
- Location of Bernaville
- Location within France Location within Hauts-de-France
- Coordinates: 50°07′55″N 2°09′50″E
- Country: France
- Region: Hauts-de-France
- Department: Somme
- Arrondissement: Amiens
- Canton: Doullens
- Intercommunality: CC Territoire Nord Picardie

Government
  - Mayor (2020–2026): Christelle Leclercq
- Area^{1}: 17.34 km^{2} (6.70 sq mi)
- Elevation: 152 m (499 ft)
- Highest elevation: 158 m (518 ft)
- Lowest elevation: 94 m (308 ft)
- Population (2023): 1,042
  - Density: 60.09/km^{2} (155.6/sq mi)
- Time zone: UTC+01:00 (CET)
  - Summer (DST): UTC+02:00 (CEST)
- INSEE/Postal code: 80086 /80370
- ^{1} French Land Register data, which excludes lakes, ponds, glaciers > 1 km^{2} (0.386 sq mi or 247 acres) and river estuaries.

Bernaville (French pronunciation: [bɛʁnavil]) is a commune in the Somme department in Hauts-de-France in northern France.

== Geography ==
Bernaville is situated on the D925 road, some 18 miles (29 km) east of Abbeville. It is surrounded by the communes Domesmont, Beaumetz and Gorges.

== Population ==
Historical population
Year	Pop.	±% p.a.
1968	871	—
1975	960	+1.40%
1982	951	−0.13%
1990	910	−0.55%
1999	996	+1.01%
2007	1,079	+1.01%
2012	1,106	+0.50%
2017	1,070	−0.66%
2023	1,042	−0.44%
Source: INSEE

== See also ==
- Communes of the Somme department
