= Lucheux =

- Commune
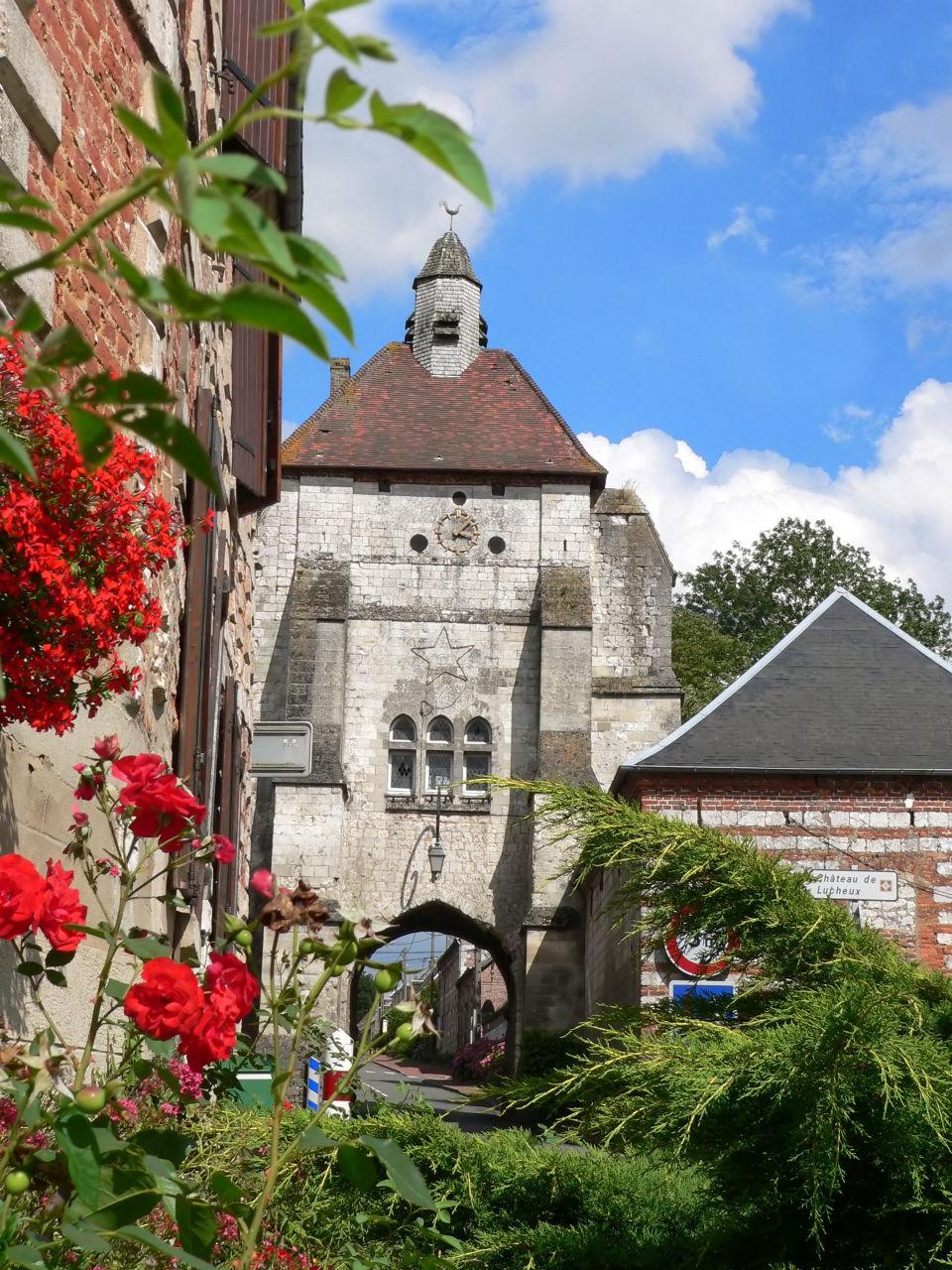
- The belfry of Lucheux is a former city gate tower

- Coat of arms
- Location of Lucheux
- Location within France Location within Hauts-de-France
- Coordinates: 50°12′00″N 2°25′00″E
- Country: France
- Region: Hauts-de-France
- Department: Somme
- Arrondissement: Amiens
- Canton: Doullens
- Intercommunality: CC Territoire Nord Picardie

Government
  - Mayor (2020–2026): Michel Duhautoy
- Area^{1}: 27.65 km^{2} (10.68 sq mi)
- Elevation: 87 m (285 ft)
- Highest elevation: 174 m (571 ft)
- Lowest elevation: 70 m (230 ft)
- Population (2023): 521
  - Density: 18.8/km^{2} (48.8/sq mi)
- Time zone: UTC+01:00 (CET)
  - Summer (DST): UTC+02:00 (CEST)
- INSEE/Postal code: 80495 /80600
- ^{1} French Land Register data, which excludes lakes, ponds, glaciers > 1 km^{2} (0.386 sq mi or 247 acres) and river estuaries.

Lucheux (French pronunciation: [lyʃø]) is a commune in the Somme department in Hauts-de-France in northern France.

== Geography ==
Lucheux is situated on the D5 road, some 18 miles (29 km) southwest of Arras, near the border with the neighbouring département of the Pas-de-Calais.

== Population ==
Historical population
Year	Pop.	±% p.a.
1968	543	—
1975	513	−0.81%
1982	553	+1.08%
1990	607	+1.17%
1999	568	−0.74%
2007	591	+0.50%
2012	577	−0.48%
2017	534	−1.54%
2023	521	−0.41%
Source: INSEE

== History ==
The château was taken by the Protestants under Captain Cocqueville in 1568 during the Wars of Religion. Laid to siege and taken again in 1595 during the same wars, this time by the Spanish under Hernando Teillo de Porto Carrer.

== Places of interest ==
Lucheux is a medieval town with many remarkable monuments:

- The belfry, listed as an historic monument in 1896 and a UNESCO World Heritage Site in 2005 (as part of a group of Belfries of Belgium and France) because of its architecture and historical importance in civic affairs.
- The fifteenth-century château.

Dominating the town on the road leading north to Avesnes-le-Comte), it presents an abrupt wall into the valley and the forest with the ruins of some round towers. The moat surrounding the fortress is preserved and can be visited. Some parts are overgrown and inaccessible. The vestiges of the round towers are hidden on their exterior face, but the entrance is well restored. The interior allows an understanding of the dimensions of the dwelling space available to the lord of the manor, with its walls and double bays of the Great Hall, below which one can see the
moat and a preserved section of the keep or donjon.

- The church, dating from the twelfth century.
- An unusual hollow tree, known as the "marriage tree"
- Many restored typical Picardy houses.
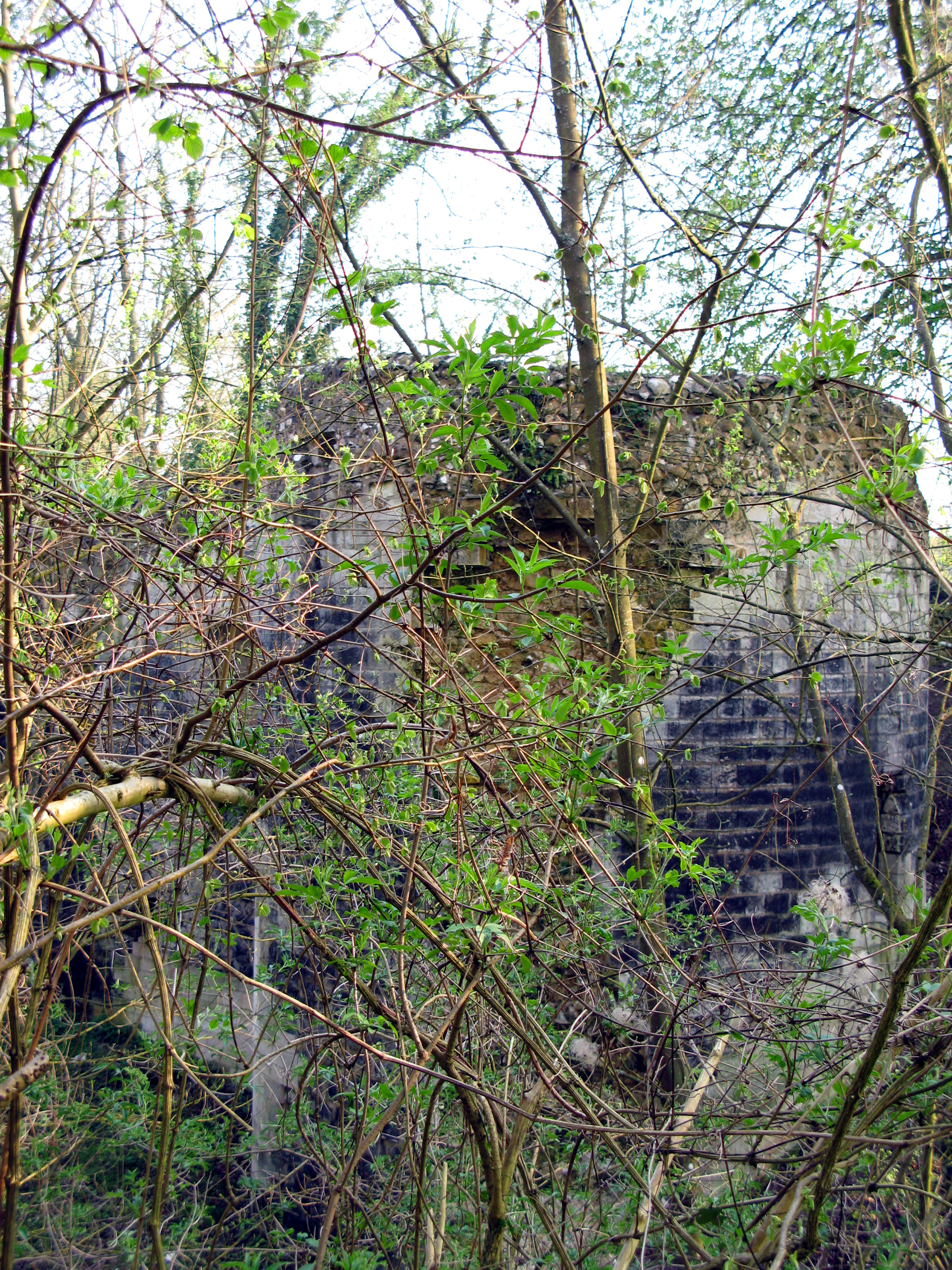
Château walls and moat

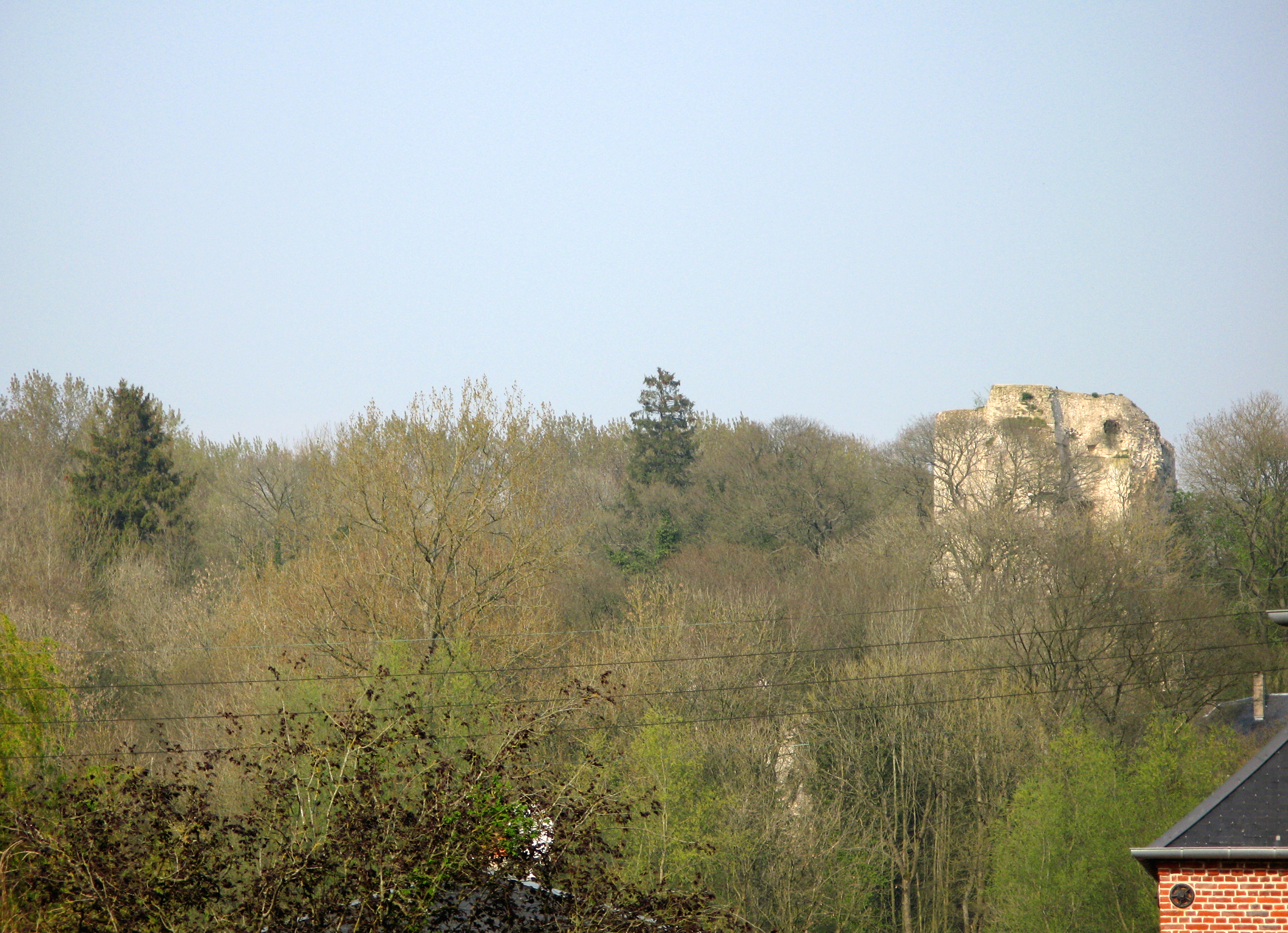
Ruins of the donjon

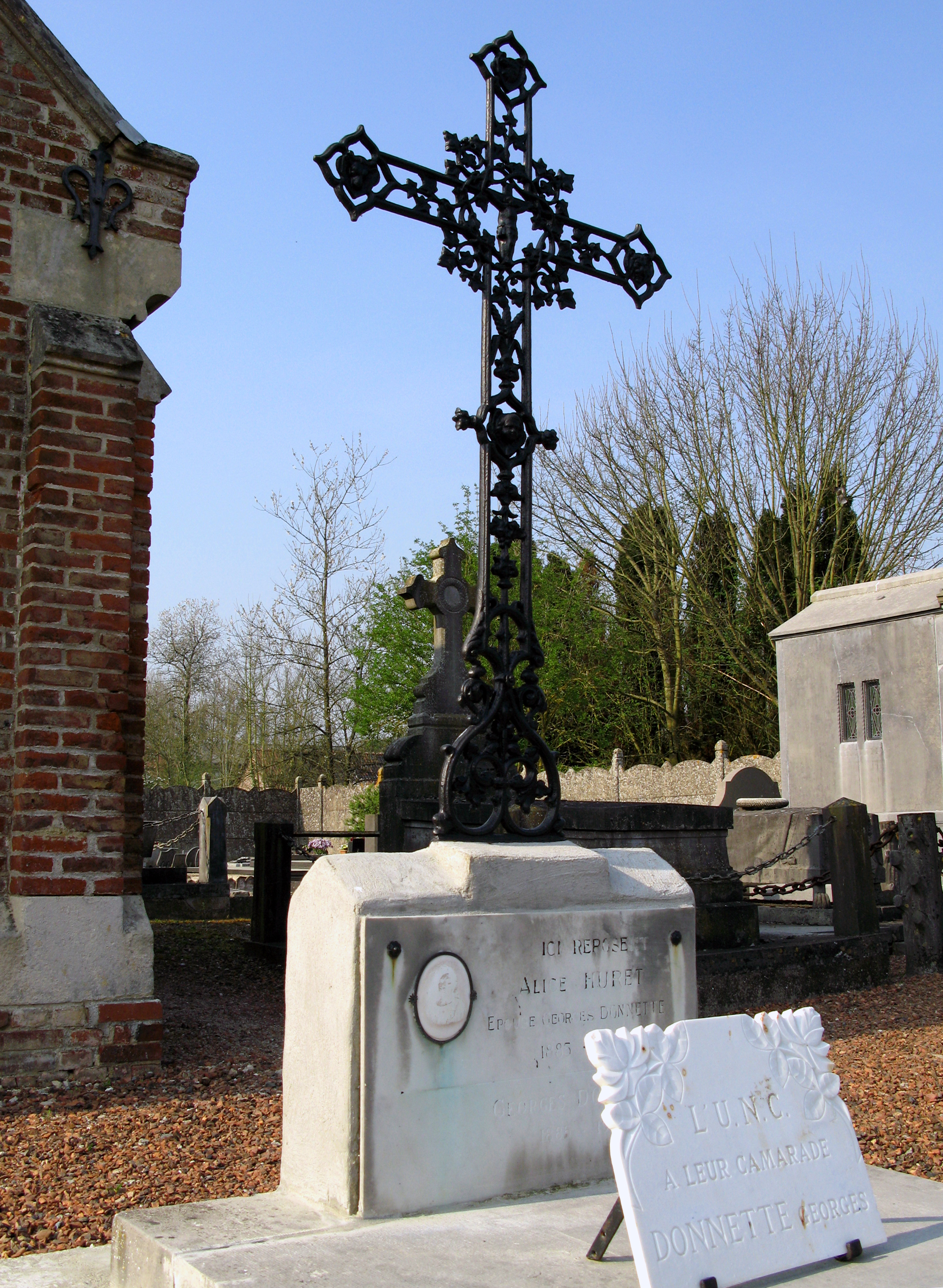
Cemetery

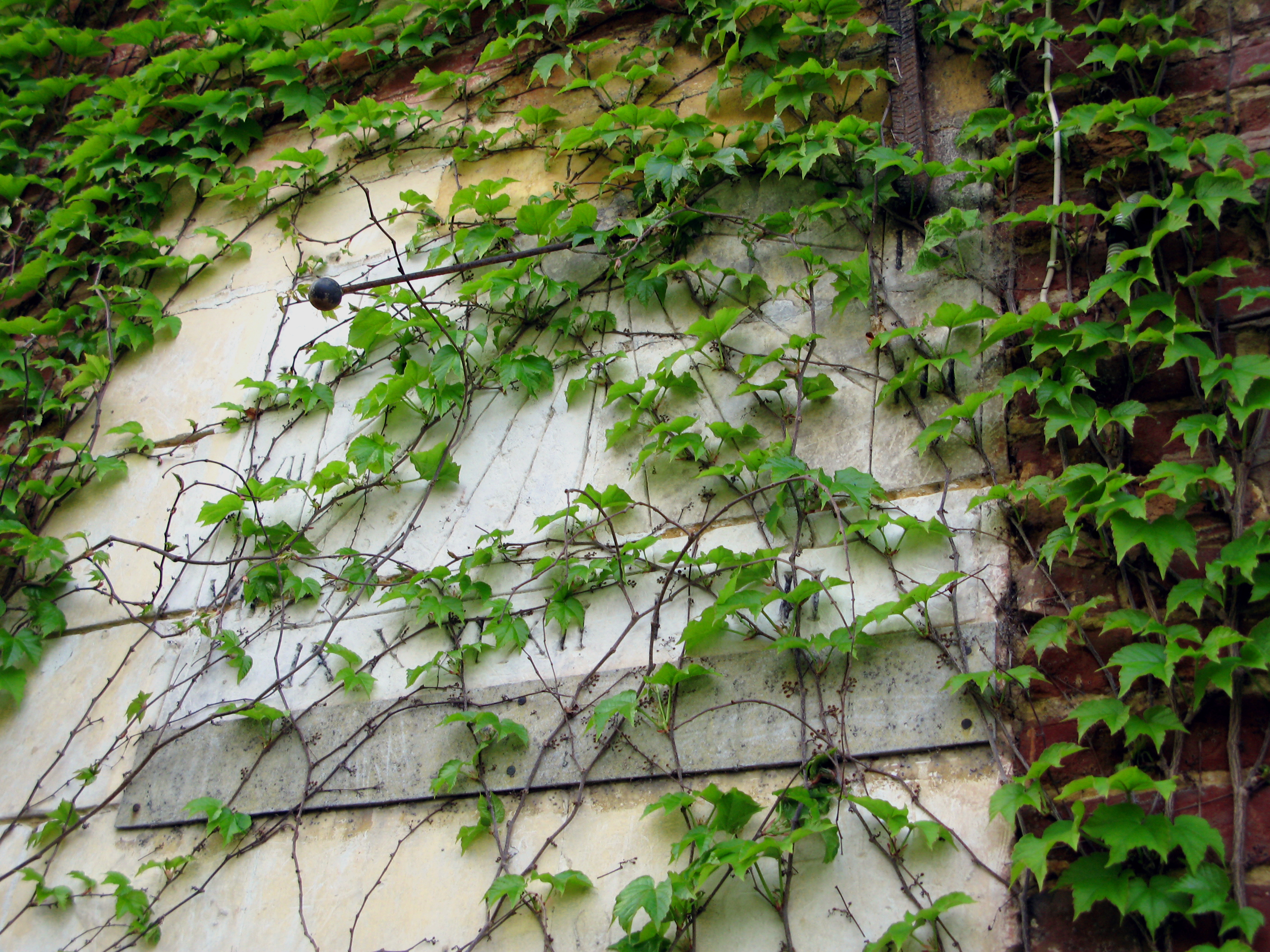
Sundial

== People ==
- Saint Leger, who was killed in the forest of Sarcing in 678.

== See also ==
- Communes of the Somme department
