= Neuvillette, Somme =

Neuvillette
- Commune
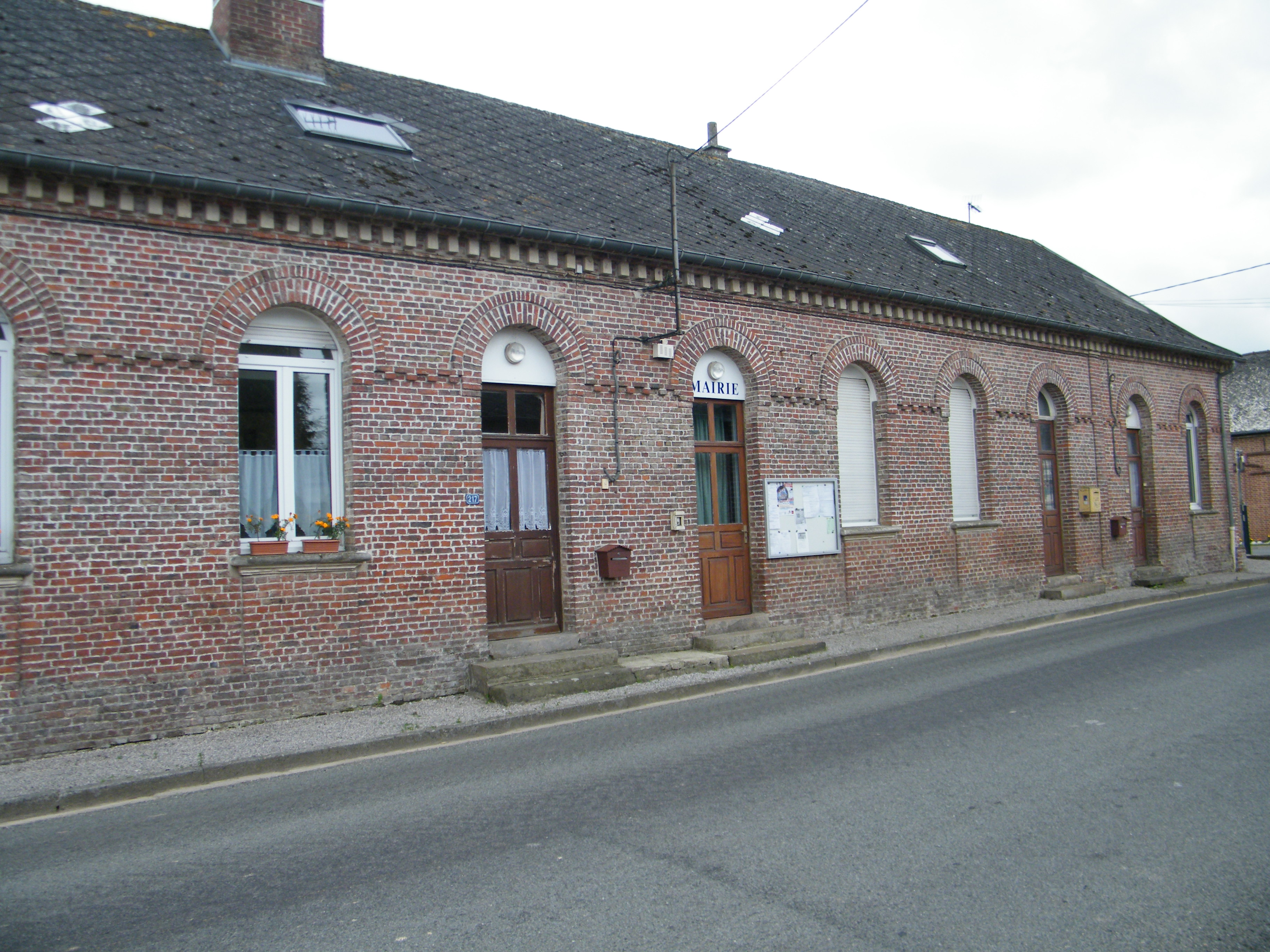
- The town hall in Neuvillette
- Location of Neuvillette
- Location within France Location within Hauts-de-France
- Coordinates: 50°12′32″N 2°19′13″E
- Country: France
- Region: Hauts-de-France
- Department: Somme
- Arrondissement: Amiens
- Canton: Doullens
- Intercommunality: CC Territoire Nord Picardie

Government
  - Mayor (2020–2026): José Doal
- Area^{1}: 3.13 km^{2} (1.21 sq mi)
- Elevation: 137 m (449 ft)
- Highest elevation: 147 m (482 ft)
- Lowest elevation: 85 m (279 ft)
- Population (2023): 212
  - Density: 67.7/km^{2} (175/sq mi)
- Time zone: UTC+01:00 (CET)
  - Summer (DST): UTC+02:00 (CEST)
- INSEE/Postal code: 80596 /80600
- ^{1} French Land Register data, which excludes lakes, ponds, glaciers > 1 km^{2} (0.386 sq mi or 247 acres) and river estuaries.

Neuvillette (French pronunciation: [nøvilɛt]) is a commune in the Somme department in Hauts-de-France in northern France.

== Geography ==
Neuvillette is situated on the D196 road, some 26 miles (42 km) northeast of Abbeville, near the border with the Pas-de-Calais département.

== Population ==
Historical population
Year	Pop.	±% p.a.
1968	184	—
1975	176	−0.63%
1982	157	−1.62%
1990	161	+0.31%
1999	179	+1.18%
2007	181	+0.14%
2012	219	+3.89%
2017	222	+0.27%
2023	212	−0.77%
Source: INSEE

== See also ==
- Communes of the Somme department
