= Canton of Doullens =

Coordinates: 50°9′27″N 2°20′29″E

Doullens
- Canton
- Interactive map of Doullens
- Country: France
- Region: Hauts-de-France
- Department: Somme
- No. of communes: {{{nbcomm}}}
- Area: 371.79 km^{2} (143.55 sq mi)
- Population (2023): 19,785
  - Density: 53.216/km^{2} (137.83/sq mi)
- INSEE code: 80 14

The Canton of Doullens is a canton situated in the department of the Somme and in the Hauts-de-France region of northern France.

== Geography ==
The canton is organised around the commune of Doullens.

== Composition ==
As part of the French canton reorganisation that came into effect in March 2015, the canton was expanded from 14 to 44 communes:

- Agenville
- Autheux
- Authieule
- Barly
- Béalcourt
- Beaumetz
- Beauquesne
- Beauval
- Bernâtre
- Bernaville
- Berneuil
- Boisbergues
- Bonneville
- Bouquemaison
- Brévillers
- Candas
- Conteville
- Domesmont
- Domléger-Longvillers
- Doullens
- Épécamps
- Fieffes-Montrelet
- Fienvillers
- Frohen-sur-Authie
- Gézaincourt
- Gorges
- Grouches-Luchuel
- Hem-Hardinval
- Heuzecourt
- Hiermont
- Humbercourt
- Longuevillette
- Lucheux
- Maizicourt
- Le Meillard
- Mézerolles
- Montigny-les-Jongleurs
- Neuvillette
- Occoches
- Outrebois
- Prouville
- Remaisnil
- Saint-Acheul
- Terramesnil

== Population ==
Historical population
Year	Pop.	±% p.a.
2013	20,961	—
2018	20,372	−0.57%
Source: INSEE

== See also ==
- Arrondissements of the Somme department
- Cantons of the Somme department
- Communes of the Somme department
