= Bonneville, Somme =

Bonneville
- Commune
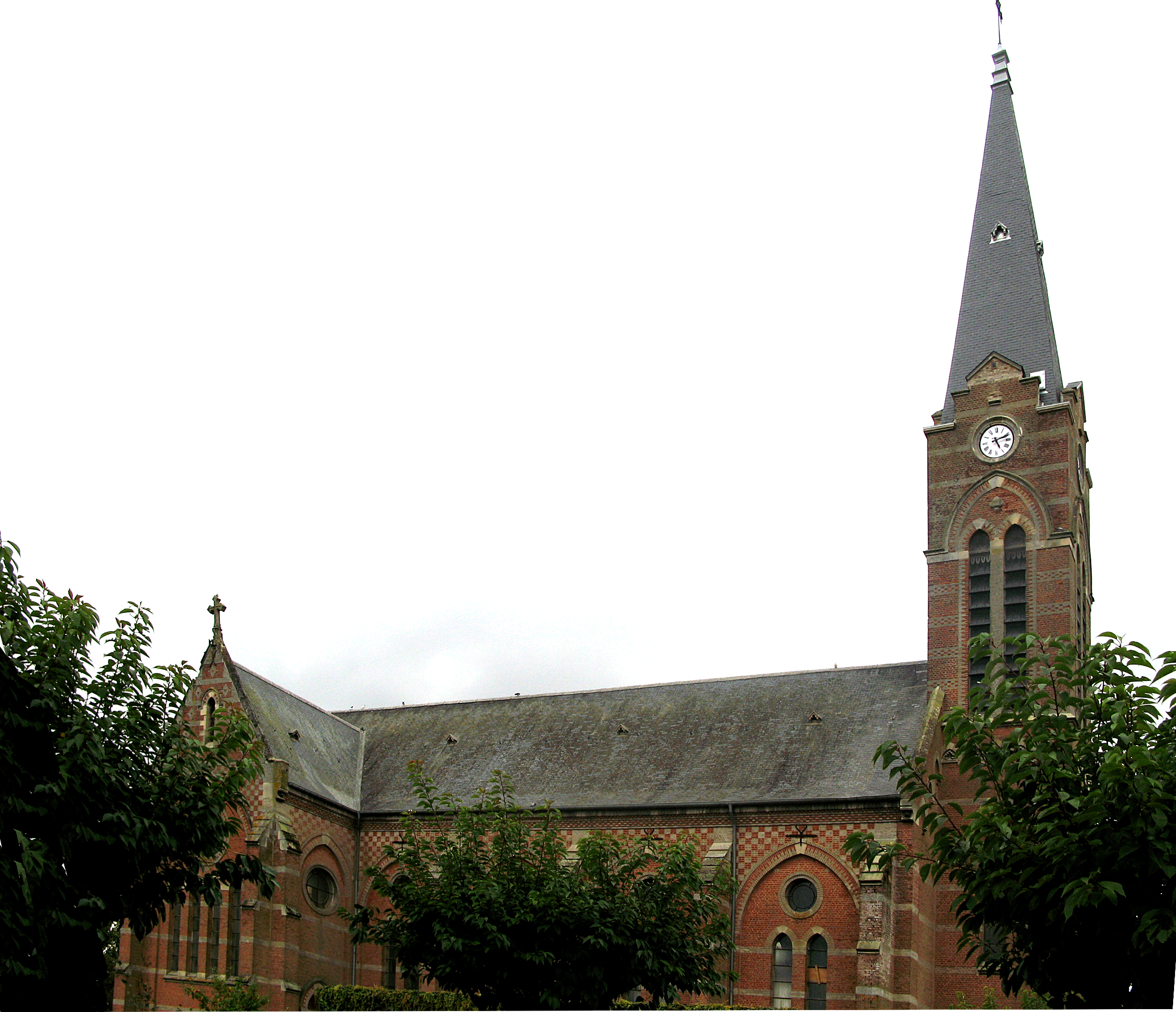
- The church in Bonneville
- Location of Bonneville
- Location within France Location within Hauts-de-France
- Coordinates: 50°04′58″N 2°14′59″E
- Country: France
- Region: Hauts-de-France
- Department: Somme
- Arrondissement: Amiens
- Canton: Doullens
- Intercommunality: CC Territoire Nord Picardie

Government
  - Mayor (2020–2026): Emmanuel Petit
- Area^{1}: 10.2 km^{2} (3.9 sq mi)
- Elevation: 156 m (512 ft)
- Highest elevation: 166 m (545 ft)
- Lowest elevation: 78 m (256 ft)
- Population (2023): 325
  - Density: 31.9/km^{2} (82.5/sq mi)
- Time zone: UTC+01:00 (CET)
  - Summer (DST): UTC+02:00 (CEST)
- INSEE/Postal code: 80113 /80670
- ^{1} French Land Register data, which excludes lakes, ponds, glaciers > 1 km^{2} (0.386 sq mi or 247 acres) and river estuaries.

Bonneville (French pronunciation: [bɔnvil]; Picard: Boéneville) is a commune in the Somme department in Hauts-de-France in northern France.

== Geography ==
Bonneville is situated on the D77 road, some 20 miles (32 km) east of Amiens.

== Population ==
Historical population
Year	Pop.	±% p.a.
1968	381	—
1975	346	−1.37%
1982	352	+0.25%
1990	346	−0.21%
1999	348	+0.06%
2007	353	+0.18%
2012	339	−0.81%
2017	331	−0.48%
2023	325	−0.30%
Source: INSEE

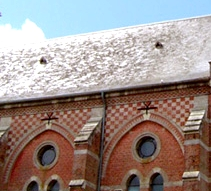
Detail of the chessboard brickwork

== See also ==
- Communes of the Somme department
