= Hem-Hardinval =

- Commune
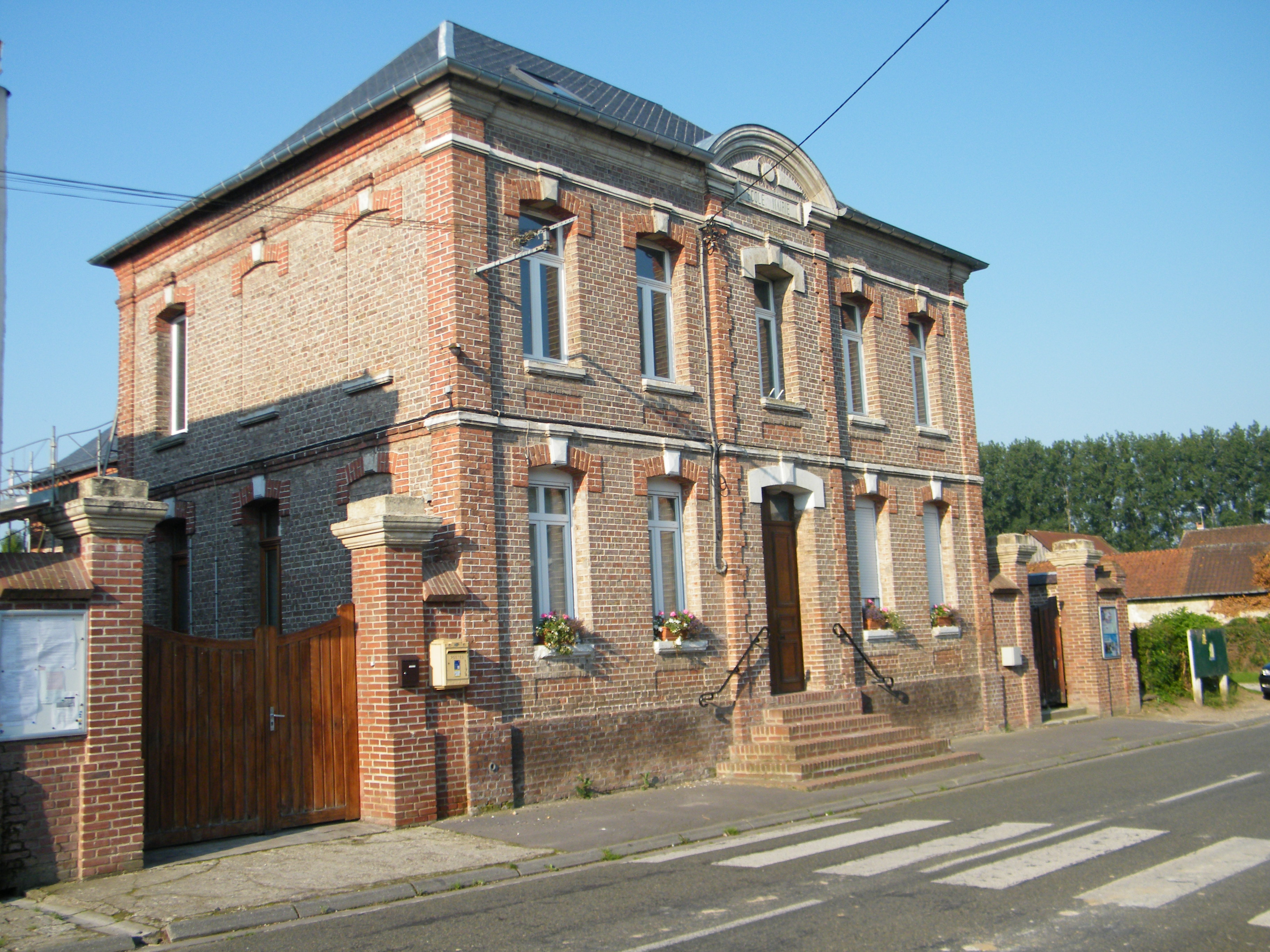
- The town hall and school in Hem-Hardinval
- Location of Hem-Hardinval
- Location within France Location within Hauts-de-France
- Coordinates: 50°09′48″N 2°18′06″E
- Country: France
- Region: Hauts-de-France
- Department: Somme
- Arrondissement: Amiens
- Canton: Doullens
- Intercommunality: CC Territoire Nord Picardie

Government
  - Mayor (2020–2026): Éric Roussel
- Area^{1}: 10.25 km^{2} (3.96 sq mi)
- Elevation: 32 m (105 ft)
- Highest elevation: 165 m (541 ft)
- Lowest elevation: 47 m (154 ft)
- Population (2023): 347
  - Density: 33.9/km^{2} (87.7/sq mi)
- Time zone: UTC+01:00 (CET)
  - Summer (DST): UTC+02:00 (CEST)
- INSEE/Postal code: 80427 /80600
- ^{1} French Land Register data, which excludes lakes, ponds, glaciers > 1 km^{2} (0.386 sq mi or 247 acres) and river estuaries.

Hem-Hardinval is a commune in the Somme department in Hauts-de-France in northern France.

== Geography ==
The commune is situated on the D925 and D128 junction, some 22 miles (35 km) northeast of Amiens by the banks of the Authie river, the département border with the Pas-de-Calais.

== Population ==
Historical population
Year	Pop.	±% p.a.
1968	202	—
1975	201	−0.07%
1982	246	+2.93%
1990	280	+1.63%
1999	278	−0.08%
2007	347	+2.81%
2012	350	+0.17%
2017	363	+0.73%
2023	347	−0.75%
Source: INSEE

== See also ==
- Communes of the Somme department
