= Beauval, Somme =

Beauval
- Commune
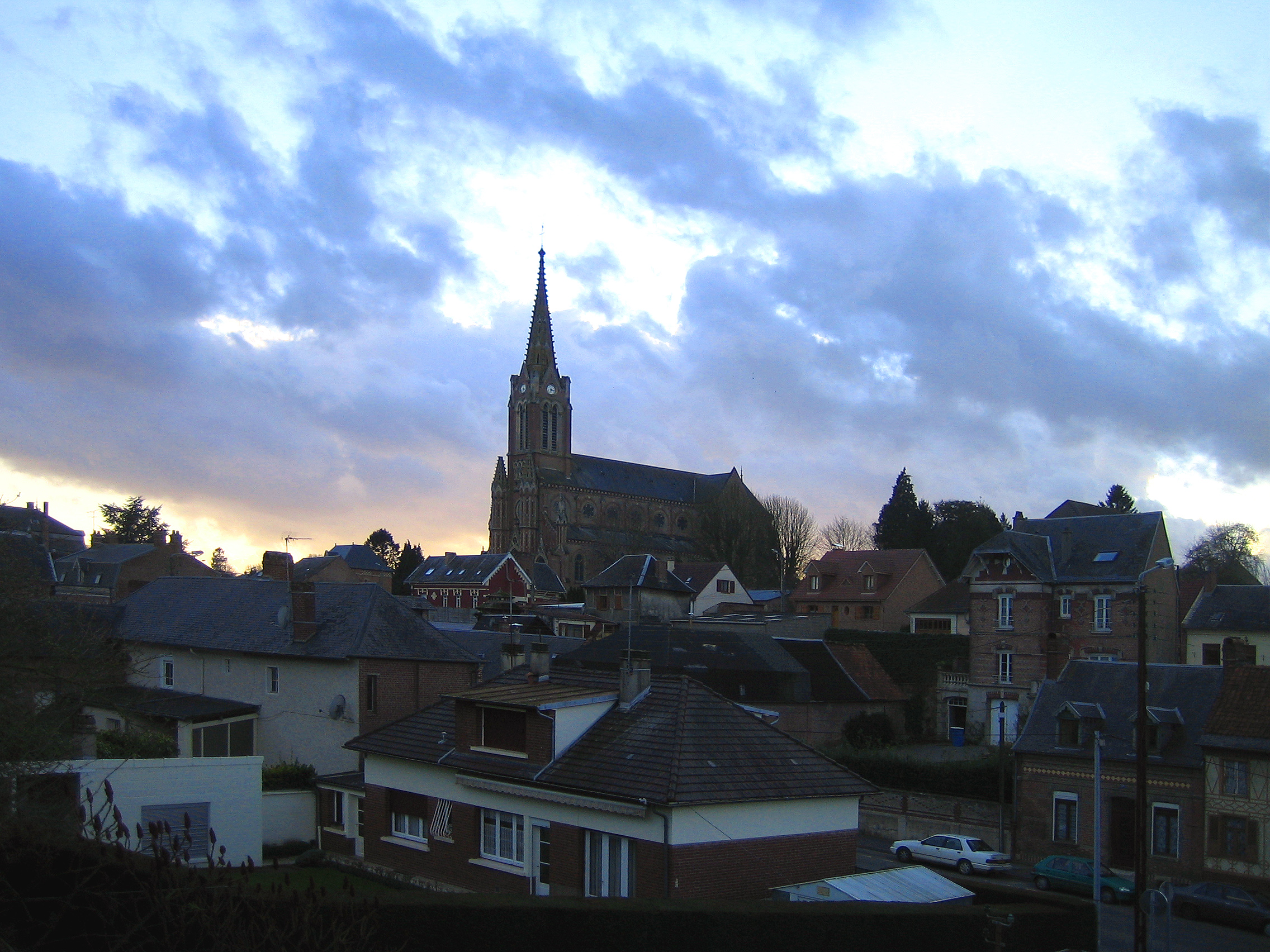
- The town centre of Beauval

- Coat of arms
- Location of Beauval
- Location within France Location within Hauts-de-France
- Coordinates: 50°06′23″N 2°19′49″E
- Country: France
- Region: Hauts-de-France
- Department: Somme
- Arrondissement: Amiens
- Canton: Doullens
- Intercommunality: CC Territoire Nord Picardie

Government
  - Mayor (2020–2026): Bernard Thuillier
- Area^{1}: 22.56 km^{2} (8.71 sq mi)
- Elevation: 116 m (381 ft)
- Highest elevation: 164 m (538 ft)
- Lowest elevation: 67 m (220 ft)
- Population (2023): 1,929
  - Density: 85.51/km^{2} (221.5/sq mi)
- Time zone: UTC+01:00 (CET)
  - Summer (DST): UTC+02:00 (CEST)
- INSEE/Postal code: 80071 /80630
- ^{1} French Land Register data, which excludes lakes, ponds, glaciers > 1 km^{2} (0.386 sq mi or 247 acres) and river estuaries.

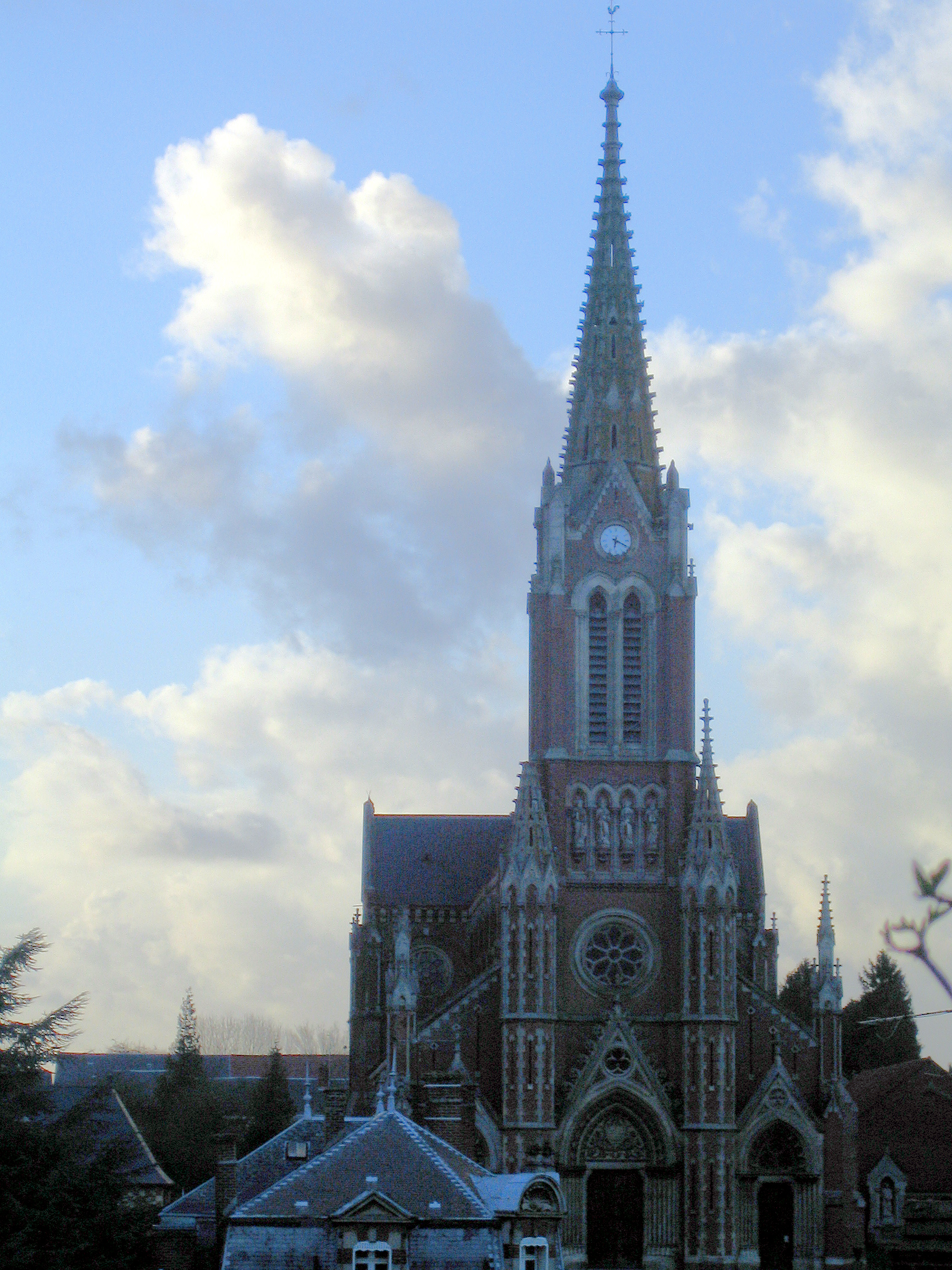
The church

Beauval (French pronunciation: [boval]; Picard: Bieuvo) is a commune in the Somme department in Hauts-de-France in northern France.

== Geography ==
Beauval is 20 miles (32 km) north of Amiens, towards Doullens, on the national road N25.

== Population ==
Historical population
Year	Pop.	±% p.a.
1968	2,192	—
1975	2,206	+0.09%
1982	2,274	+0.43%
1990	2,286	+0.07%
1999	2,243	−0.21%
2007	2,146	−0.55%
2012	2,121	−0.23%
2017	2,095	−0.25%
2023	1,929	−1.37%
Source: INSEE

== Places and monuments ==
- Magnificent church; the interior has been used as the backdrop to some French films.
- The War Memorial

== See also ==
- Communes of the Somme department
