= Longuevillette =

- Commune
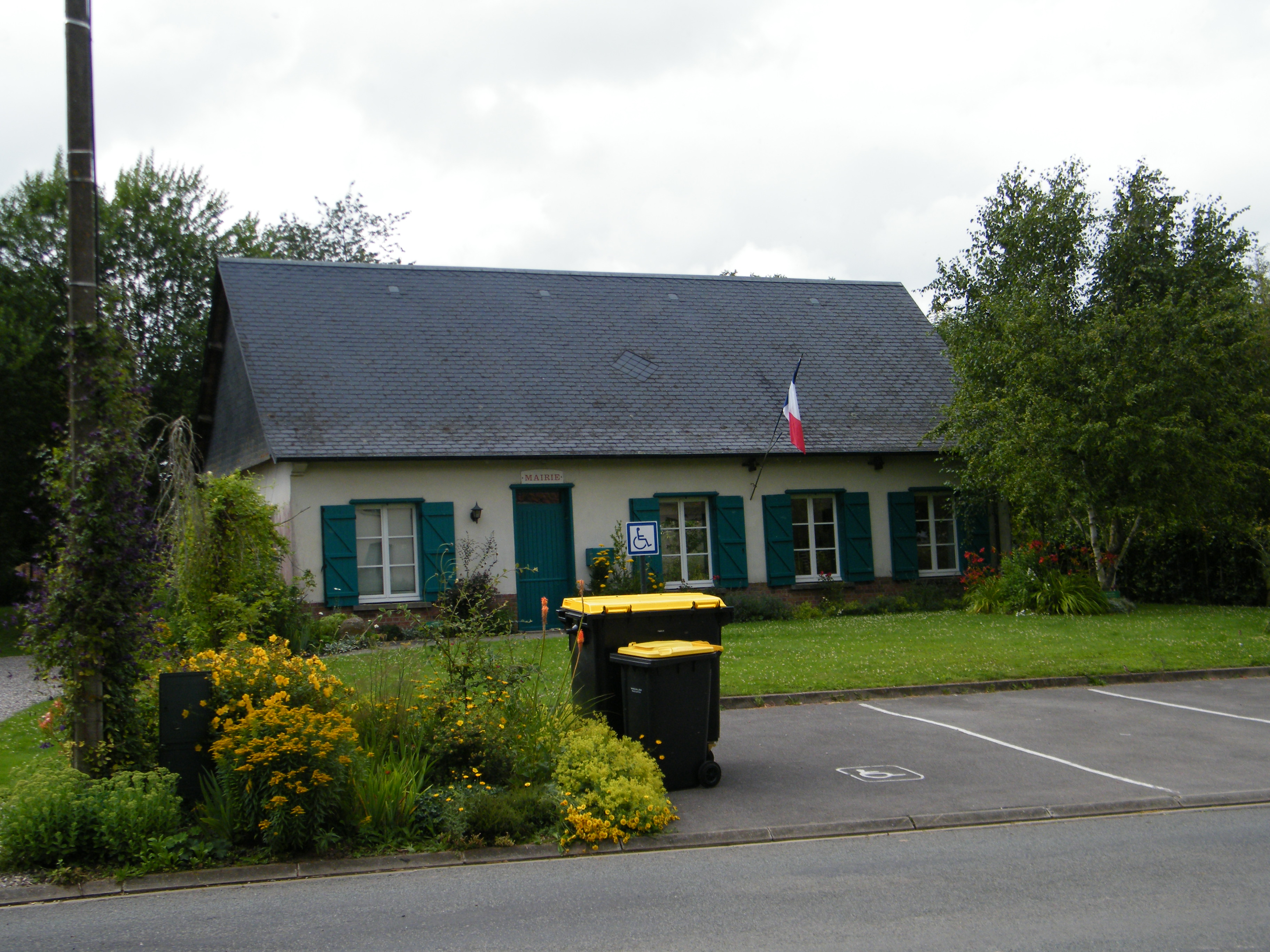
- The town hall in Longuevillette
- Location of Longuevillette
- Location within France Location within Hauts-de-France
- Coordinates: 50°07′48″N 2°16′27″E
- Country: France
- Region: Hauts-de-France
- Department: Somme
- Arrondissement: Amiens
- Canton: Doullens
- Intercommunality: CC Territoire Nord Picardie

Government
  - Mayor (2020–2026): François Crepin
- Area^{1}: 2.06 km^{2} (0.80 sq mi)
- Elevation: 160 m (520 ft)
- Highest elevation: 157 m (515 ft)
- Lowest elevation: 109 m (358 ft)
- Population (2023): 67
  - Density: 33/km^{2} (84/sq mi)
- Time zone: UTC+01:00 (CET)
  - Summer (DST): UTC+02:00 (CEST)
- INSEE/Postal code: 80491 /80600
- ^{1} French Land Register data, which excludes lakes, ponds, glaciers > 1 km^{2} (0.386 sq mi or 247 acres) and river estuaries.

Longuevillette (French pronunciation: [lɔ̃ɡvilɛt]) is a commune in the Somme department in Hauts-de-France in northern France.

== Geography ==
Longuevillette is situated 16 miles (26 km) north of Amiens, on the D31e road. To the north, the soil is mostly clayey, to the south, the soil is mostly silico-limestone. The town is placed on a plateau that separates the courses of the Somme and the Authie. Well water comes from a water table 50 meters deep.

== Environmental Policy ==
The community rewards the three flowers award to local efforts in favor of the environment.

== Population ==
Historical population
Year	Pop.	±% p.a.
1968	66	—
1975	58	−1.83%
1982	55	−0.76%
1990	69	+2.88%
1999	60	−1.54%
2007	75	+2.83%
2012	73	−0.54%
2017	77	+1.07%
2023	67	−2.29%
Source: INSEE

== See also ==
- Communes of the Somme department
