= Bernâtre =

- Commune
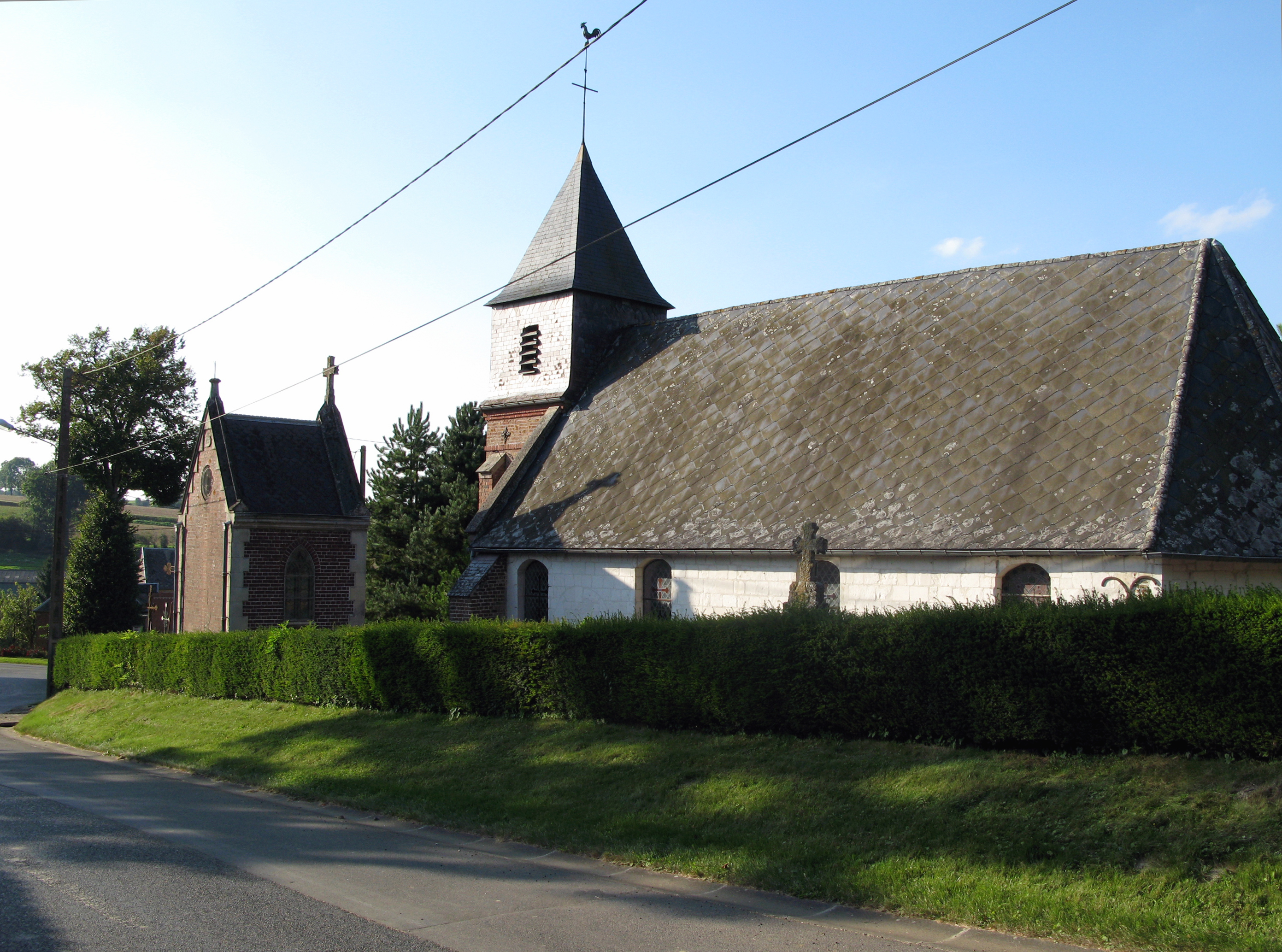
- The church in Bernâtre
- Location of Bernâtre
- Location within France Location within Hauts-de-France
- Coordinates: 50°11′54″N 2°05′34″E
- Country: France
- Region: Hauts-de-France
- Department: Somme
- Arrondissement: Amiens
- Canton: Doullens
- Intercommunality: CC Territoire Nord Picardie

Government
  - Mayor (2020–2026): Raphaël Lejeune
- Area^{1}: 4.59 km^{2} (1.77 sq mi)
- Elevation: 85 m (279 ft)
- Highest elevation: 137 m (449 ft)
- Lowest elevation: 60 m (200 ft)
- Population (2023): 40
  - Density: 8.7/km^{2} (23/sq mi)
- Time zone: UTC+01:00 (CET)
  - Summer (DST): UTC+02:00 (CEST)
- INSEE/Postal code: 80085 /80370
- ^{1} French Land Register data, which excludes lakes, ponds, glaciers > 1 km^{2} (0.386 sq mi or 247 acres) and river estuaries.

Bernâtre (French pronunciation: [bɛʁnatʁ]; Picard: Barnate) is a commune in the Somme department in Hauts-de-France in northern France.

== Geography ==
The commune is situated on the D166 road, some 15 miles (24 km) northeast of Abbeville.

== Population ==
Historical population
Year	Pop.	±% p.a.
1968	73	—
1975	58	−3.23%
1982	45	−3.56%
1990	46	+0.28%
1999	47	+0.24%
2007	45	−0.54%
2012	32	−6.59%
2017	32	+0.00%
2023	40	+3.79%
Source: INSEE

== See also ==
- Communes of the Somme department
