= Boisbergues =

- Commune
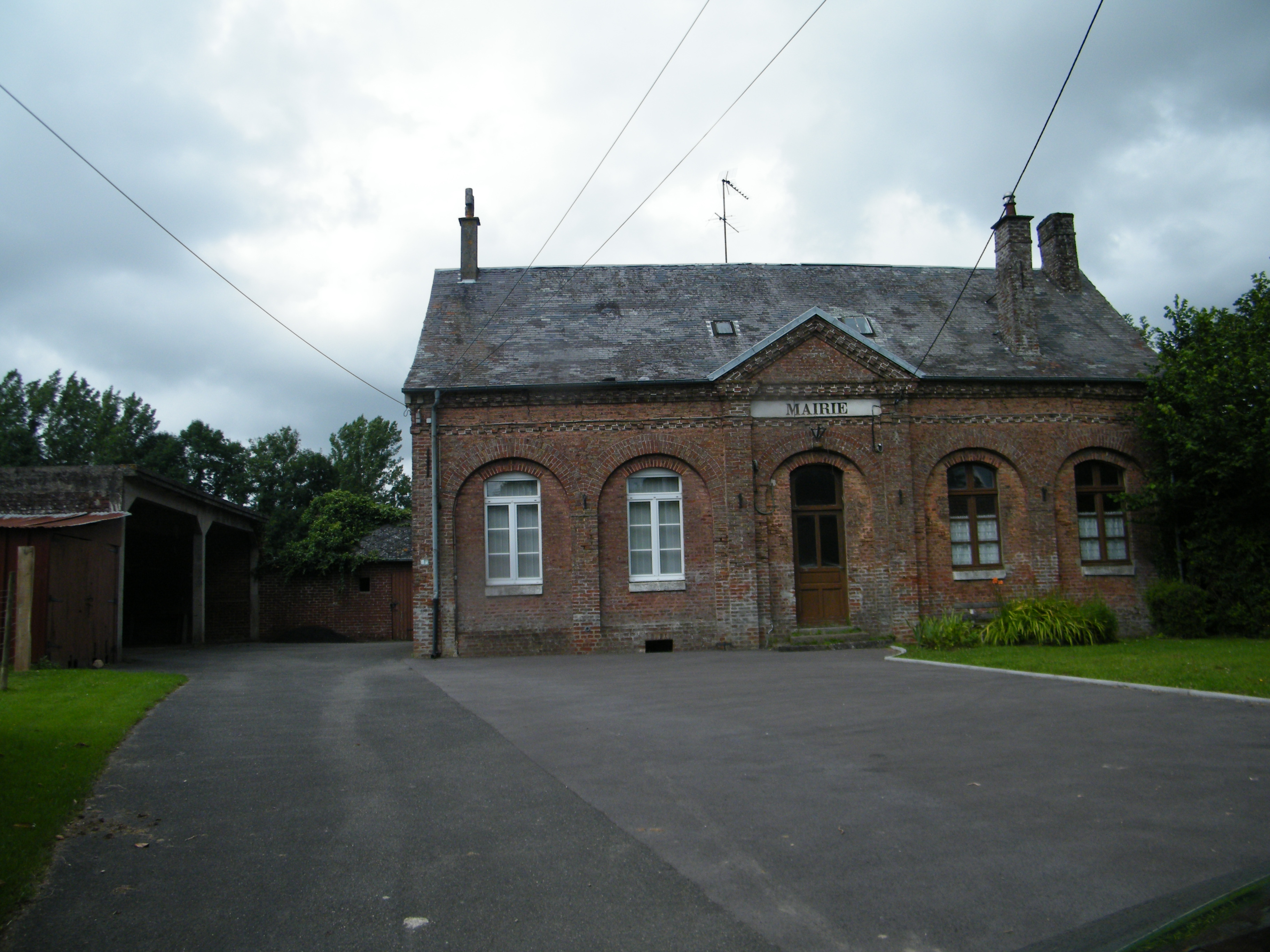
- The town hall in Boisbergues
- Location of Boisbergues
- Location within France Location within Hauts-de-France
- Coordinates: 50°09′00″N 2°13′47″E
- Country: France
- Region: Hauts-de-France
- Department: Somme
- Arrondissement: Amiens
- Canton: Doullens
- Intercommunality: CC Territoire Nord Picardie

Government
  - Mayor (2023–2026): Christophe Ossart
- Area^{1}: 4.31 km^{2} (1.66 sq mi)
- Elevation: 150 m (490 ft)
- Highest elevation: 152 m (499 ft)
- Lowest elevation: 59 m (194 ft)
- Population (2023): 64
  - Density: 15/km^{2} (38/sq mi)
- Time zone: UTC+01:00 (CET)
  - Summer (DST): UTC+02:00 (CEST)
- INSEE/Postal code: 80108 /80600
- ^{1} French Land Register data, which excludes lakes, ponds, glaciers > 1 km^{2} (0.386 sq mi or 247 acres) and river estuaries.

Boisbergues (French pronunciation: [bwabɛʁɡ]; Picard: Boébérque) is a commune in the Somme department in Hauts-de-France in northern France.

== Geography ==
Boisbergues is situated 29 km east of Abbeville on the D59 road.

== Population ==
Historical population
| Year | Pop. | ±% p.a. |
|---|---|---|
| 1968 | 96 | — |
| 1975 | 83 | −2.06% |
| 1982 | 79 | −0.70% |
| 1990 | 71 | −1.33% |
| 1999 | 76 | +0.76% |
| 2007 | 84 | +1.26% |
| 2012 | 85 | +0.24% |
| 2017 | 78 | −1.70% |
| 2023 | 64 | −3.24% |
Source: INSEE

== See also ==
- Communes of the Somme department
