= Épécamps =

- Commune
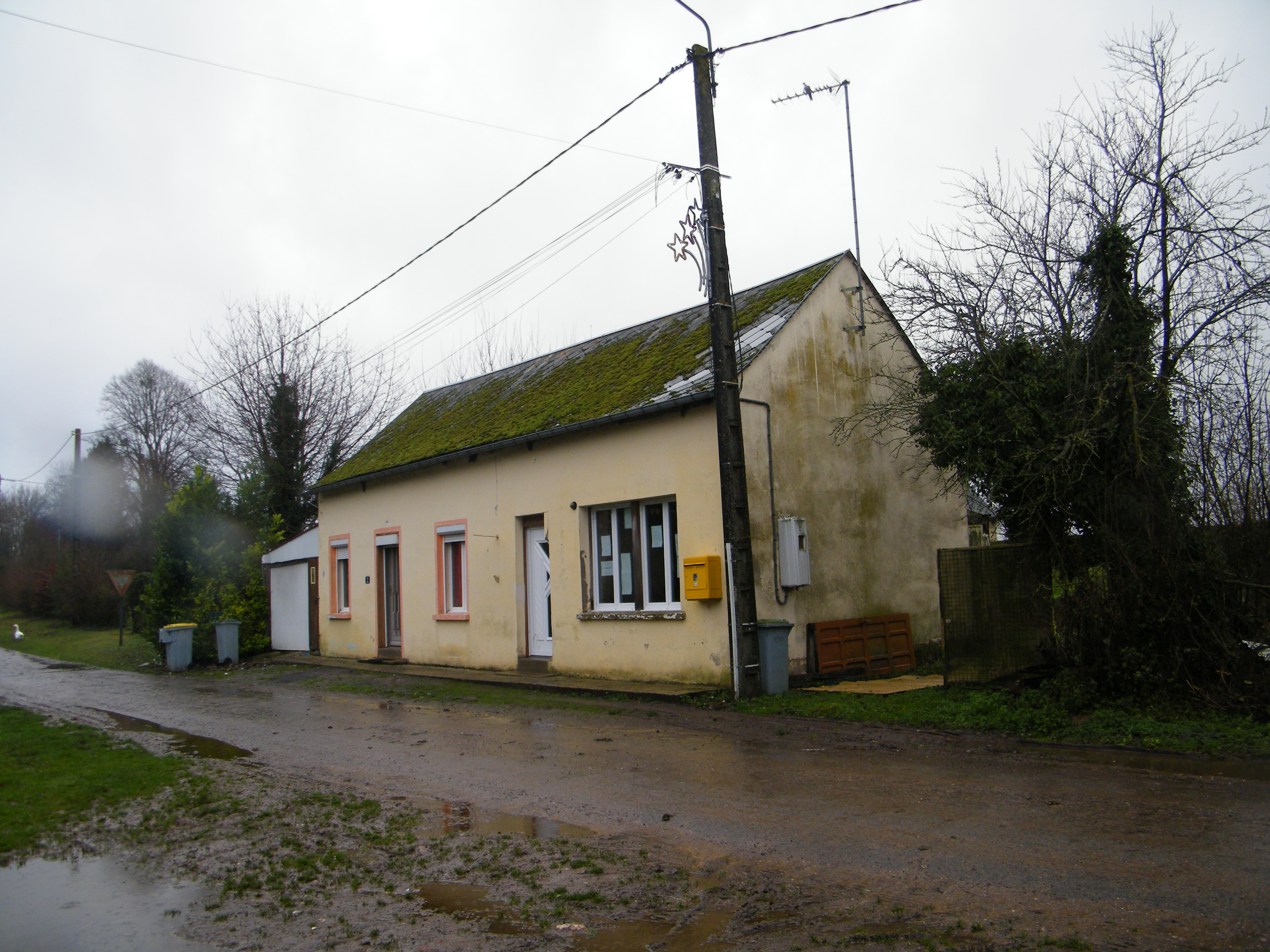
- Town hall.
- Location of Épécamps
- Location within France Location within Hauts-de-France
- Coordinates: 50°06′48″N 2°09′21″E
- Country: France
- Region: Hauts-de-France
- Department: Somme
- Arrondissement: Amiens
- Canton: Doullens
- Intercommunality: Territoire Nord Picardie

Government
  - Mayor (2023–2026): Dimitri Cahon
- Area^{1}: 1.6 km^{2} (0.62 sq mi)
- Elevation: 136 m (446 ft)
- Highest elevation: 146 m (479 ft)
- Lowest elevation: 75 m (246 ft)
- Population (2023): 7
  - Density: 4.4/km^{2} (11/sq mi)
- Time zone: UTC+01:00 (CET)
  - Summer (DST): UTC+02:00 (CEST)
- INSEE/Postal code: 80270 /80370
- ^{1} French Land Register data, which excludes lakes, ponds, glaciers > 1 km^{2} (0.386 sq mi or 247 acres) and river estuaries.

Épécamps (French pronunciation: [epekɑ̃]) is a commune in the Somme department in Hauts-de-France in northern France.

== Geography ==
The least populous commune in the department, Épécamps is situated on the D118 road, some 28 km (17 mi) east of Abbeville.

== Population ==
Historical population
Year	Pop.	±% p.a.
1968	10	—
1975	13	+3.82%
1982	12	−1.14%
1990	12	+0.00%
1999	11	−0.96%
2007	8	−3.90%
2012	5	−8.97%
2017	5	+0.00%
2023	7	+5.77%
Source: INSEE

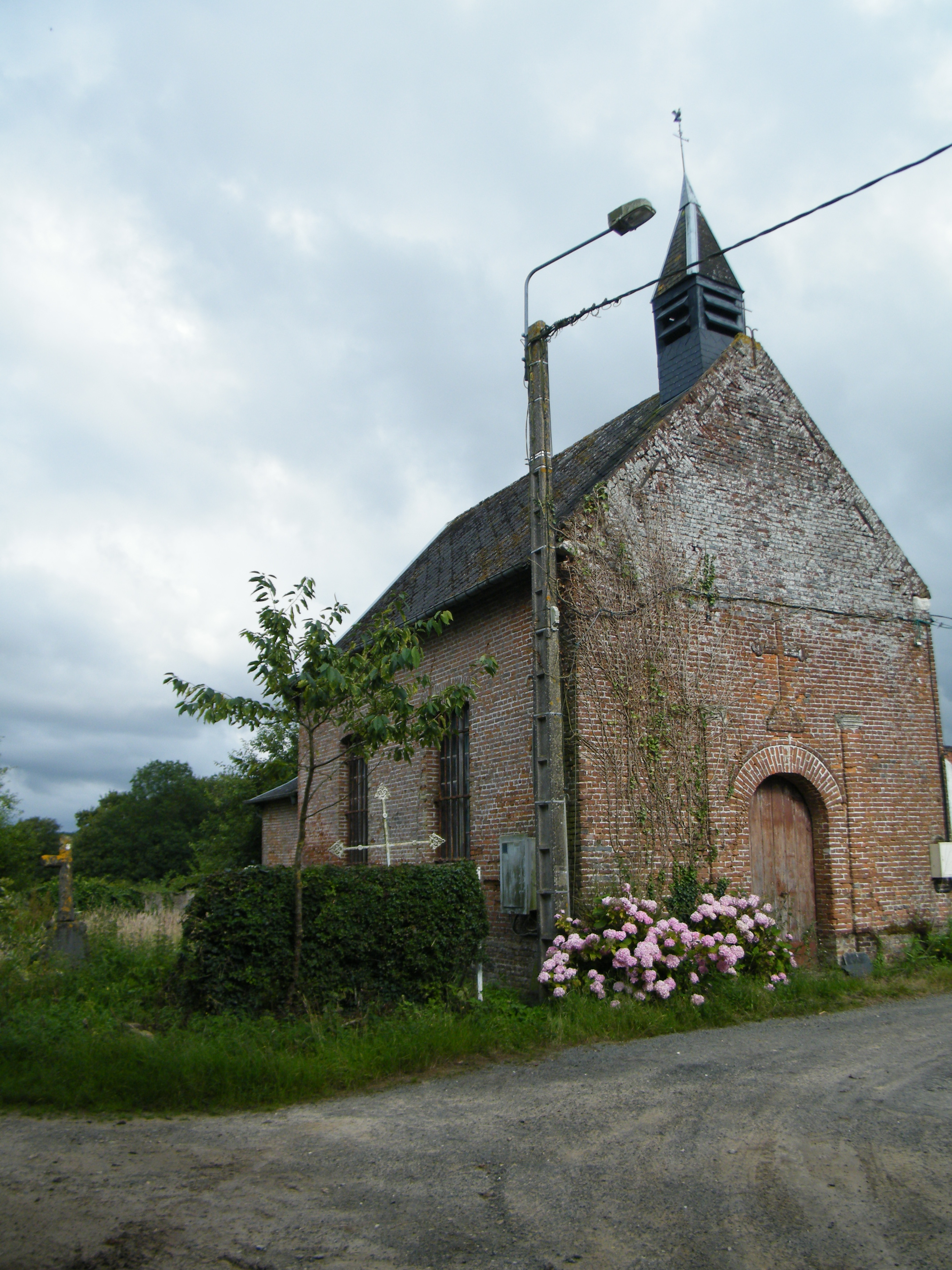
The church.

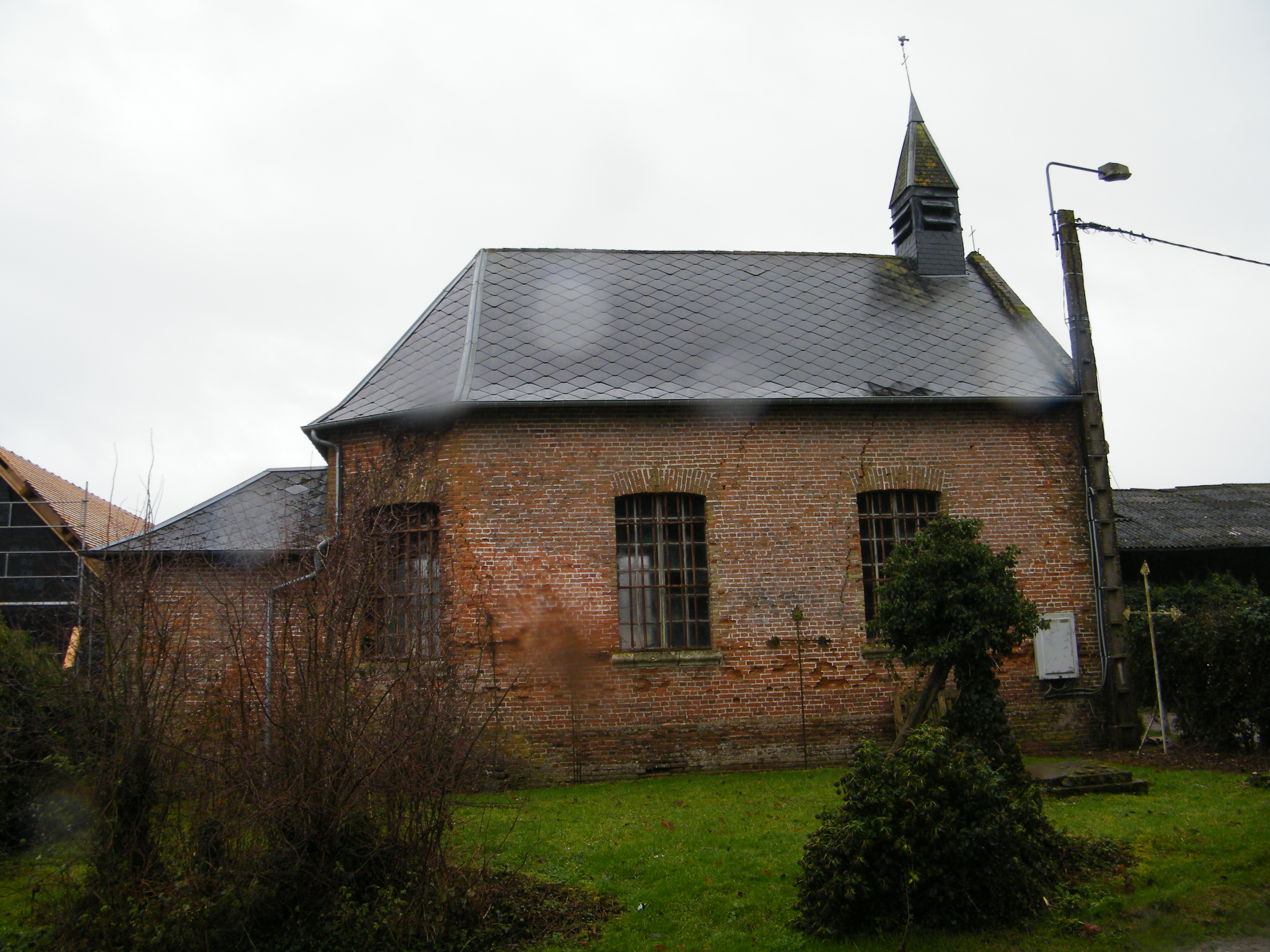
North side.

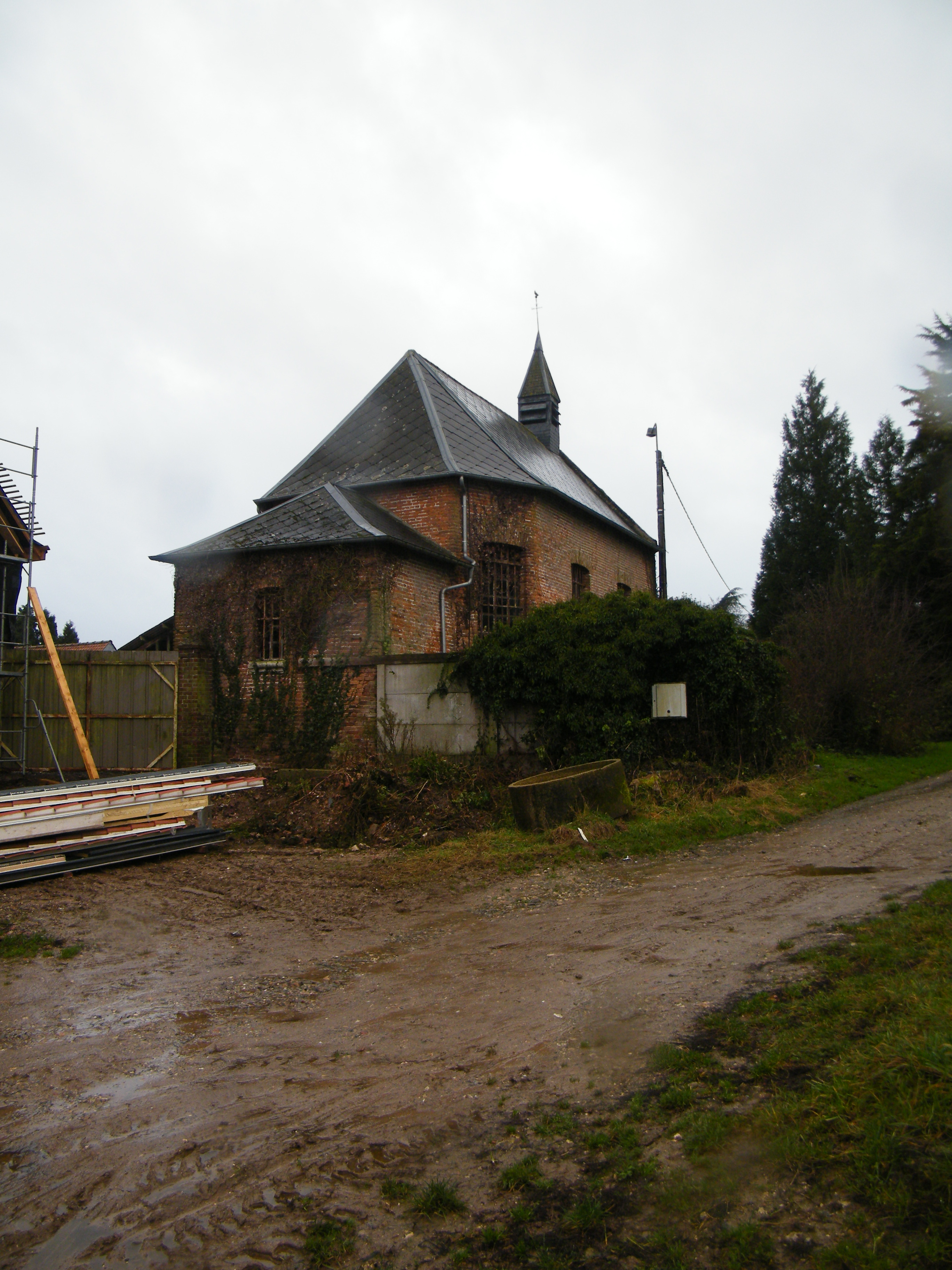
East side.

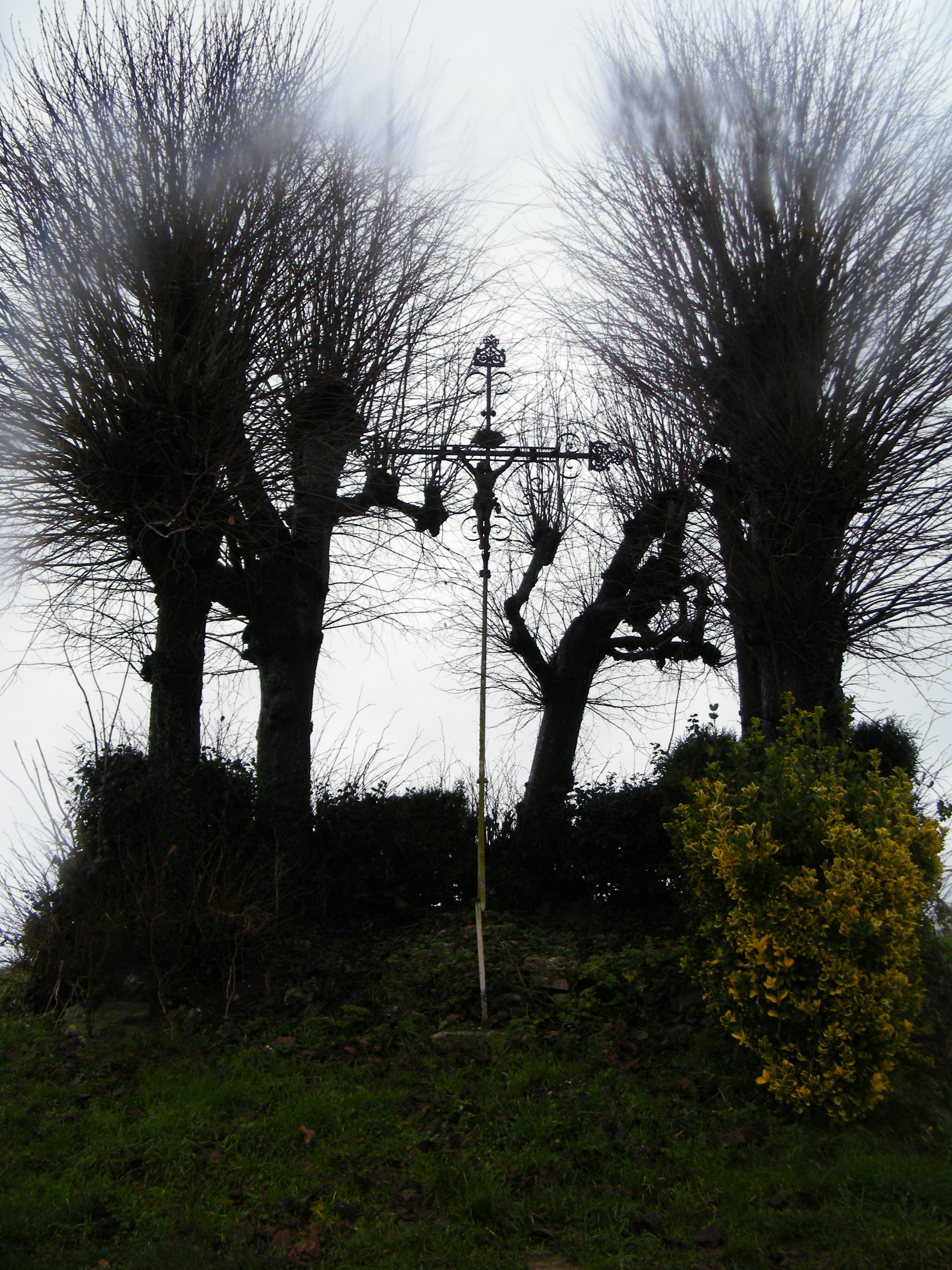
Calvary.

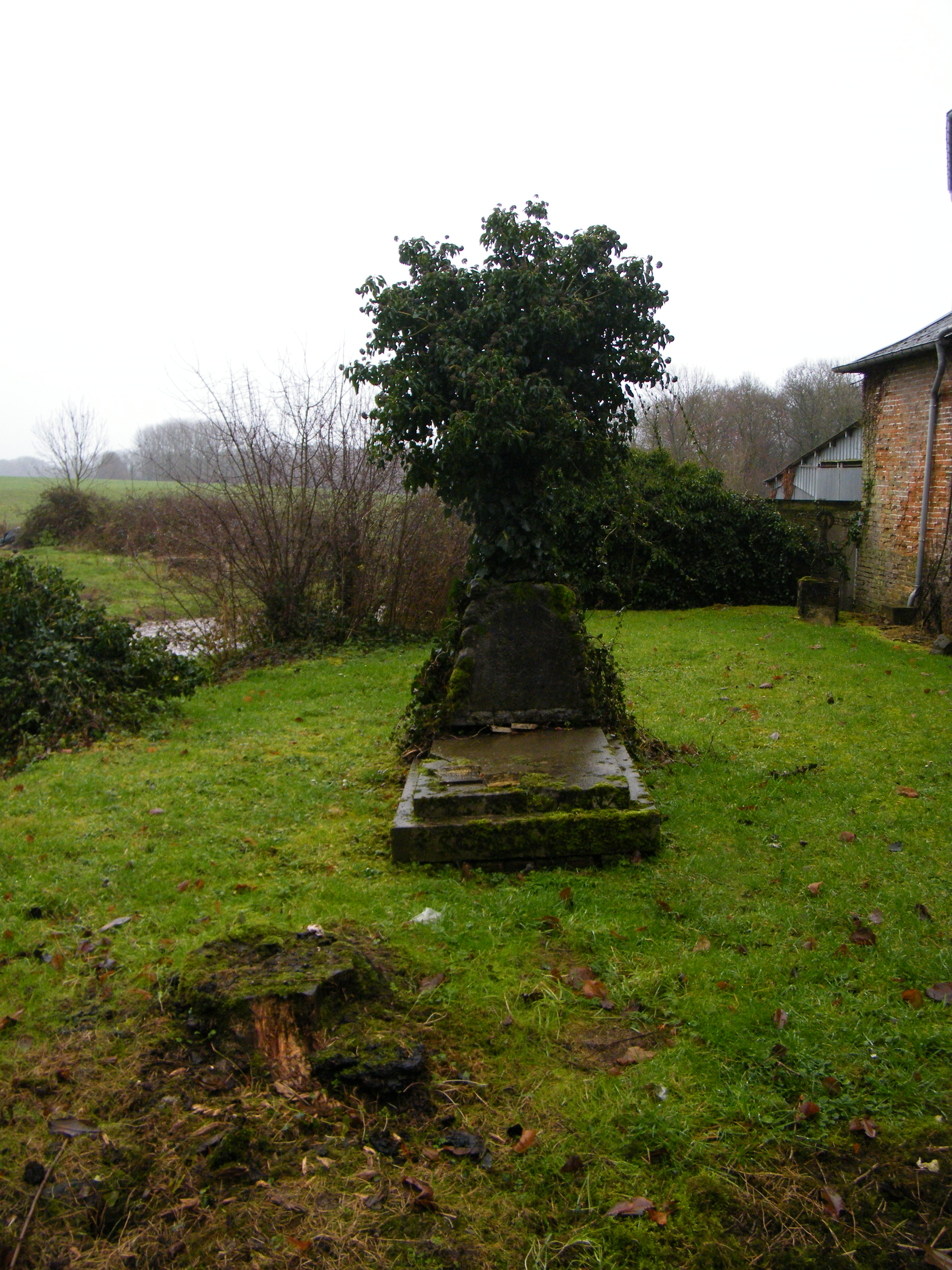
Cemetery.

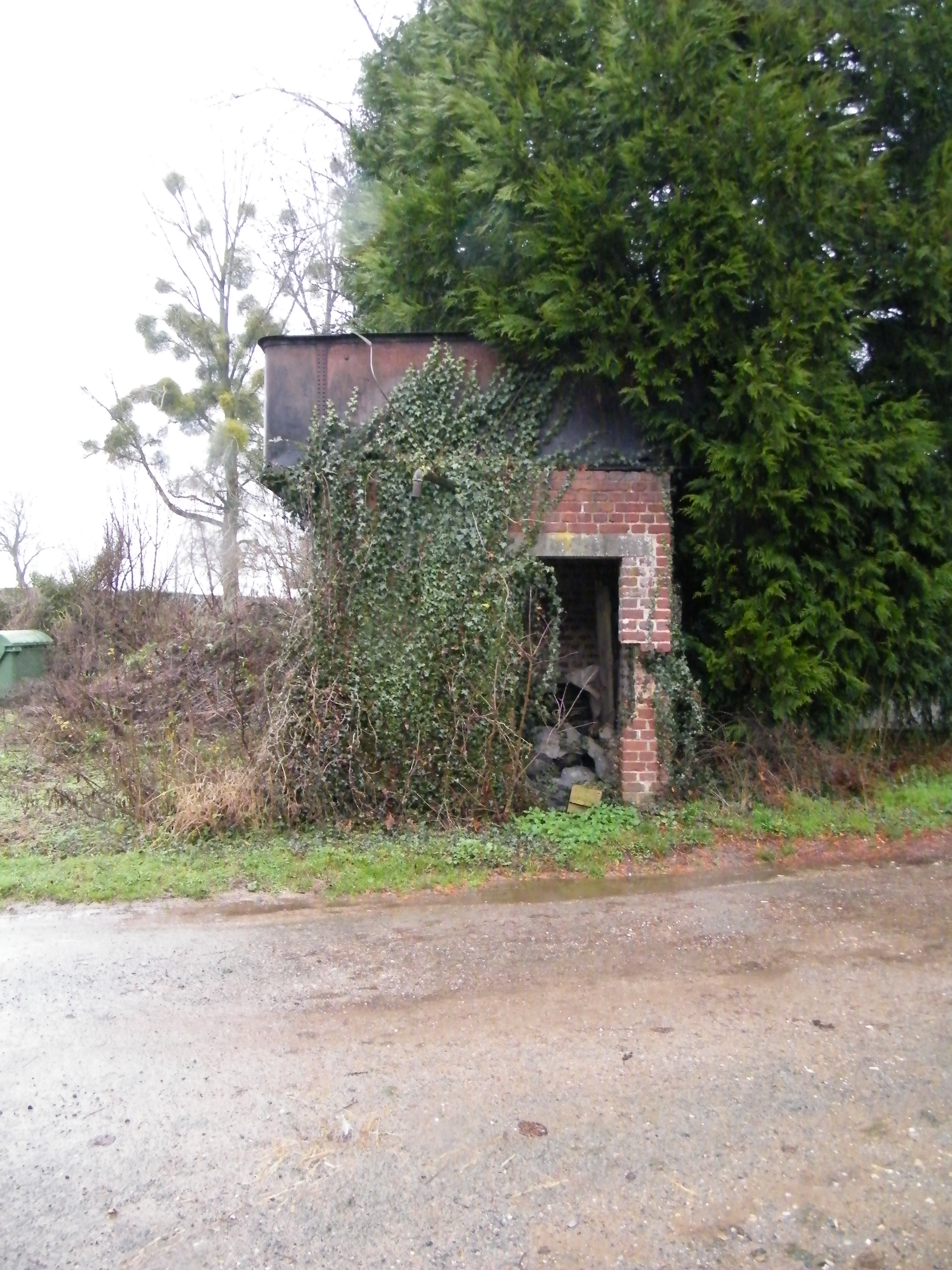
Water tower.

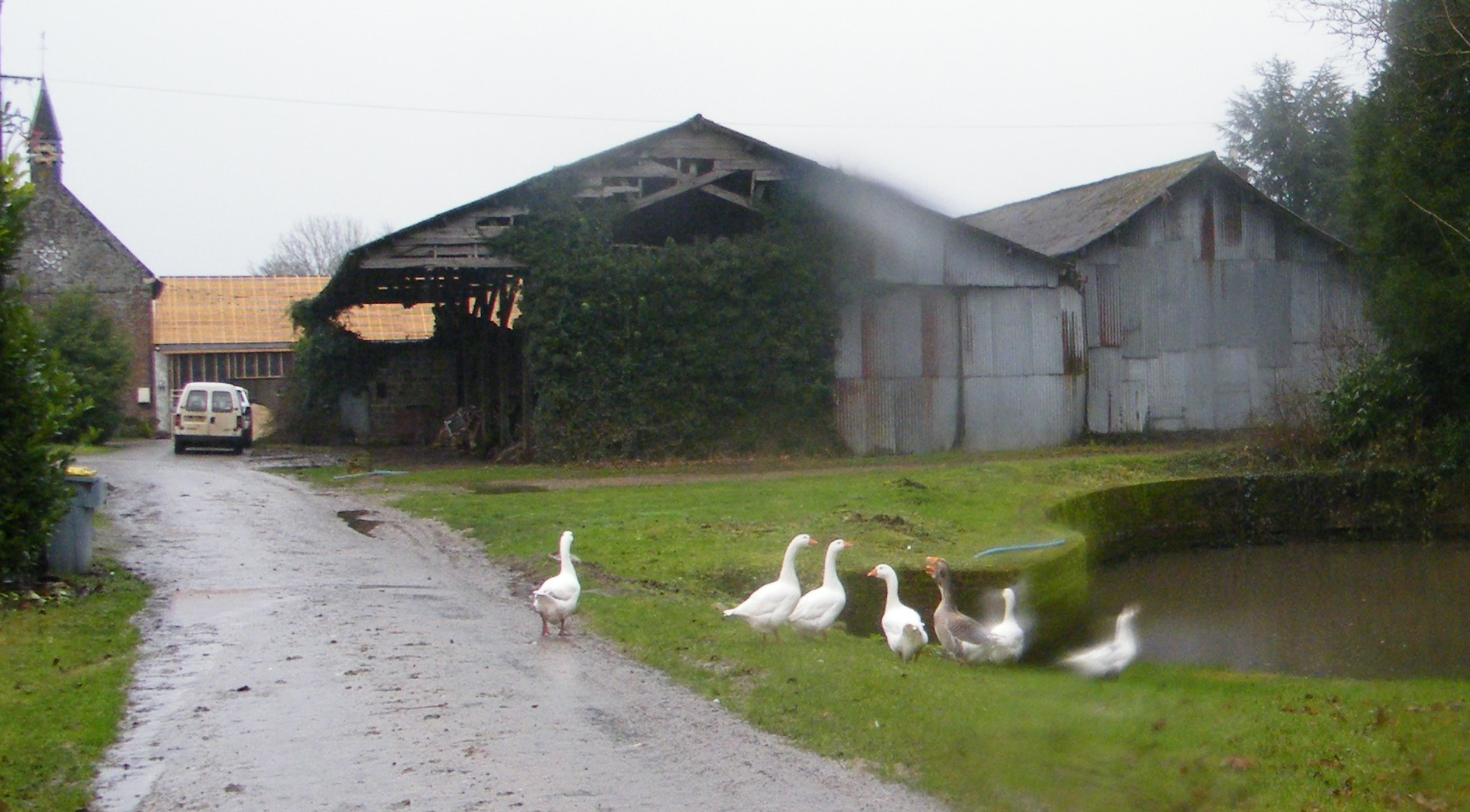
Body of water.

== See also ==
- Communes of the Somme department
