= Autheux =

- Commune
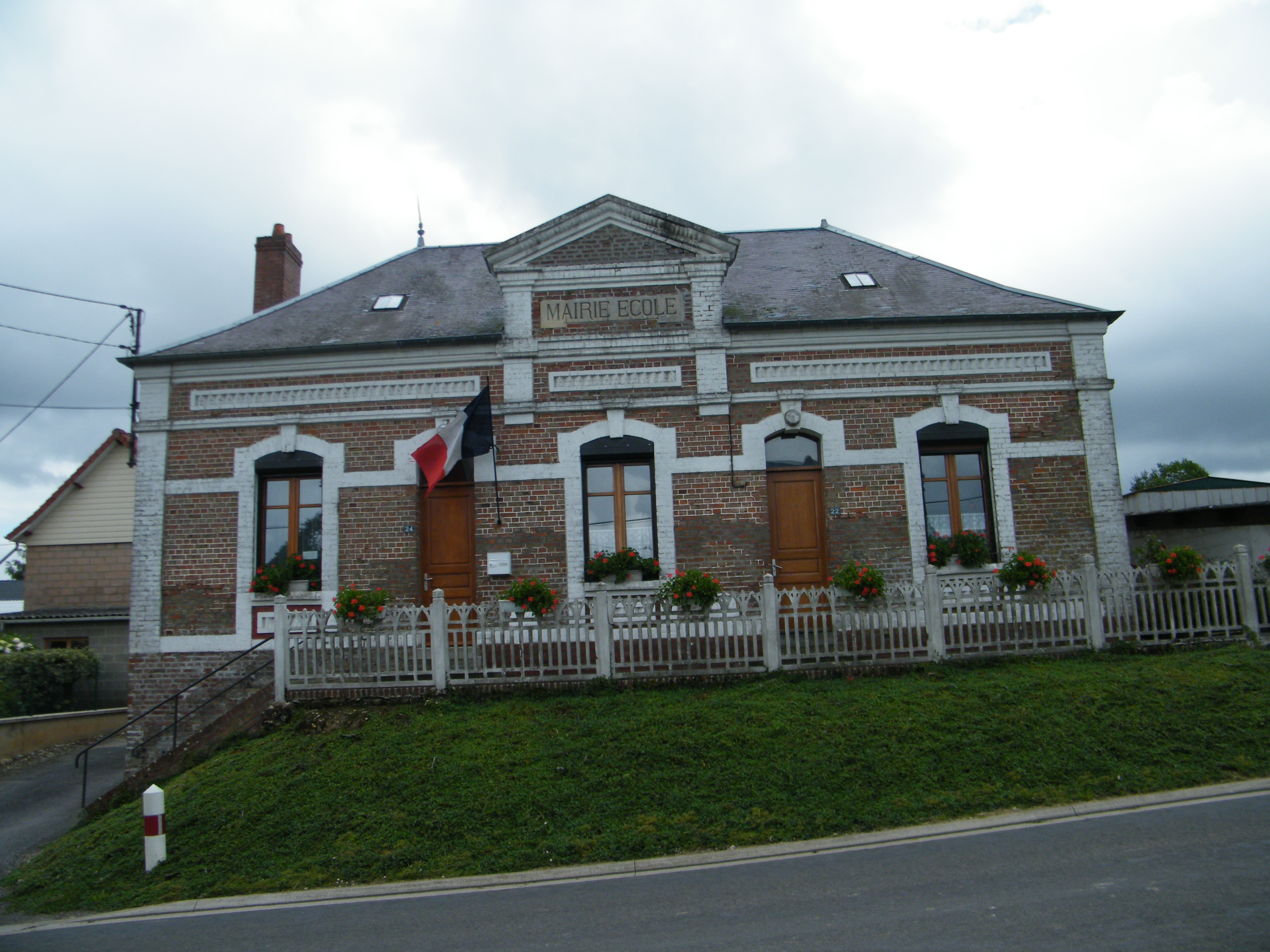
- The town hall and school in Autheux

- Coat of arms
- Location of Autheux
- Location within France Location within Hauts-de-France
- Coordinates: 50°08′37″N 2°13′49″E
- Country: France
- Region: Hauts-de-France
- Department: Somme
- Arrondissement: Amiens
- Canton: Doullens
- Intercommunality: CC Territoire Nord Picardie

Government
  - Mayor (2020–2026): Régis Desplanque
- Area^{1}: 8.27 km^{2} (3.19 sq mi)
- Elevation: 148 m (486 ft)
- Highest elevation: 161 m (528 ft)
- Lowest elevation: 77 m (253 ft)
- Population (2023): 120
  - Density: 15/km^{2} (38/sq mi)
- Time zone: UTC+01:00 (CET)
  - Summer (DST): UTC+02:00 (CEST)
- INSEE/Postal code: 80042 /80600
- ^{1} French Land Register data, which excludes lakes, ponds, glaciers > 1 km^{2} (0.386 sq mi or 247 acres) and river estuaries.

Autheux (French pronunciation: [otø]) is a commune in the Somme department in Hauts-de-France in northern France.

== See also ==
- Communes of the Somme department
