= Le Meillard =

- Commune
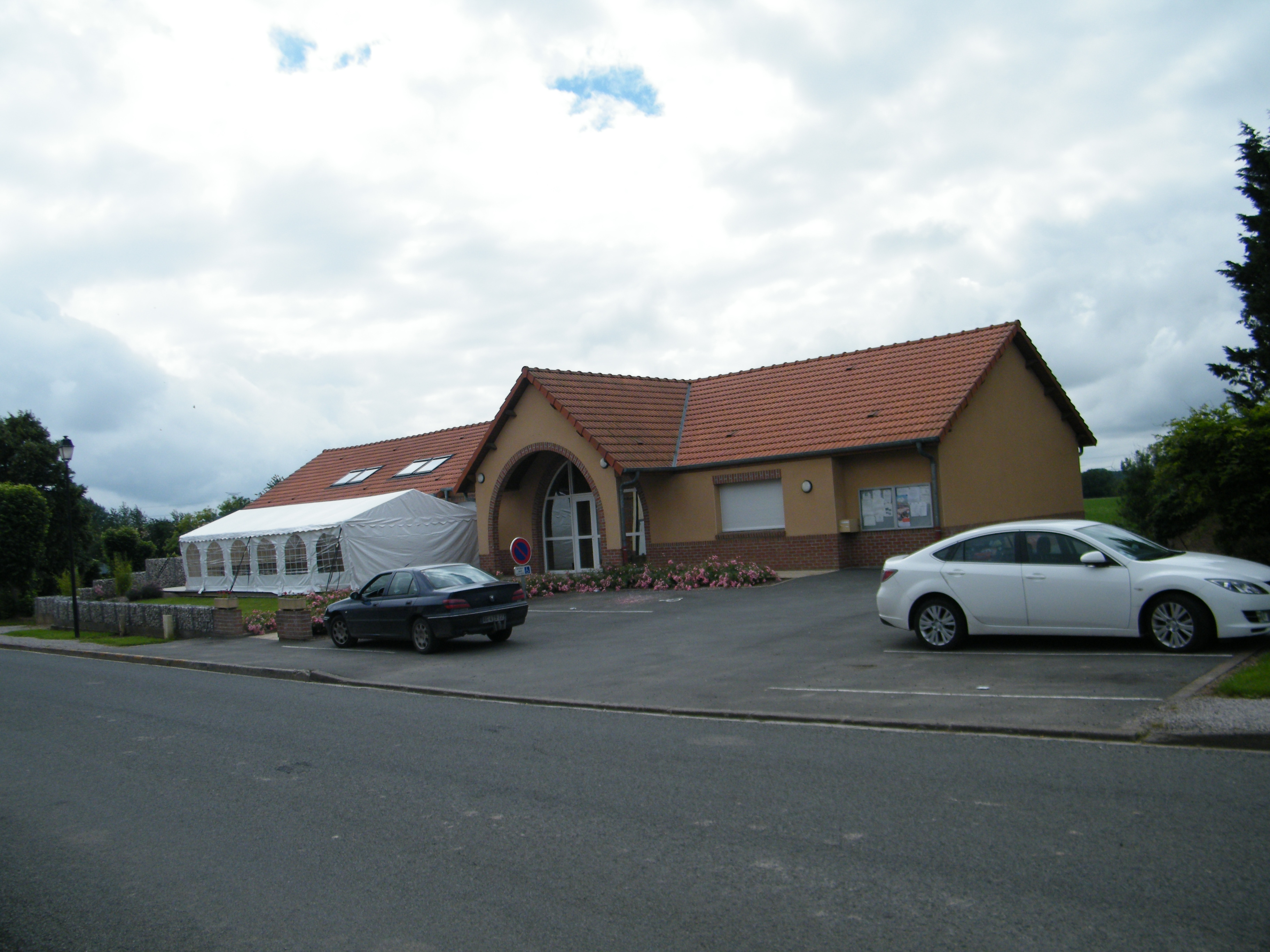
- The town hall in Le Meillard
- Location of Le Meillard
- Location within France Location within Hauts-de-France
- Coordinates: 50°10′19″N 2°11′45″E
- Country: France
- Region: Hauts-de-France
- Department: Somme
- Arrondissement: Amiens
- Canton: Doullens
- Intercommunality: CC Territoire Nord Picardie

Government
  - Mayor (2020–2026): Jean-Pierre Cardon
- Area^{1}: 6.93 km^{2} (2.68 sq mi)
- Elevation: 80 m (260 ft)
- Highest elevation: 142 m (466 ft)
- Lowest elevation: 55 m (180 ft)
- Population (2023): 154
  - Density: 22.2/km^{2} (57.6/sq mi)
- Time zone: UTC+01:00 (CET)
  - Summer (DST): UTC+02:00 (CEST)
- INSEE/Postal code: 80526 /80370
- ^{1} French Land Register data, which excludes lakes, ponds, glaciers > 1 km^{2} (0.386 sq mi or 247 acres) and river estuaries.

Le Meillard (French pronunciation: [lə mɛjaʁ]) is a commune in the Somme department in Hauts-de-France in northern France.

== Geography ==
Le Meillard is situated on the D28 road, some 12 miles (19 km) northeast of Abbeville.

== Population ==
Historical population
Year	Pop.	±% p.a.
1968	197	—
1975	163	−2.67%
1982	134	−2.76%
1990	114	−2.00%
1999	131	+1.56%
2007	147	+1.45%
2012	163	+2.09%
2017	154	−1.13%
2023	154	+0.00%
Source: INSEE

== See also ==
- Communes of the Somme department
