= Candas =

- Commune
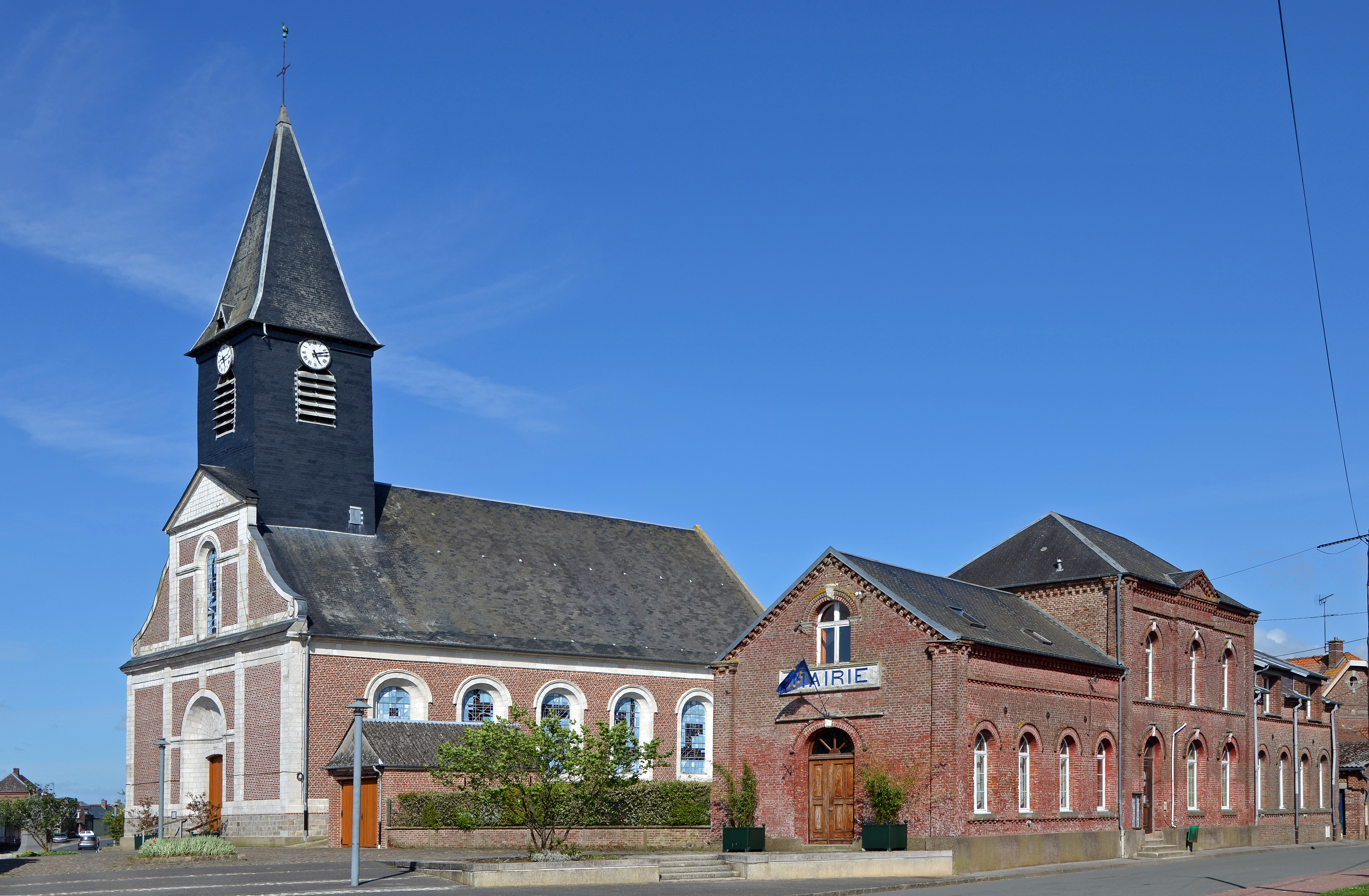
- The church and town hall in Candas

- Coat of arms
- Location of Candas
- Location within France Location within Hauts-de-France
- Coordinates: 50°06′29″N 2°15′37″E
- Country: France
- Region: Hauts-de-France
- Department: Somme
- Arrondissement: Amiens
- Canton: Doullens
- Intercommunality: CC Territoire Nord Picardie

Government
  - Mayor (2020–2026): Dominique Hersin
- Area^{1}: 17.27 km^{2} (6.67 sq mi)
- Elevation: 146 m (479 ft)
- Highest elevation: 166 m (545 ft)
- Lowest elevation: 97 m (318 ft)
- Population (2023): 1,035
  - Density: 59.93/km^{2} (155.2/sq mi)
- Time zone: UTC+01:00 (CET)
  - Summer (DST): UTC+02:00 (CEST)
- INSEE/Postal code: 80168 /80750
- ^{1} French Land Register data, which excludes lakes, ponds, glaciers > 1 km^{2} (0.386 sq mi or 247 acres) and river estuaries.

Candas (French pronunciation: [kɑ̃da]; Picard: L’Cando) is a commune in the Somme department in Hauts-de-France in northern France.

== Geography ==
Candas is situated on the D31 and D49 crossroads, some 21 miles (34 km) north of Amiens.

== Places of interest ==
- Fanchon's windmill

The sails stopped turning in 1923, on the death of the last miller, Louis Fanchon (who acquired the mill in 1882). The building was left to nature, and was soon covered in moss and grass, with bushes growing through every opening. Much of the structure began to crumble. After more than 10 years of restoration, thanks to the dynamism of the 'Association de Sauvegarde du Patrimoine de Candas, the mill is now open to the public. There's a guided tour and demonstrations of flour production.

== See also ==
- Communes of the Somme department
