= Maizicourt =

- Commune
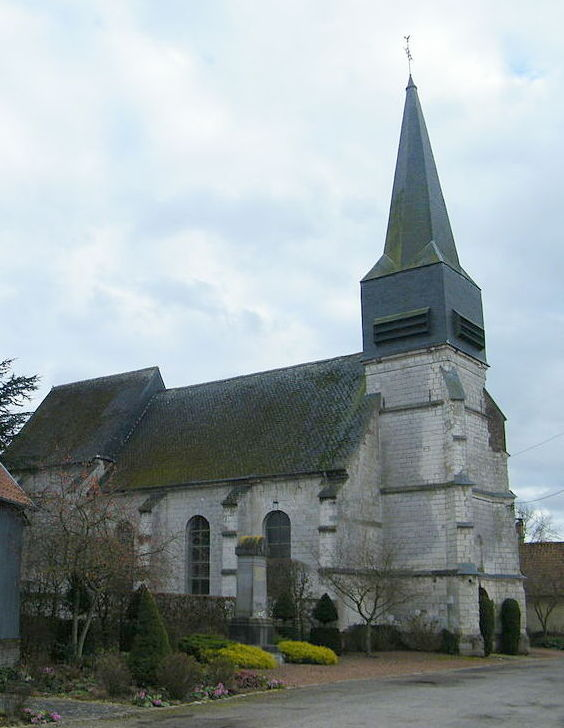
- The church in Maizicourt
- Location of Maizicourt
- Location within France Location within Hauts-de-France
- Coordinates: 50°11′47″N 2°07′24″E
- Country: France
- Region: Hauts-de-France
- Department: Somme
- Arrondissement: Amiens
- Canton: Doullens
- Intercommunality: CC Territoire Nord Picardie

Government
  - Mayor (2020–2026): Antoine Septier
- Area^{1}: 5.8 km^{2} (2.2 sq mi)
- Elevation: 110 m (360 ft)
- Highest elevation: 136 m (446 ft)
- Lowest elevation: 53 m (174 ft)
- Population (2023): 182
  - Density: 31/km^{2} (81/sq mi)
- Time zone: UTC+01:00 (CET)
  - Summer (DST): UTC+02:00 (CEST)
- INSEE/Postal code: 80503 /80370
- ^{1} French Land Register data, which excludes lakes, ponds, glaciers > 1 km^{2} (0.386 sq mi or 247 acres) and river estuaries.

Maizicourt (French pronunciation: [mɛzikuʁ]) is a commune in the Somme département in Hauts-de-France in northern France.

== Geography ==
Maizicourt is situated on the D933 road, some 15 miles (24 km) northeast of Abbeville.

== Population ==
Historical population
Year	Pop.	±% p.a.
1968	243	—
1975	266	+1.30%
1982	236	−1.69%
1990	189	−2.74%
1999	171	−1.11%
2007	176	+0.36%
2012	189	+1.44%
2017	192	+0.32%
2023	182	−0.89%
Source: INSEE

== See also ==
- Communes of the Somme department
