= Occoches =

- Commune
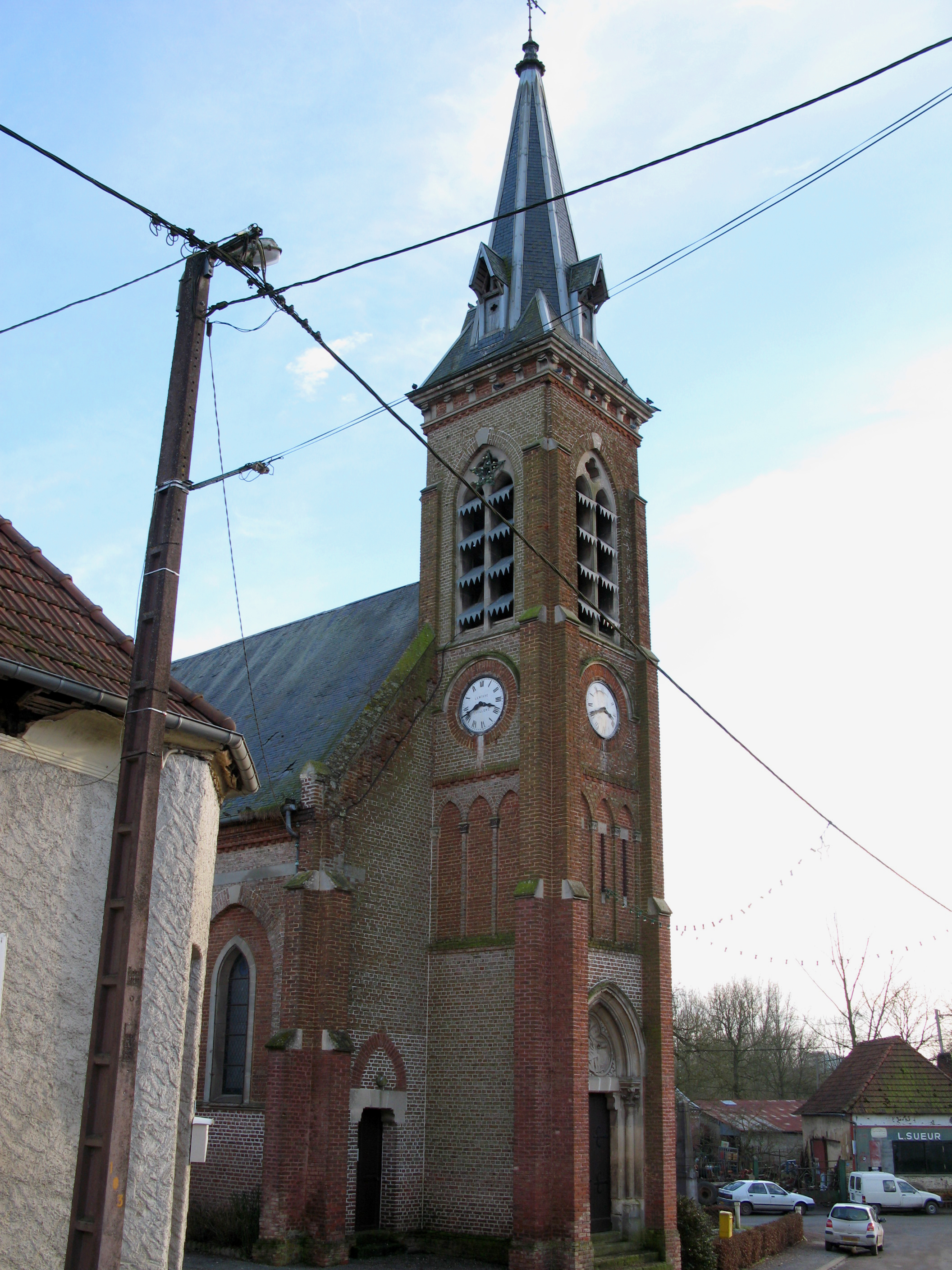
- The church in Occoches

- Coat of arms
- Location of Occoches
- Location within France Location within Hauts-de-France
- Coordinates: 50°10′30″N 2°16′18″E
- Country: France
- Region: Hauts-de-France
- Department: Somme
- Arrondissement: Amiens
- Canton: Doullens
- Intercommunality: CC Territoire Nord Picardie

Government
  - Mayor (2020–2026): Sylvain Dessaint
- Area^{1}: 7.09 km^{2} (2.74 sq mi)
- Elevation: 70 m (230 ft)
- Highest elevation: 136 m (446 ft)
- Lowest elevation: 45 m (148 ft)
- Population (2023): 121
  - Density: 17.1/km^{2} (44.2/sq mi)
- Time zone: UTC+01:00 (CET)
  - Summer (DST): UTC+02:00 (CEST)
- INSEE/Postal code: 80602 /80600
- ^{1} French Land Register data, which excludes lakes, ponds, glaciers > 1 km^{2} (0.386 sq mi or 247 acres) and river estuaries.

Occoches (French pronunciation: [ɔkɔʃ]) is a commune in the Somme department in Hauts-de-France in northern France.

== Geography ==
Occoches is situated on the D938 road, some 20 miles (32 km) east-northeast of Abbeville, by the banks of the river Authie, on the border with the Pas-de-Calais département.

== Population ==
Historical population
Year	Pop.	±% p.a.
1968	142	—
1975	135	−0.72%
1982	133	−0.21%
1990	137	+0.37%
1999	121	−1.37%
2007	129	+0.80%
2012	124	−0.79%
2017	127	+0.48%
2023	121	−0.80%
Source: INSEE

== See also ==
- Communes of the Somme department
