= Gorges, Somme =

Gorges
- Commune
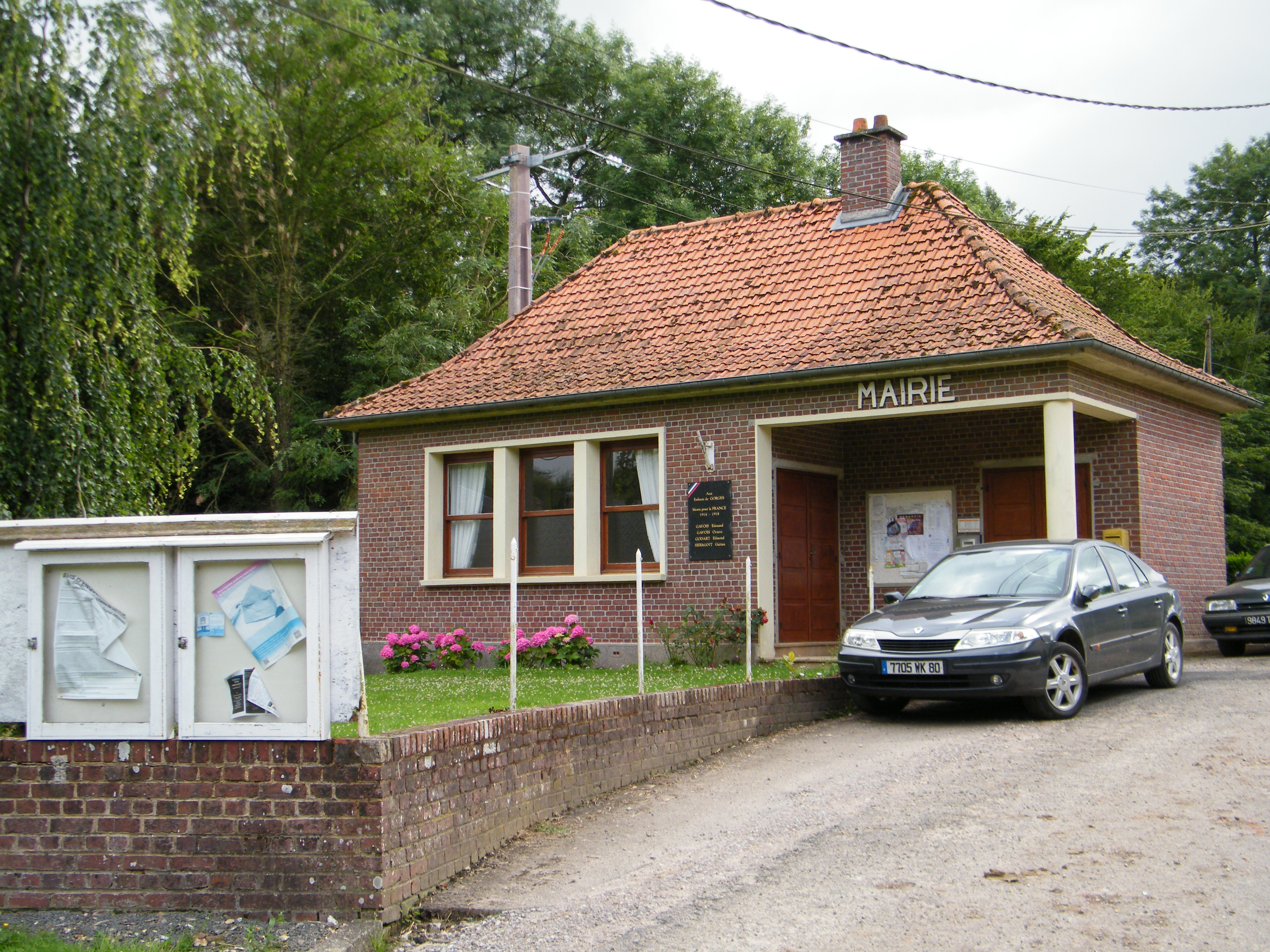
- The town hall in Gorges
- Location of Gorges
- Location within France Location within Hauts-de-France
- Coordinates: 50°06′37″N 2°10′43″E
- Country: France
- Region: Hauts-de-France
- Department: Somme
- Arrondissement: Amiens
- Canton: Doullens
- Intercommunality: CC Territoire Nord Picardie

Government
  - Mayor (2020–2026): Guy Delattre
- Area^{1}: 4.87 km^{2} (1.88 sq mi)
- Elevation: 135 m (443 ft)
- Highest elevation: 147 m (482 ft)
- Lowest elevation: 95 m (312 ft)
- Population (2023): 40
  - Density: 8.2/km^{2} (21/sq mi)
- Time zone: UTC+01:00 (CET)
  - Summer (DST): UTC+02:00 (CEST)
- INSEE/Postal code: 80381 /80370
- ^{1} French Land Register data, which excludes lakes, ponds, glaciers > 1 km^{2} (0.386 sq mi or 247 acres) and river estuaries.

Gorges (French pronunciation: [ɡɔʁʒ]) is a commune in the Somme department in Hauts-de-France in northern France.

== Geography ==
Gorges is situated on the D933 road, some 20 miles (32 km) east of Abbeville.

== Population ==
Historical population

Year	Pop.	±% p.a.
1836	200	—
1896	126	−0.77%
1962	62	−1.07%
1968	70	+2.04%
1975	53	−3.90%
1982	44	−2.62%

Year	Pop.	±% p.a.
1990	42	−0.58%
1999	47	+1.26%
2007	43	−1.11%
2012	42	−0.47%
2017	40	−0.97%
2023	40	+0.00%

Source: EHESS and INSEE (1968–2023)

== World War II ==
After the liberation of the area by Allied Forces in 1944, engineers of the Ninth Air Force IX Engineering Command began construction of a combat Advanced Landing Ground outside of the town. Declared operational on 16 August, the airfield was designated as "A-26", it was used by the 379th Bombardment Group which flew Martin B-26 Marauder medium bombers until early September when the unit moved into Central France. Afterward, the airfield was closed.

== See also ==
- Communes of the Somme department
