= Boufflers (disambiguation) =

Boufflers is a commune in France.

Boufflers may also refer to:

- Louis François, duc de Boufflers (1644-1711), French soldier and aristocrat
- Louis Franois, Marquis de Boufflers (1714-1752), French soldier and aristocrat
- Stanislas Jean, chevalier de Boufflers (1738-1815), a French writer
