= Machy =

Machy may refer to:

- -machy, suffix meaning a fight or battle
- Machy, Aube, a commune in the department of Aube, France
- Machy, Somme, a commune in the department of Somme, France
- Le Sieur de Machy, a French composer
