= Regnière-Écluse =

- Commune
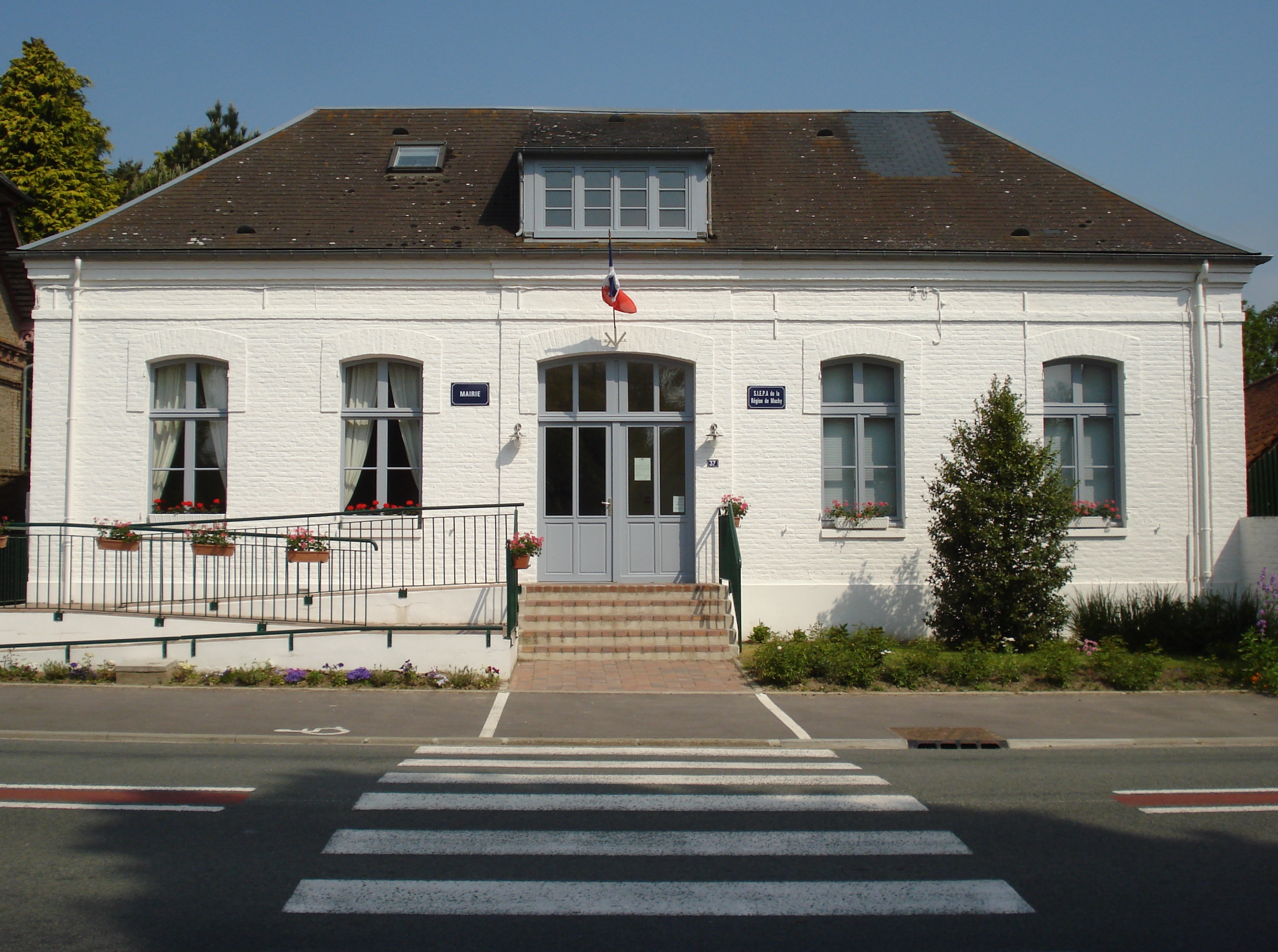
- Town hall.
- Location of Regnière-Écluse
- Location within France Location within Hauts-de-France
- Coordinates: 50°16′54″N 1°46′05″E
- Country: France
- Region: Hauts-de-France
- Department: Somme
- Arrondissement: Abbeville
- Canton: Rue
- Intercommunality: CC Ponthieu-Marquenterre

Government
  - Mayor (2020–2026): Patrick Bost
- Area^{1}: 9.54 km^{2} (3.68 sq mi)
- Elevation: 17 m (56 ft)
- Highest elevation: 60 m (200 ft)
- Lowest elevation: 5 m (16 ft)
- Population (2023): 139
  - Density: 14.6/km^{2} (37.7/sq mi)
- Time zone: UTC+01:00 (CET)
  - Summer (DST): UTC+02:00 (CEST)
- INSEE/Postal code: 80665 /80120
- ^{1} French Land Register data, which excludes lakes, ponds, glaciers > 1 km^{2} (0.386 sq mi or 247 acres) and river estuaries.

Regnière-Écluse is a commune in the Somme department in Hauts-de-France in northern France.

== Geography ==
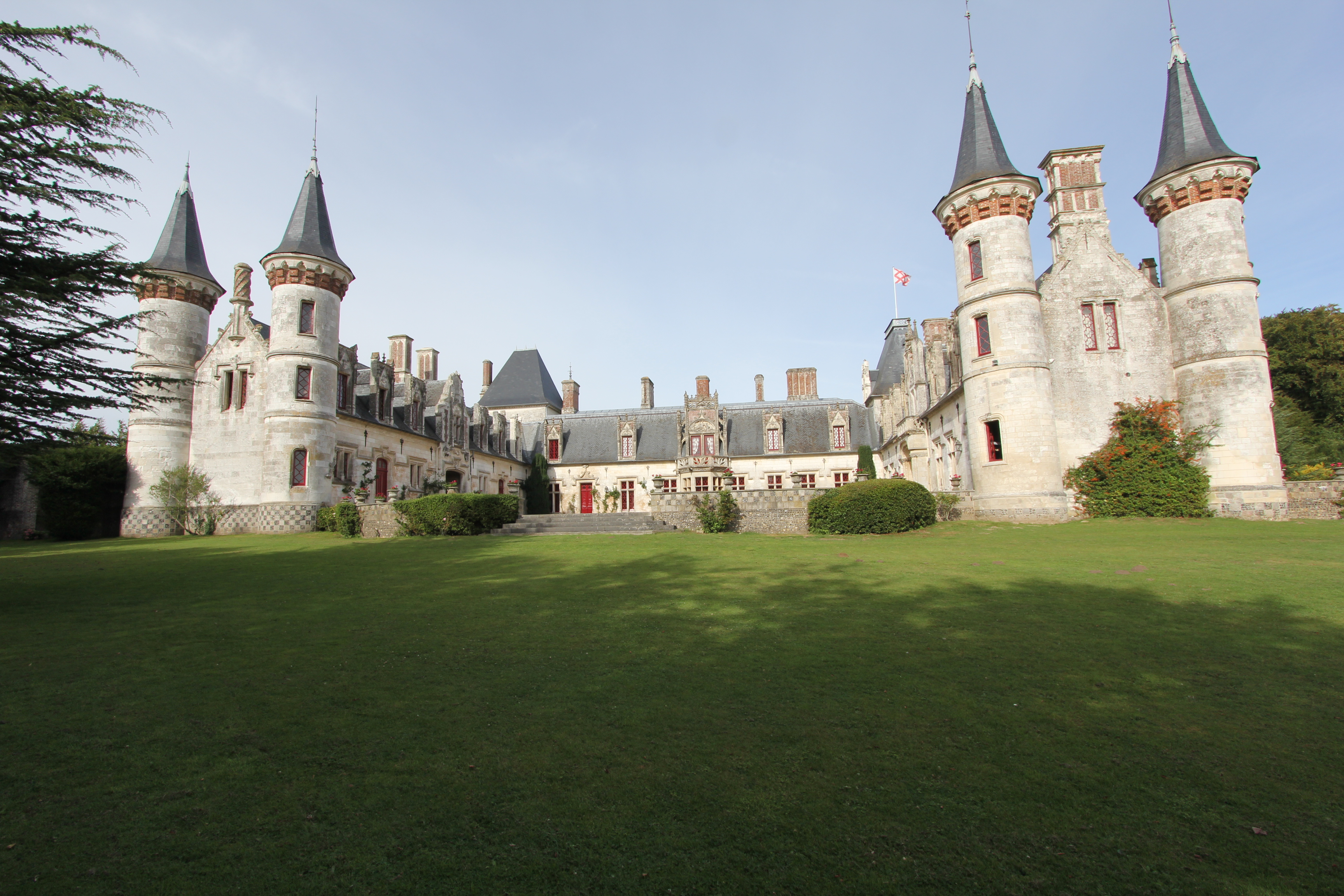
Castle in Regnière.

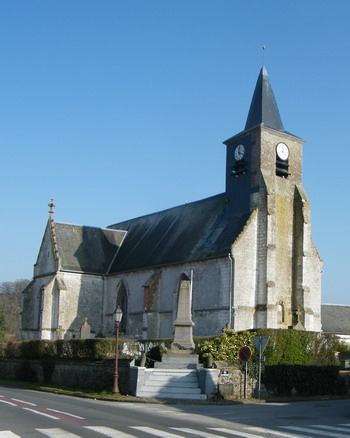
Church in Regnière and world war memorial.

The commune is situated some 14 miles (23 km) north of Abbeville, on the D938 road and surrounded by the forest of Crécy-en-Ponthieu.

== Population ==
Historical population
Year	Pop.	±% p.a.
1968	157	—
1975	154	−0.28%
1982	120	−3.50%
1990	125	+0.51%
1999	122	−0.27%
2007	136	+1.37%
2012	133	−0.45%
2017	126	−1.08%
2023	139	+1.65%
Source: INSEE

== See also ==
- Communes of the Somme department
