= Brucamps =

- Commune
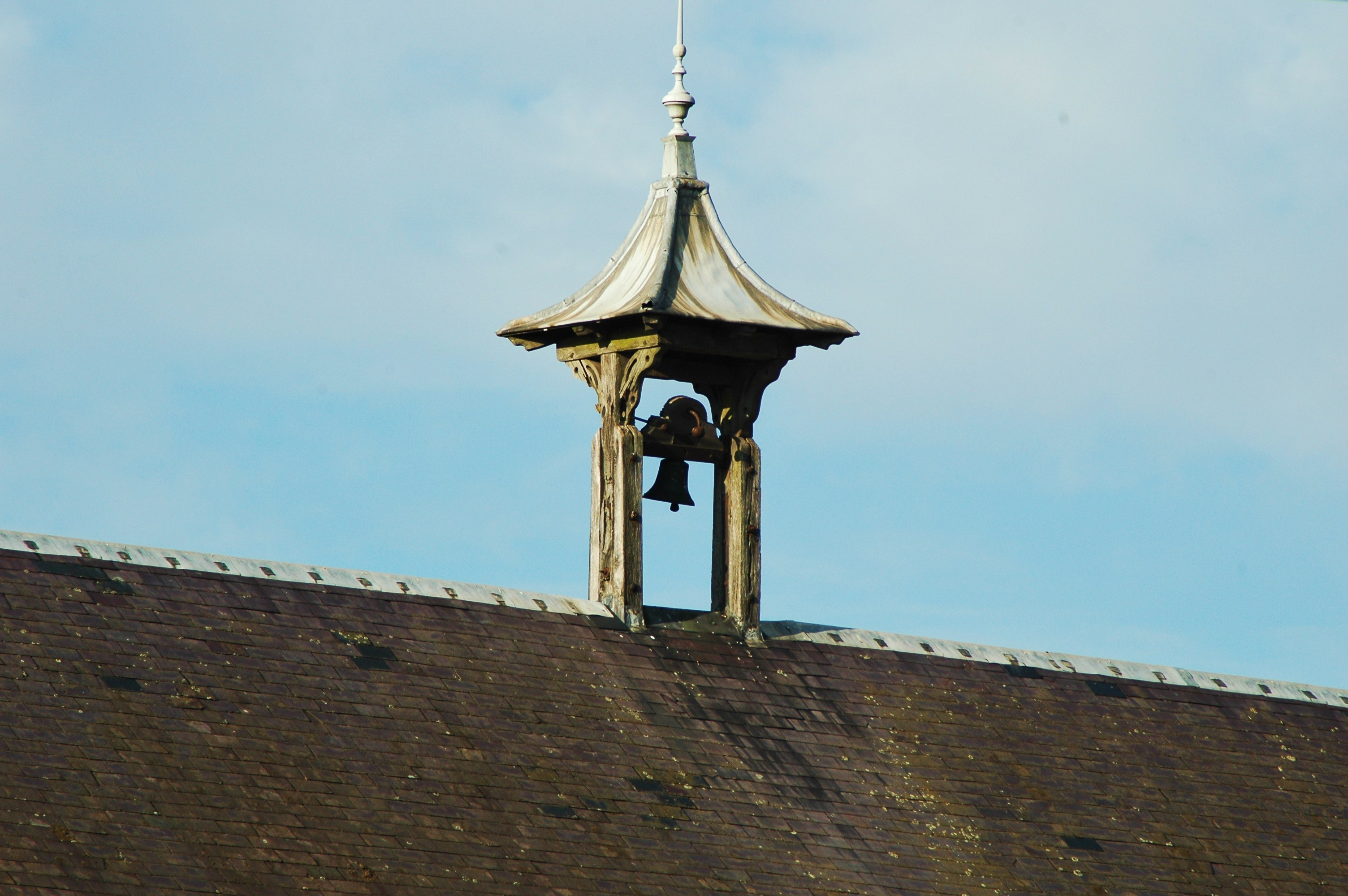
- The bell of the old school in Brucamps

- Coat of arms
- Location of Brucamps
- Location within France Location within Hauts-de-France
- Coordinates: 50°04′24″N 2°03′29″E
- Country: France
- Region: Hauts-de-France
- Department: Somme
- Arrondissement: Abbeville
- Canton: Rue
- Intercommunality: CC Ponthieu-Marquenterre

Government
  - Mayor (2020–2026): Marcel Gamard
- Area^{1}: 6.37 km^{2} (2.46 sq mi)
- Elevation: 47 m (154 ft)
- Highest elevation: 115 m (377 ft)
- Lowest elevation: 54 m (177 ft)
- Population (2023): 155
  - Density: 24.3/km^{2} (63.0/sq mi)
- Time zone: UTC+01:00 (CET)
  - Summer (DST): UTC+02:00 (CEST)
- INSEE/Postal code: 80145 /80690
- ^{1} French Land Register data, which excludes lakes, ponds, glaciers > 1 km^{2} (0.386 sq mi or 247 acres) and river estuaries.

Brucamps (French pronunciation: [bʁykɑ̃]) is a commune in the Somme department in Hauts-de-France in northern France.

== Geography ==
Brucamps is situated on the D158 road, some 14 miles (23 km) east of Abbeville.

== Population ==
Historical population
Year	Pop.	±% p.a.
1968	159	—
1975	133	−2.52%
1982	124	−1.00%
1990	121	−0.31%
1999	109	−1.15%
2007	137	+2.90%
2012	142	+0.72%
2017	139	−0.43%
2023	155	+1.83%
Source: INSEE

== See also ==
- Communes of the Somme department
