= Froyelles =

- Commune
- The town hall in Froyelles

- Coat of arms
- Location of Froyelles
- Location within France Location within Hauts-de-France
- Coordinates: 50°13′42″N 1°55′43″E
- Country: France
- Region: Hauts-de-France
- Department: Somme
- Arrondissement: Abbeville
- Canton: Rue
- Intercommunality: CC Ponthieu-Marquenterre

Government
  - Mayor (2020–2026): Bruno Guillot
- Area^{1}: 2.79 km^{2} (1.08 sq mi)
- Elevation: 75 m (246 ft)
- Highest elevation: 82 m (269 ft)
- Lowest elevation: 49 m (161 ft)
- Population (2023): 96
  - Density: 34/km^{2} (89/sq mi)
- Time zone: UTC+01:00 (CET)
  - Summer (DST): UTC+02:00 (CEST)
- INSEE/Postal code: 80371 /80150
- ^{1} French Land Register data, which excludes lakes, ponds, glaciers > 1 km^{2} (0.386 sq mi or 247 acres) and river estuaries.

Froyelles is a commune in the Somme department in Hauts-de-France in northern France.

== Geography ==
Froyelles is situated on the D928 road, some 13 miles (21 km) northeast of Abbeville.

== Population ==
Historical population
| Year | Pop. | ±% p.a. |
|---|---|---|
| 1968 | 68 | — |
| 1975 | 59 | −2.01% |
| 1982 | 56 | −0.74% |
| 1990 | 55 | −0.22% |
| 1999 | 66 | +2.05% |
| 2007 | 96 | +4.80% |
| 2012 | 115 | +3.68% |
| 2017 | 105 | −1.80% |
| 2023 | 96 | −1.48% |
Source: INSEE

== See also ==
- Communes of the Somme department
