= Yvrencheux =

- Commune
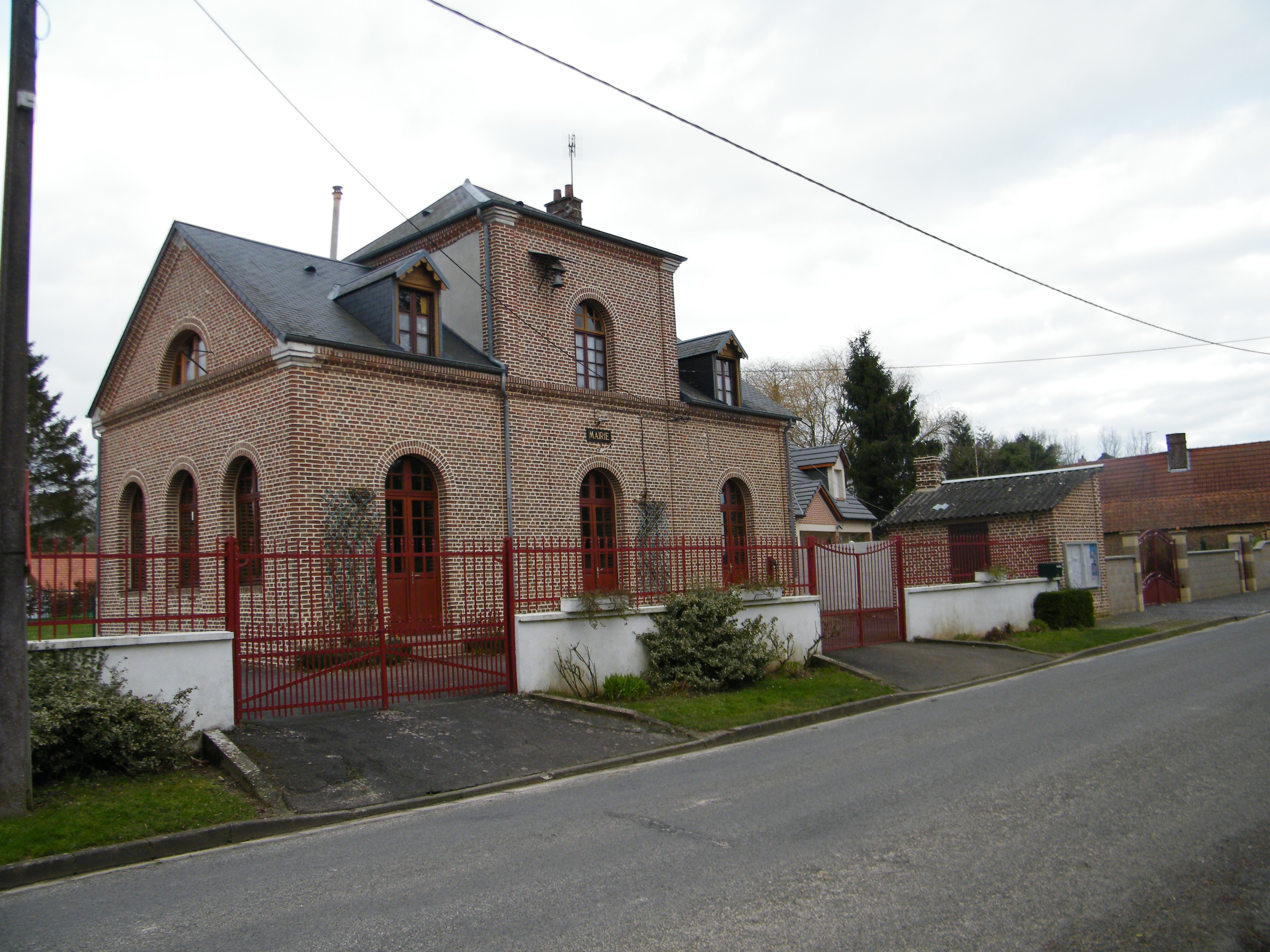
- The town hall in Yvrencheux

- Coat of arms
- Location of Yvrencheux
- Location within France Location within Hauts-de-France
- Coordinates: 50°10′56″N 1°59′35″E
- Country: France
- Region: Hauts-de-France
- Department: Somme
- Arrondissement: Abbeville
- Canton: Rue
- Intercommunality: Ponthieu-Marquenterre

Government
  - Mayor (2020–2026): Thierry Miannay
- Area^{1}: 6.01 km^{2} (2.32 sq mi)
- Elevation: 142 m (466 ft)
- Highest elevation: 119 m (390 ft)
- Lowest elevation: 73 m (240 ft)
- Population (2023): 130
  - Density: 22/km^{2} (56/sq mi)
- Time zone: UTC+01:00 (CET)
  - Summer (DST): UTC+02:00 (CEST)
- INSEE/Postal code: 80833 /80150
- ^{1} French Land Register data, which excludes lakes, ponds, glaciers > 1 km^{2} (0.386 sq mi or 247 acres) and river estuaries.

Yvrencheux (French pronunciation: [ivʁɑ̃ʃø]) is a commune in the Somme department in Hauts-de-France in northern France.

== Geography ==
Yvrencheux is situated 10 miles (16 km) northeast of Abbeville, on the D256a road

== Population ==
Historical population

Year	Pop.	±% p.a.
1793	504	—
1821	540	+0.25%
1846	510	−0.23%
1872	490	−0.15%
1901	303	−1.64%
1926	244	−0.86%
1946	209	−0.77%
1962	209	+0.00%
1968	194	−1.23%

Year	Pop.	±% p.a.
1975	179	−1.14%
1982	175	−0.32%
1990	165	−0.73%
1999	138	−1.97%
2007	150	+1.05%
2012	142	−1.09%
2017	127	−2.21%
2023	130	+0.39%

Source: EHESS (1793-1999) and INSEE

== See also ==
- Communes of the Somme department
