= Brailly-Cornehotte =

- Commune
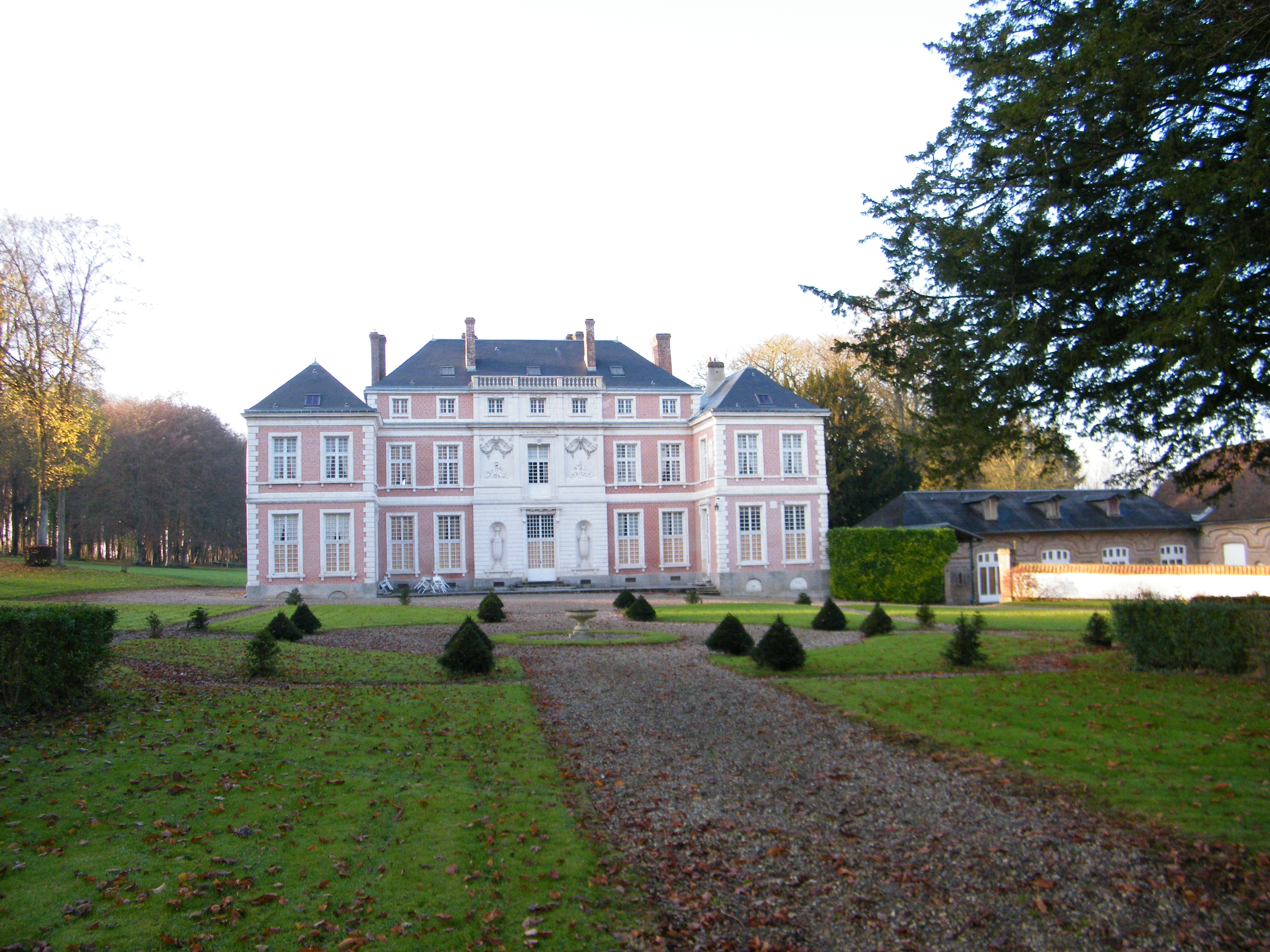
- The chateau of Brailly-Cornehotte

- Coat of arms
- Location of Brailly-Cornehotte
- Location within France Location within Hauts-de-France
- Coordinates: 50°13′05″N 1°57′36″E
- Country: France
- Region: Hauts-de-France
- Department: Somme
- Arrondissement: Abbeville
- Canton: Rue
- Intercommunality: CC Ponthieu-Marquenterre

Government
  - Mayor (2020–2026): Xavier Bordet
- Area^{1}: 11.5 km^{2} (4.4 sq mi)
- Elevation: 60 m (200 ft)
- Highest elevation: 91 m (299 ft)
- Lowest elevation: 47 m (154 ft)
- Population (2023): 211
  - Density: 18.3/km^{2} (47.5/sq mi)
- Time zone: UTC+01:00 (CET)
  - Summer (DST): UTC+02:00 (CEST)
- INSEE/Postal code: 80133 /80150
- ^{1} French Land Register data, which excludes lakes, ponds, glaciers > 1 km^{2} (0.386 sq mi or 247 acres) and river estuaries.

Brailly-Cornehotte is a commune in the Somme department in Hauts-de-France in northern France.

== Geography ==
The commune is situated on the D56 road, some 14 miles (23 km) northeast of Abbeville.

== Population ==
Historical population
Year	Pop.	±% p.a.
1968	324	—
1975	281	−2.01%
1982	255	−1.38%
1990	233	−1.12%
1999	240	+0.33%
2007	237	−0.16%
2012	241	+0.34%
2017	241	+0.00%
2023	211	−2.19%
Source: INSEE

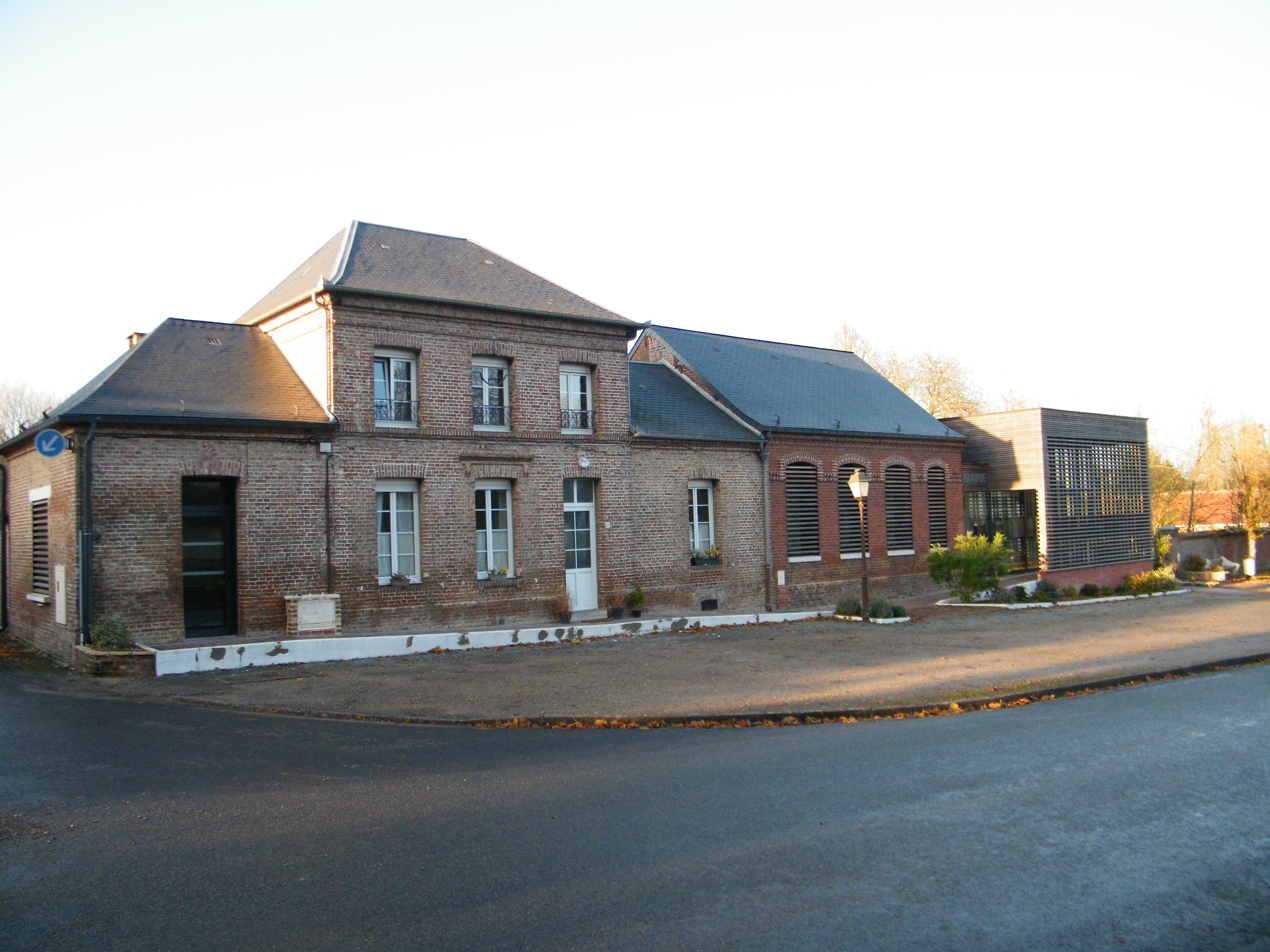
Town hall.

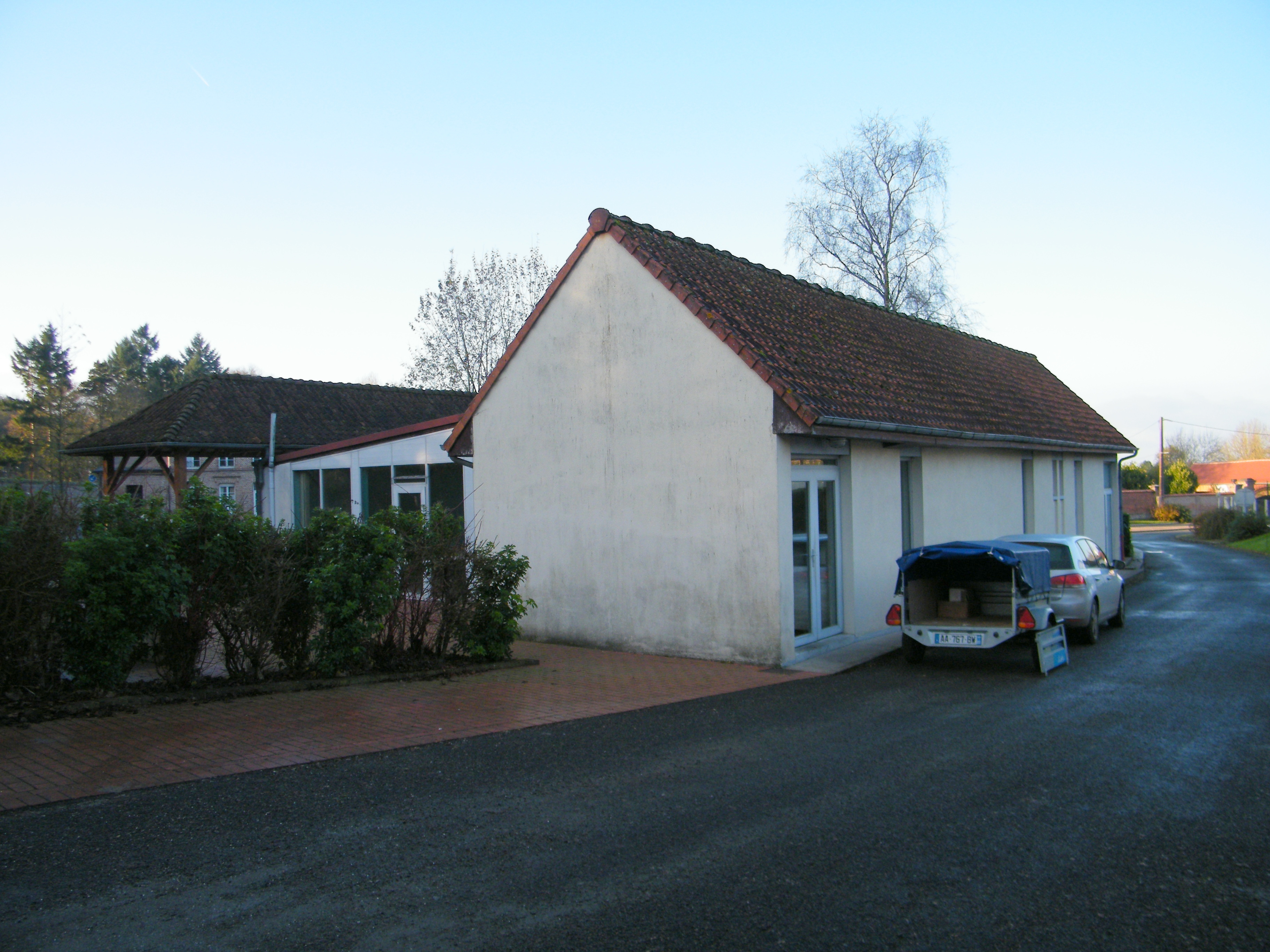
Community hall.

== See also ==
- Communes of the Somme department
