= Neuilly-le-Dien =

- Commune
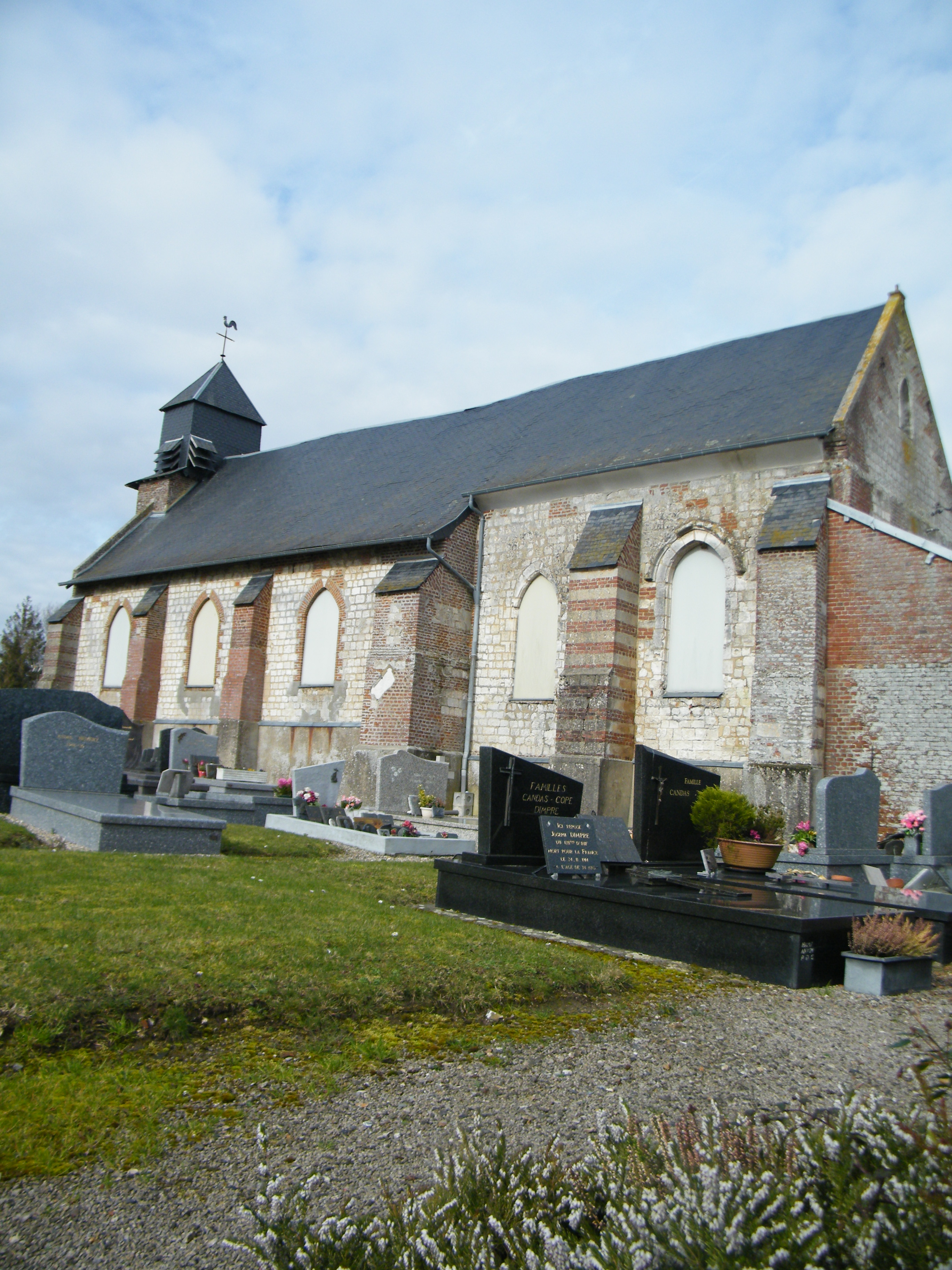
- The church in Neuillly-le-Dien

- Coat of arms
- Location of Neuilly-le-Dien
- Location within France Location within Hauts-de-France
- Coordinates: 50°13′28″N 2°02′37″E
- Country: France
- Region: Hauts-de-France
- Department: Somme
- Arrondissement: Abbeville
- Canton: Rue
- Intercommunality: CC Ponthieu-Marquenterre

Government
  - Mayor (2020–2026): Philippe Sellier
- Area^{1}: 4.9 km^{2} (1.9 sq mi)
- Elevation: 100 m (330 ft)
- Highest elevation: 101 m (331 ft)
- Lowest elevation: 40 m (130 ft)
- Population (2023): 106
  - Density: 22/km^{2} (56/sq mi)
- Time zone: UTC+01:00 (CET)
  - Summer (DST): UTC+02:00 (CEST)
- INSEE/Postal code: 80589 /80150
- ^{1} French Land Register data, which excludes lakes, ponds, glaciers > 1 km^{2} (0.386 sq mi or 247 acres) and river estuaries.

Neuilly-le-Dien (French pronunciation: [nœji lə djɛ̃]) is a commune in the Somme department in Hauts-de-France in northern France.

== Geography ==
The commune is situated on the D938 road, some 15 miles (24 km) northeast of Abbeville.

== Population ==
Historical population
Year	Pop.	±% p.a.
1968	154	—
1975	114	−4.21%
1982	97	−2.28%
1990	103	+0.75%
1999	110	+0.73%
2007	105	−0.58%
2012	94	−2.19%
2017	96	+0.42%
2023	106	+1.67%
Source: INSEE

== See also ==
- Communes of the Somme department
