= Vironchaux =

- Commune
- The town hall in Vironchaux

- Coat of arms
- Location of Vironchaux
- Location within France Location within Hauts-de-France
- Coordinates: 50°17′23″N 1°49′22″E
- Country: France
- Region: Hauts-de-France
- Department: Somme
- Arrondissement: Abbeville
- Canton: Rue
- Intercommunality: CC Ponthieu-Marquenterre

Government
  - Mayor (2020–2026): Patricia Poupart
- Area^{1}: 16.14 km^{2} (6.23 sq mi)
- Elevation: 45 m (148 ft)
- Highest elevation: 72 m (236 ft)
- Lowest elevation: 24 m (79 ft)
- Population (2023): 503
  - Density: 31.2/km^{2} (80.7/sq mi)
- Time zone: UTC+01:00 (CET)
  - Summer (DST): UTC+02:00 (CEST)
- INSEE/Postal code: 80808 /80150
- ^{1} French Land Register data, which excludes lakes, ponds, glaciers > 1 km^{2} (0.386 sq mi or 247 acres) and river estuaries.

Vironchaux (French pronunciation: [viʁɔ̃ʃo]) is a commune in the Somme department in Hauts-de-France in northern France.

== Geography ==
Vironchaux is situated 14 miles(22.5 km) north of Abbeville, on the D16 road.

== Population ==
Historical population
Year	Pop.	±% p.a.
1968	421	—
1975	440	+0.63%
1982	452	+0.39%
1990	427	−0.71%
1999	383	−1.20%
2007	433	+1.55%
2012	443	+0.46%
2017	491	+2.08%
2023	503	+0.40%
Source: INSEE

== See also ==
- Communes of the Somme department
