= Mouflers =

- Commune
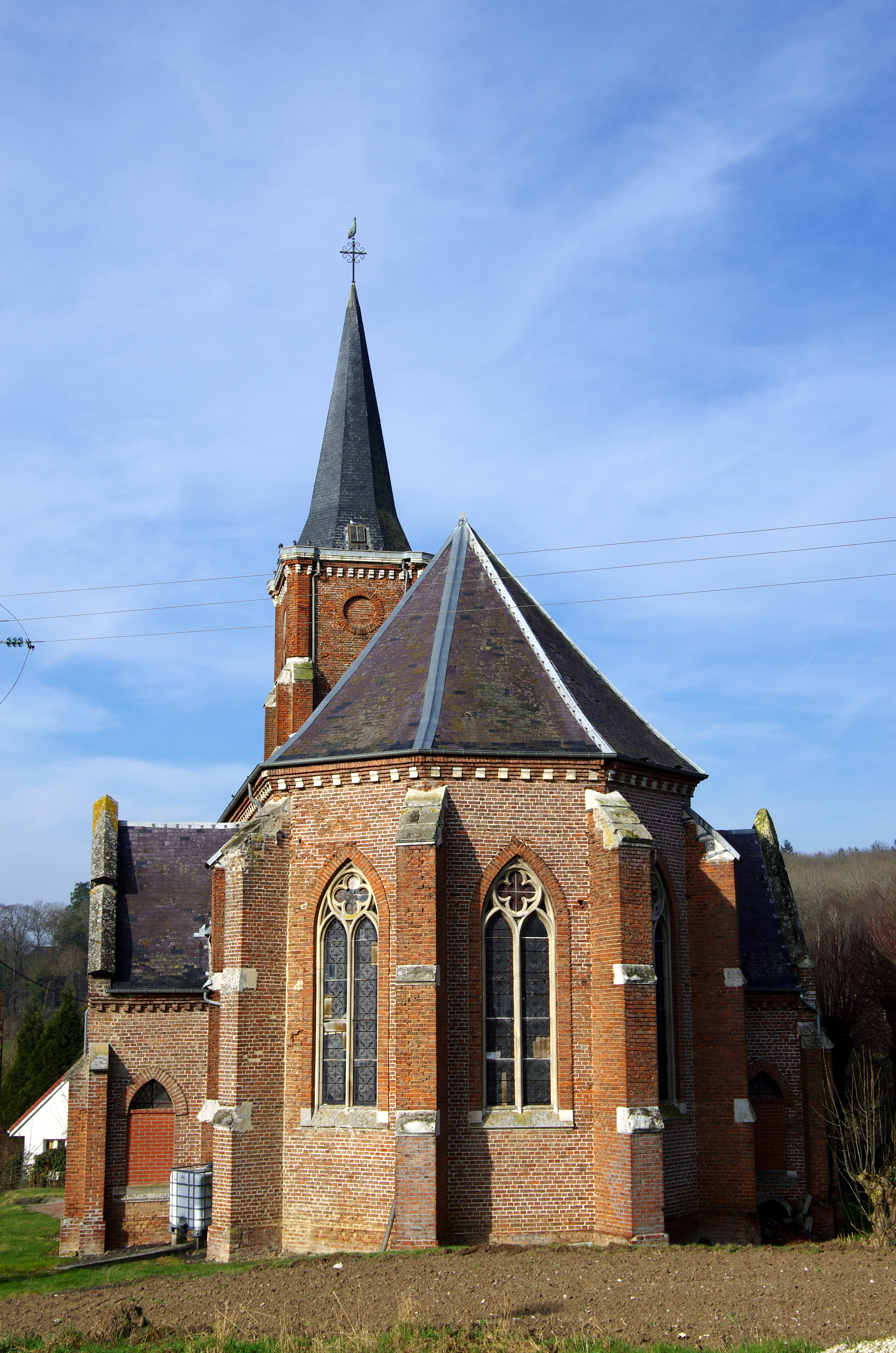
- The church in Mouflers
- Location of Mouflers
- Location within France Location within Hauts-de-France
- Coordinates: 50°02′52″N 2°02′59″E
- Country: France
- Region: Hauts-de-France
- Department: Somme
- Arrondissement: Abbeville
- Canton: Rue
- Intercommunality: CC Ponthieu-Marquenterre

Government
  - Mayor (2020–2026): Yves Crepy
- Area^{1}: 3.53 km^{2} (1.36 sq mi)
- Elevation: 84 m (276 ft)
- Highest elevation: 113 m (371 ft)
- Lowest elevation: 30 m (98 ft)
- Population (2023): 96
  - Density: 27/km^{2} (70/sq mi)
- Time zone: UTC+01:00 (CET)
  - Summer (DST): UTC+02:00 (CEST)
- INSEE/Postal code: 80574 /80690
- ^{1} French Land Register data, which excludes lakes, ponds, glaciers > 1 km^{2} (0.386 sq mi or 247 acres) and river estuaries.

Mouflers is a commune in the Somme department in Hauts-de-France in northern France.

== Geography ==
Mouflers is situated on the N1 road, some 12 miles (19 km) southeast of Abbeville.

== Population ==
Historical population
Year	Pop.	±% p.a.
1968	101	—
1975	74	−4.35%
1982	80	+1.12%
1990	99	+2.70%
1999	83	−1.94%
2007	88	+0.73%
2012	86	−0.46%
2017	93	+1.58%
2023	96	+0.53%
Source: INSEE

== See also ==
- Communes of the Somme department
