= Francières, Somme =

Francières
- Commune
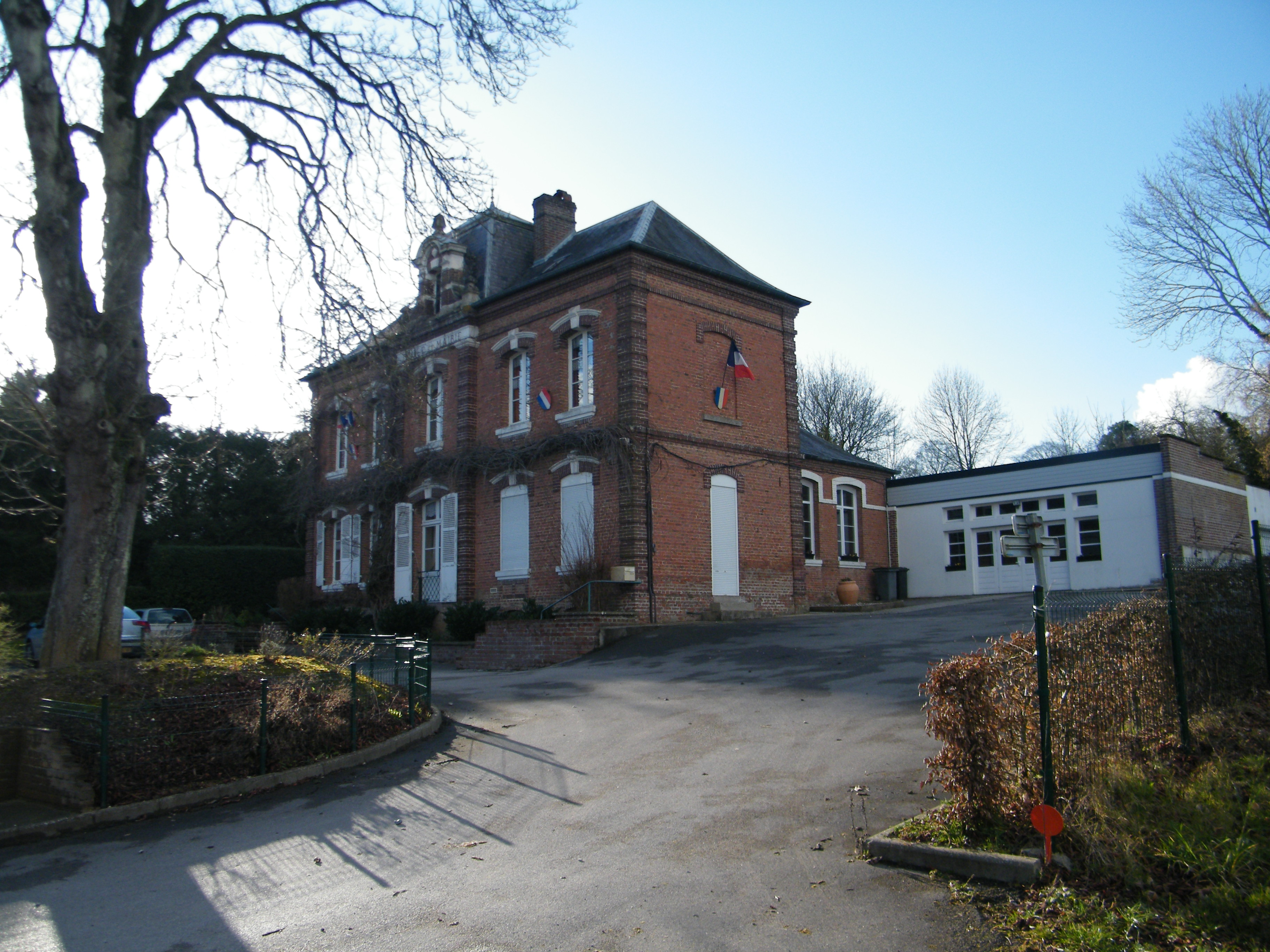
- The town hall and school in Francières

- Coat of arms
- Location of Francières
- Location within France Location within Hauts-de-France
- Coordinates: 50°04′23″N 1°56′33″E
- Country: France
- Region: Hauts-de-France
- Department: Somme
- Arrondissement: Abbeville
- Canton: Rue
- Intercommunality: CC Ponthieu-Marquenterre

Government
  - Mayor (2020–2026): Jean-Claude Dulys
- Area^{1}: 5.81 km^{2} (2.24 sq mi)
- Elevation: 70 m (230 ft)
- Highest elevation: 110 m (360 ft)
- Lowest elevation: 33 m (108 ft)
- Population (2023): 176
  - Density: 30.3/km^{2} (78.5/sq mi)
- Time zone: UTC+01:00 (CET)
  - Summer (DST): UTC+02:00 (CEST)
- INSEE/Postal code: 80344 /80690
- ^{1} French Land Register data, which excludes lakes, ponds, glaciers > 1 km^{2} (0.386 sq mi or 247 acres) and river estuaries.

Francières (French pronunciation: [fʁɑ̃sjɛʁ]) is a commune in the Somme department in Hauts-de-France in northern France.

== Geography ==
The commune is situated on the D183e road, some 7 miles (11 km) southeast of Abbeville.

== Population ==
Historical population
| Year | Pop. | ±% p.a. |
|---|---|---|
| 1968 | 129 | — |
| 1975 | 140 | +1.18% |
| 1982 | 142 | +0.20% |
| 1990 | 129 | −1.19% |
| 1999 | 127 | −0.17% |
| 2007 | 177 | +4.24% |
| 2012 | 200 | +2.47% |
| 2017 | 194 | −0.61% |
| 2023 | 176 | −1.61% |
Source: INSEE

== See also ==
- Communes of the Somme department
