= Villers-sur-Authie =

- Commune
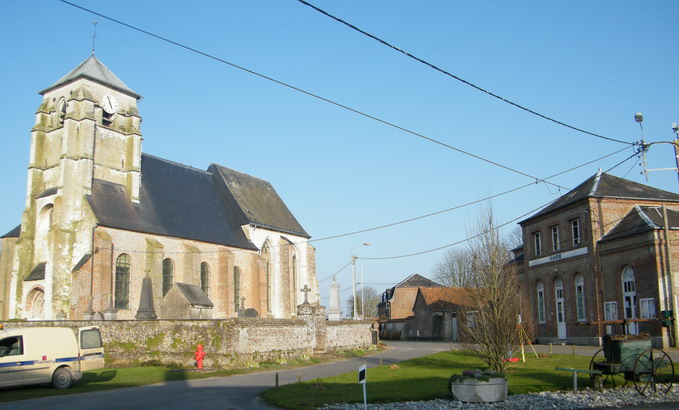
- The church and town hall in Villers-sur-Authie

- Coat of arms
- Location of Villers-sur-Authie
- Location within France Location within Hauts-de-France
- Coordinates: 50°19′03″N 1°41′39″E
- Country: France
- Region: Hauts-de-France
- Department: Somme
- Arrondissement: Abbeville
- Canton: Rue
- Intercommunality: CC Ponthieu-Marquenterre

Government
  - Mayor (2020–2026): Michel Riquet
- Area^{1}: 12.01 km^{2} (4.64 sq mi)
- Elevation: 5 m (16 ft)
- Highest elevation: 33 m (108 ft)
- Lowest elevation: 2 m (6.6 ft)
- Population (2023): 468
  - Density: 39.0/km^{2} (101/sq mi)
- Time zone: UTC+01:00 (CET)
  - Summer (DST): UTC+02:00 (CEST)
- INSEE/Postal code: 80806 /80120
- ^{1} French Land Register data, which excludes lakes, ponds, glaciers > 1 km^{2} (0.386 sq mi or 247 acres) and river estuaries.

Villers-sur-Authie is a commune in the Somme department in Hauts-de-France in northern France.

== Geography ==
The commune is situated 28 km (17 miles) north of Abbeville, on the D85 road.

== Population ==
Historical population
| Year | Pop. | ±% p.a. |
|---|---|---|
| 1968 | 420 | — |
| 1975 | 365 | −1.99% |
| 1982 | 379 | +0.54% |
| 1990 | 354 | −0.85% |
| 1999 | 362 | +0.25% |
| 2007 | 375 | +0.44% |
| 2012 | 433 | +2.92% |
| 2017 | 474 | +1.83% |
| 2023 | 468 | −0.21% |
Source: INSEE

== Gallery ==
Our Lady Church

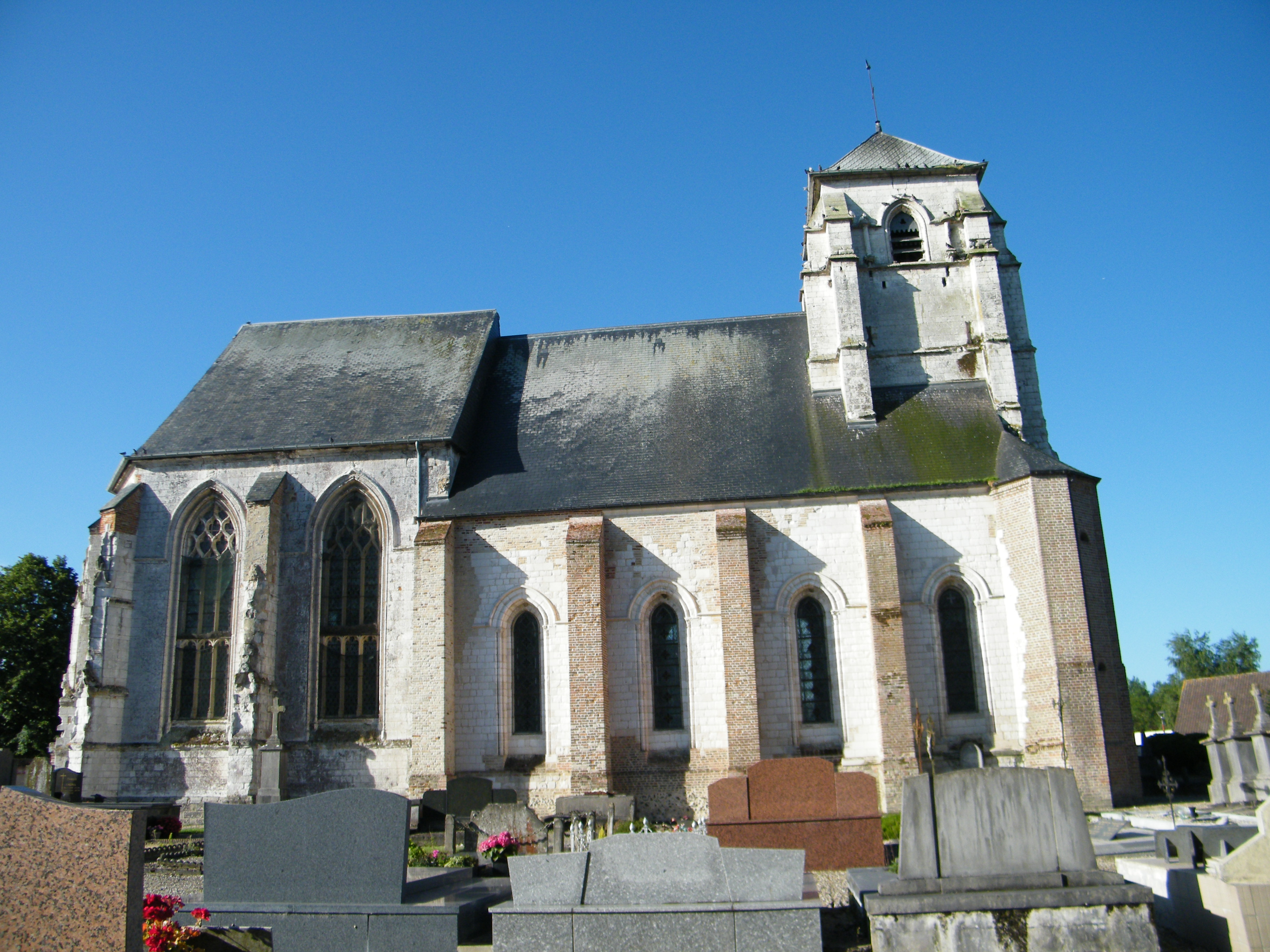

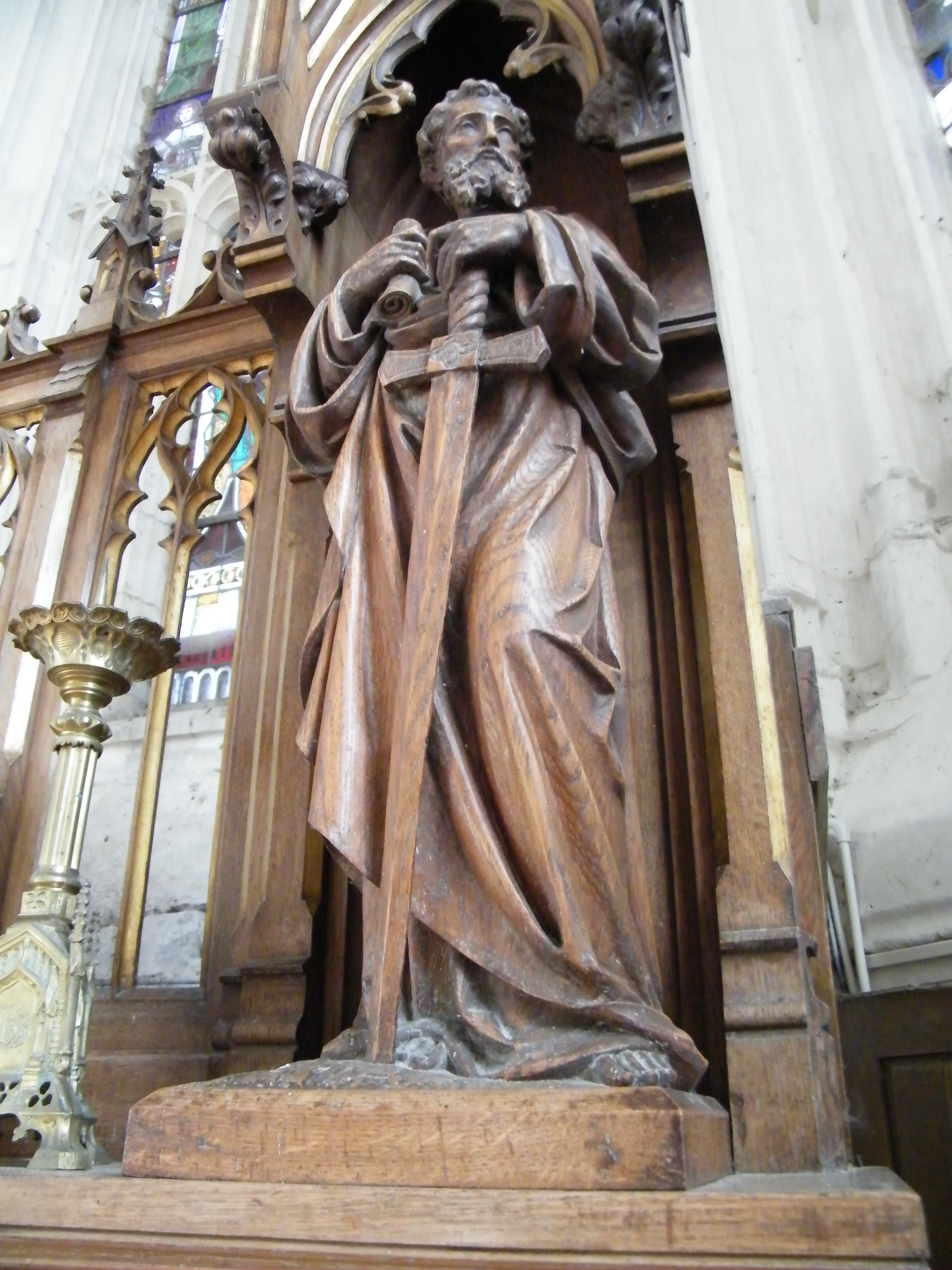

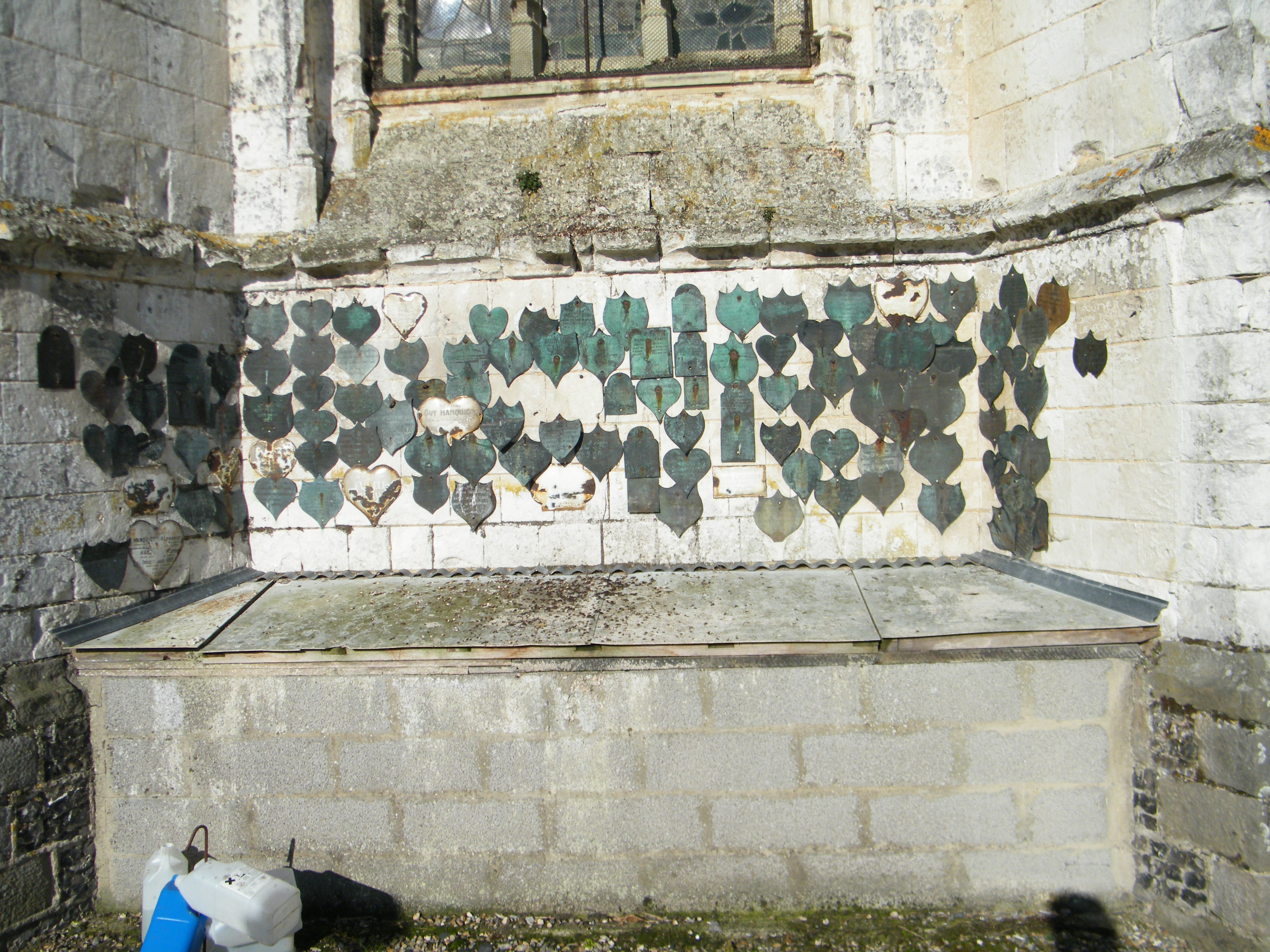

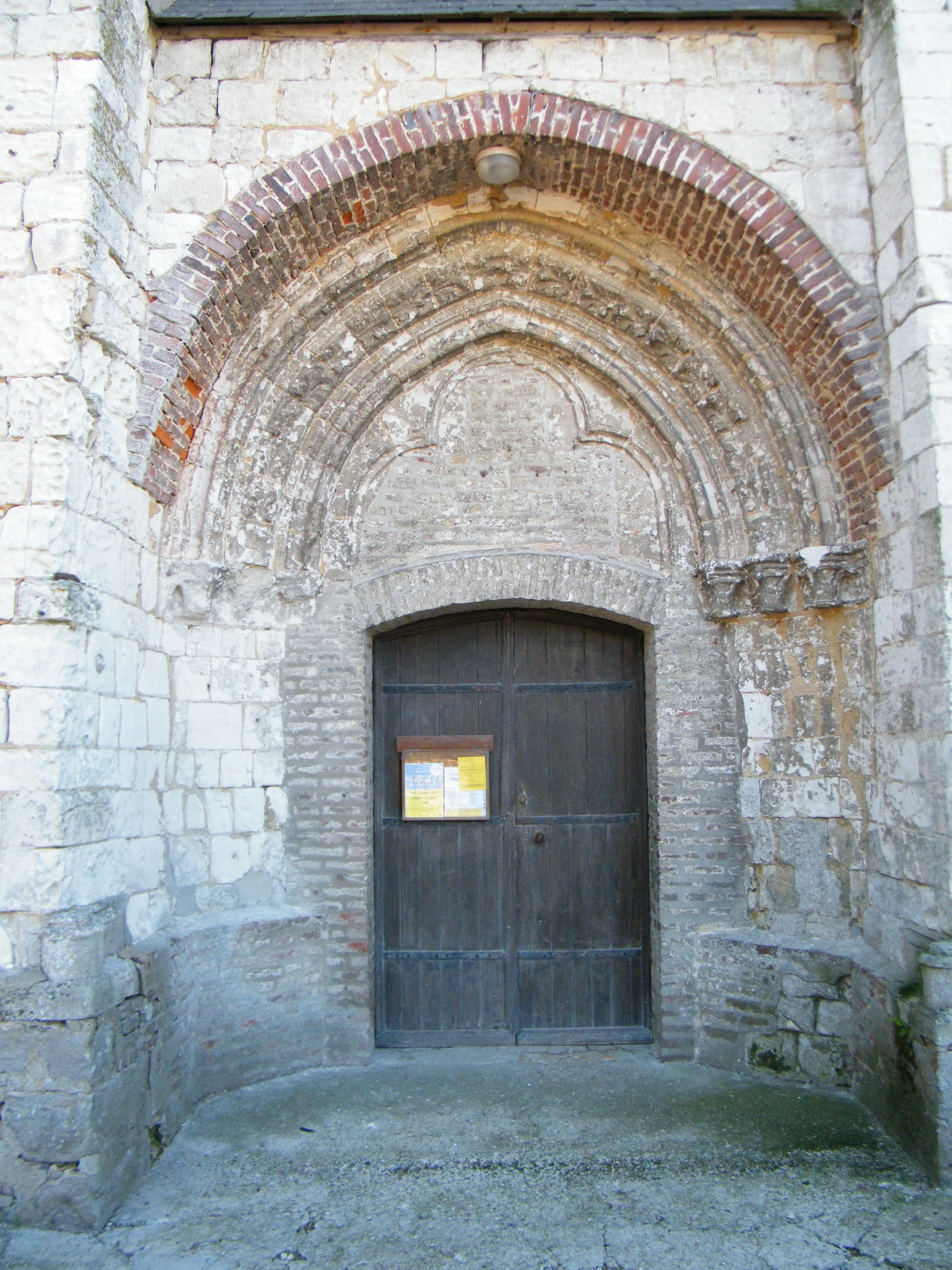

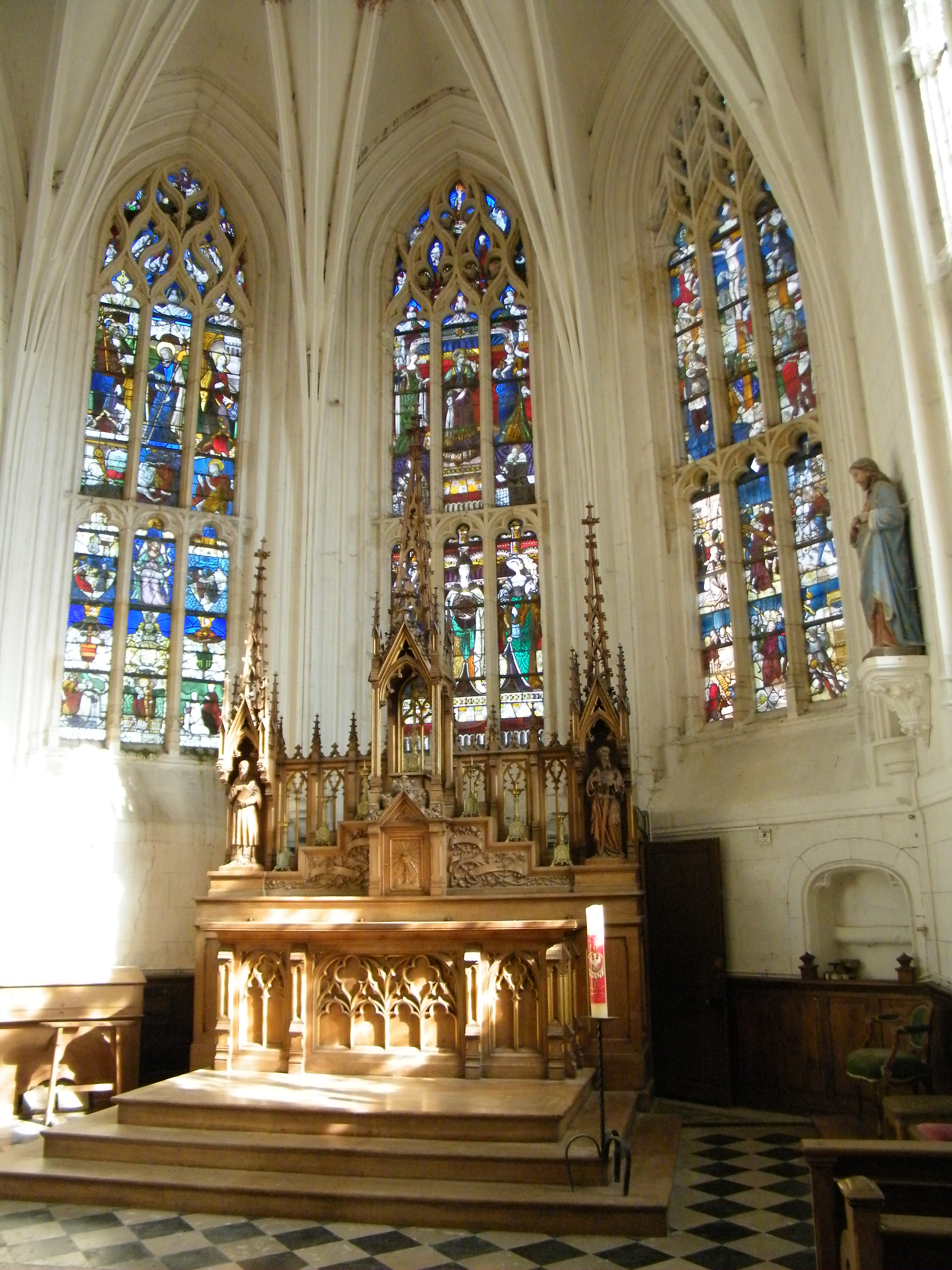

== See also ==
- Communes of the Somme department
