= Canton of Rue =

Coordinates: 50°16′23″N 1°40′7″E

Rue
- Canton
- Interactive map of Rue
- Country: France
- Region: Hauts-de-France
- Department: Somme
- No. of communes: {{{nbcomm}}}
- Area: 620.75 km^{2} (239.67 sq mi)
- Population (2023): 24,743
  - Density: 39.860/km^{2} (103.24/sq mi)
- INSEE code: 80 23

The Canton of Rue is a canton situated in the department of the Somme and in the Hauts-de-France region of northern France.

== Geography ==
The canton is organised around the commune of Rue in the arrondissement of Abbeville.

== Composition ==
At the French canton reorganisation which came into effect in March 2015, the canton was expanded from 17 to 55 communes (2 of which were merged into the new commune Bussus-lès-Yaucourt):

- Ailly-le-Haut-Clocher
- Argoules
- Arry
- Bernay-en-Ponthieu
- Le Boisle
- Boufflers
- Brailly-Cornehotte
- Brucamps
- Buigny-l'Abbé
- Bussus-lès-Yaucourt
- Cocquerel
- Coulonvillers
- Cramont
- Crécy-en-Ponthieu
- Le Crotoy
- Dominois
- Dompierre-sur-Authie
- Domqueur
- Ergnies
- Estrées-lès-Crécy
- Favières
- Fontaine-sur-Maye
- Fort-Mahon-Plage
- Francières
- Froyelles
- Gorenflos
- Gueschart
- Ligescourt
- Long
- Machiel
- Machy
- Maison-Ponthieu
- Maison-Roland
- Mesnil-Domqueur
- Mouflers
- Nampont
- Neuilly-le-Dien
- Noyelles-en-Chaussée
- Oneux
- Ponches-Estruval
- Pont-Remy
- Quend
- Regnière-Écluse
- Rue
- Saint-Quentin-en-Tourmont
- Saint-Riquier
- Vercourt
- Villers-sous-Ailly
- Villers-sur-Authie
- Vironchaux
- Vitz-sur-Authie
- Vron
- Yvrench
- Yvrencheux

== Population ==
Historical population
Year	Pop.	±% p.a.
2013	25,098	—
2018	24,900	−0.16%
Source: INSEE

== See also ==
- Arrondissements of the Somme department
- Cantons of the Somme department
- Communes of the Somme department
