= Ponches-Estruval =

- Commune
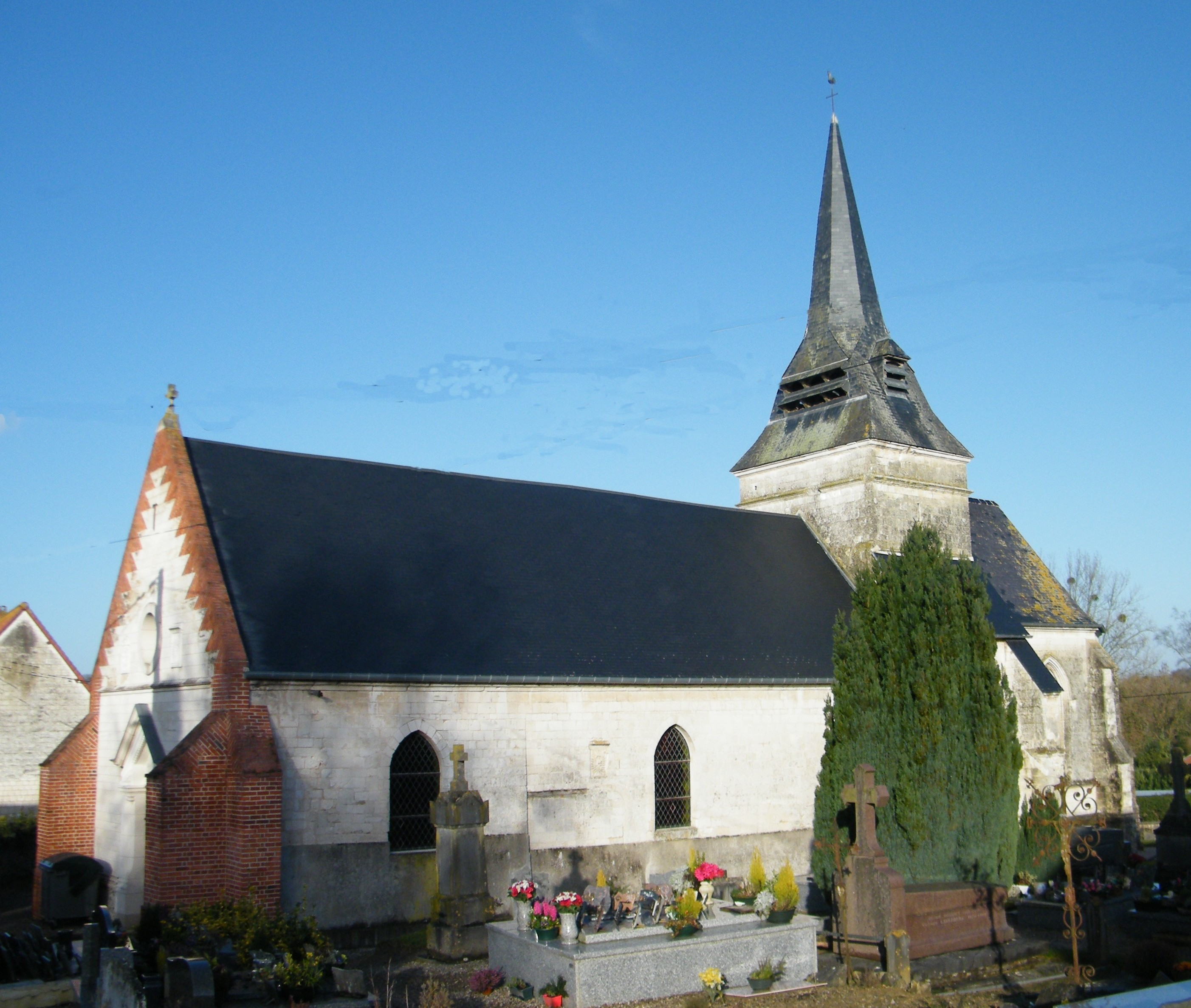
- The church in Ponches-Estruval

- Coat of arms
- Location of Ponches-Estruval
- Location within France Location within Hauts-de-France
- Coordinates: 50°18′37″N 1°53′46″E
- Country: France
- Region: Hauts-de-France
- Department: Somme
- Arrondissement: Abbeville
- Canton: Rue
- Intercommunality: CC Ponthieu-Marquenterre

Government
  - Mayor (2020–2026): Alain Pouilly
- Area^{1}: 7.04 km^{2} (2.72 sq mi)
- Elevation: 16 m (52 ft)
- Highest elevation: 69 m (226 ft)
- Lowest elevation: 10 m (33 ft)
- Population (2023): 127
  - Density: 18.0/km^{2} (46.7/sq mi)
- Time zone: UTC+01:00 (CET)
  - Summer (DST): UTC+02:00 (CEST)
- INSEE/Postal code: 80631 /80150
- ^{1} French Land Register data, which excludes lakes, ponds, glaciers > 1 km^{2} (0.386 sq mi or 247 acres) and river estuaries.

Ponches-Estruval is a commune in the Somme department in Hauts-de-France in northern France.

== Geography ==
The commune is situated on the D224 road, some 16 miles (26 km) north of Abbeville, by the banks of the river Authie and on the border with the Pas-de-Calais.

== Population ==
Historical population
Year	Pop.	±% p.a.
1968	167	—
1975	146	−1.90%
1982	154	+0.76%
1990	123	−2.77%
1999	125	+0.18%
2007	108	−1.81%
2012	113	+0.91%
2017	101	−2.22%
2023	127	+3.89%
Source: INSEE

== See also ==
- Communes of the Somme department
