= Vercourt =

- Commune
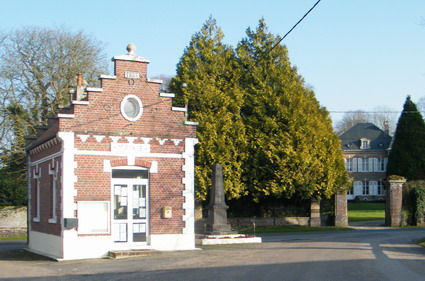
- The main square in Vercourt, with the town hall, chateau and war memorial

- Coat of arms
- Location of Vercourt
- Location within France Location within Hauts-de-France
- Coordinates: 50°18′03″N 1°42′07″E
- Country: France
- Region: Hauts-de-France
- Department: Somme
- Arrondissement: Abbeville
- Canton: Rue
- Intercommunality: CC Ponthieu-Marquenterre

Government
  - Mayor (2020–2026): Vincent Dubois
- Area^{1}: 4.67 km^{2} (1.80 sq mi)
- Elevation: 4 m (13 ft)
- Highest elevation: 31 m (102 ft)
- Lowest elevation: 3 m (9.8 ft)
- Population (2023): 97
  - Density: 21/km^{2} (54/sq mi)
- Time zone: UTC+01:00 (CET)
  - Summer (DST): UTC+02:00 (CEST)
- INSEE/Postal code: 80787 /80120
- ^{1} French Land Register data, which excludes lakes, ponds, glaciers > 1 km^{2} (0.386 sq mi or 247 acres) and river estuaries.

Vercourt is a commune in the Somme department in Hauts-de-France in northern France.

== Geography ==
Vercourt is situated 15 miles (24 km) north of Abbeville, on the D175 road

== Population ==
Historical population
Year	Pop.	±% p.a.
1968	119	—
1975	108	−1.38%
1982	90	−2.57%
1990	82	−1.16%
1999	85	+0.40%
2007	109	+3.16%
2012	103	−1.13%
2017	93	−2.02%
2023	97	+0.70%
Source: INSEE

== Gallery ==
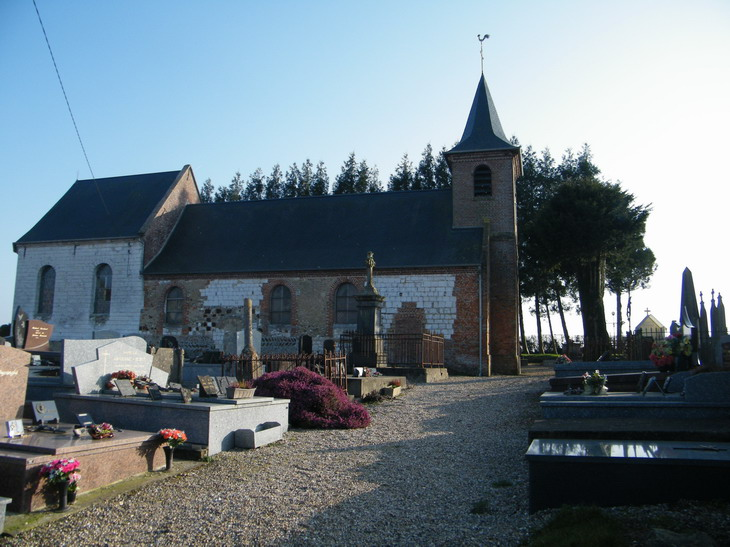
Church Saint-Saturnin.

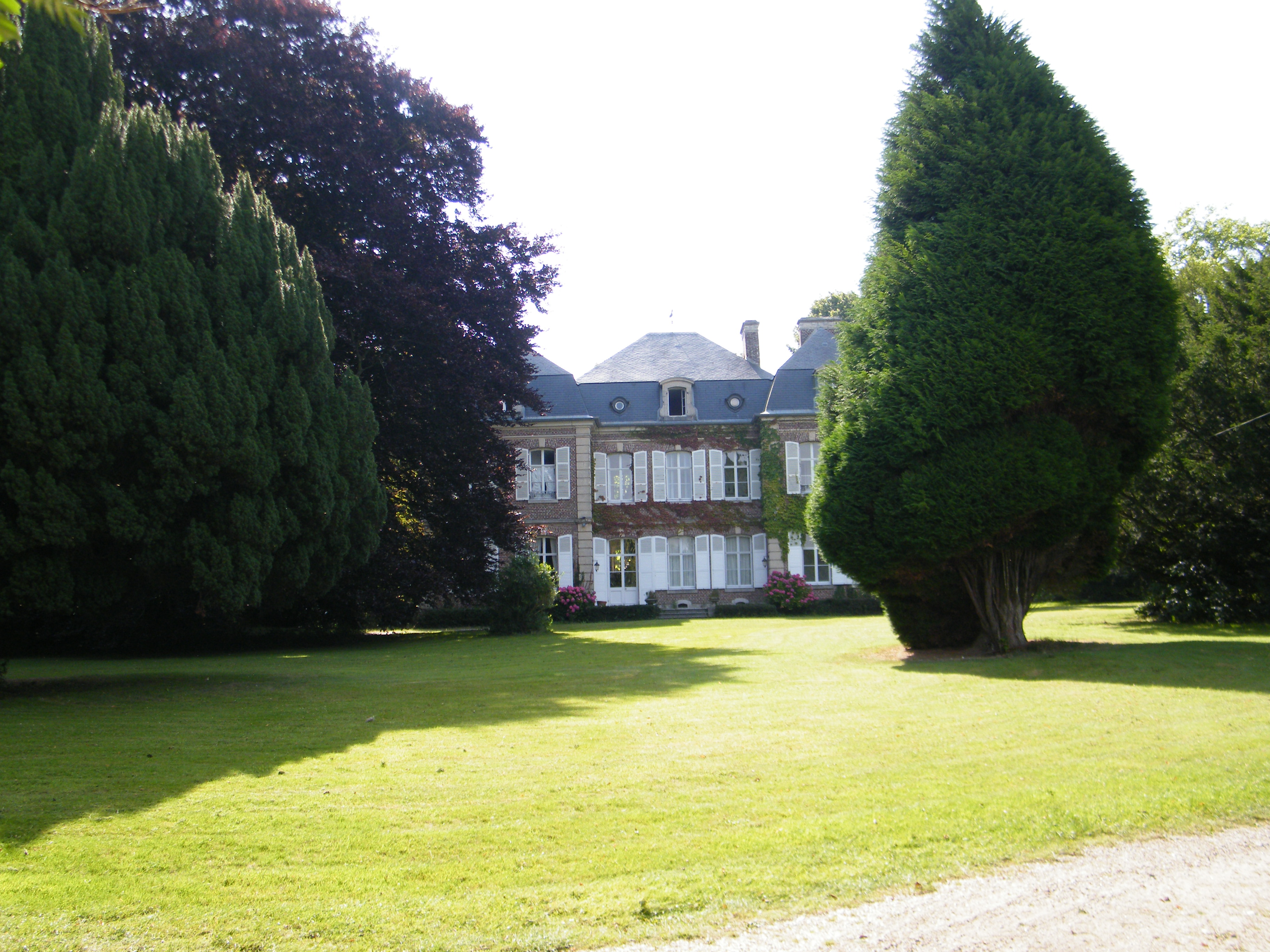
Castle.

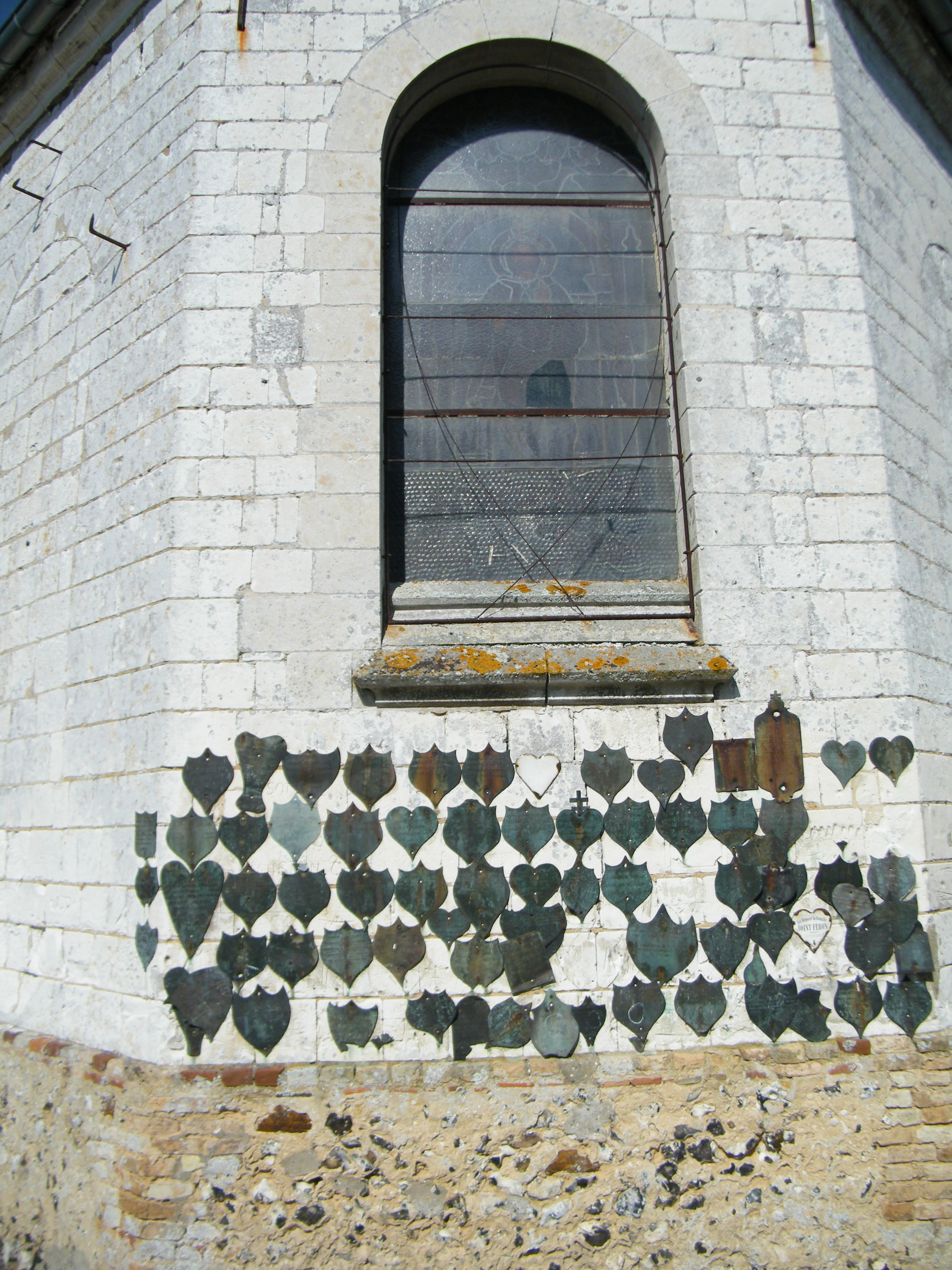
Church.

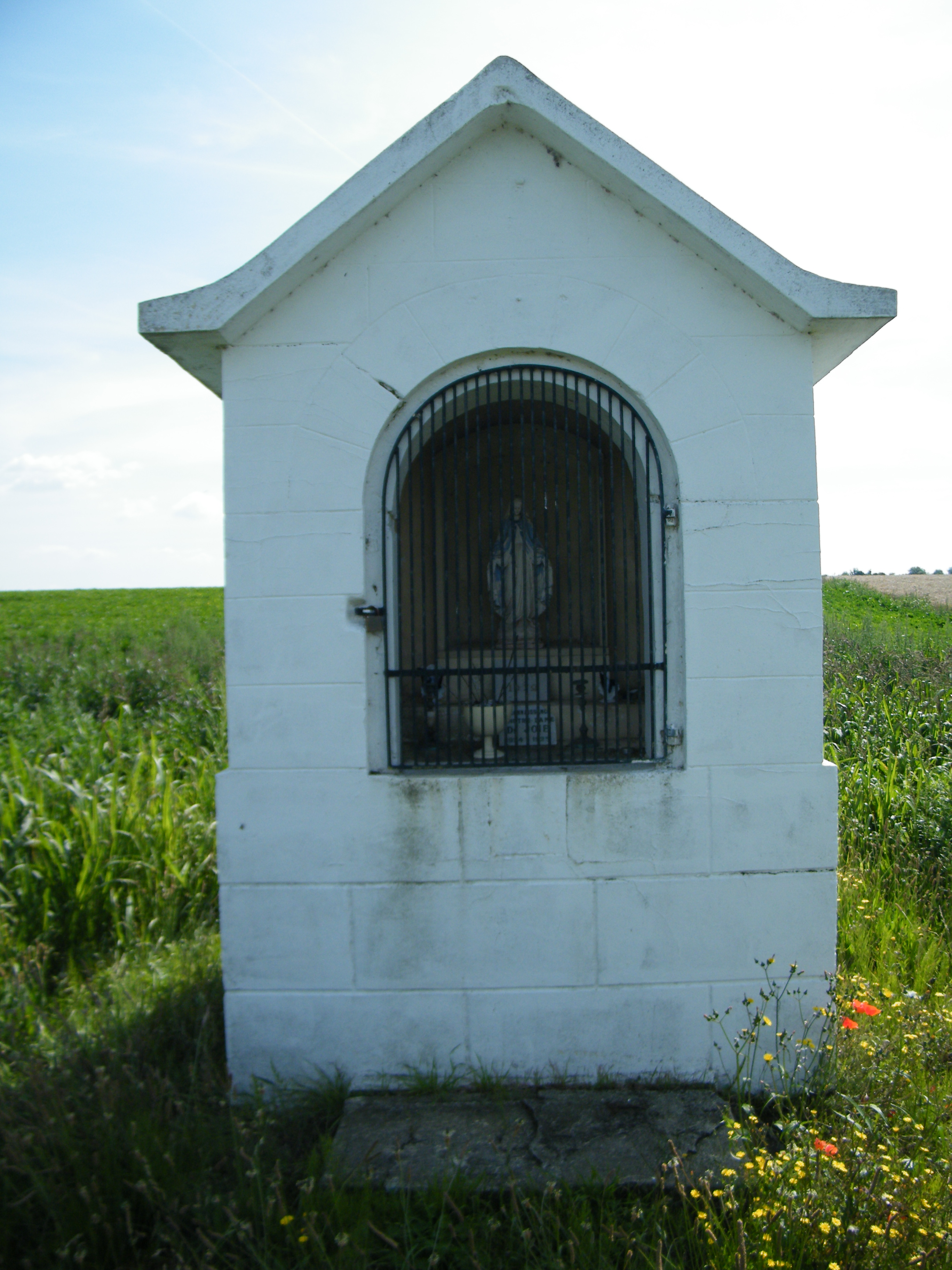
Notre-Dame de joie, towards Cantereine.

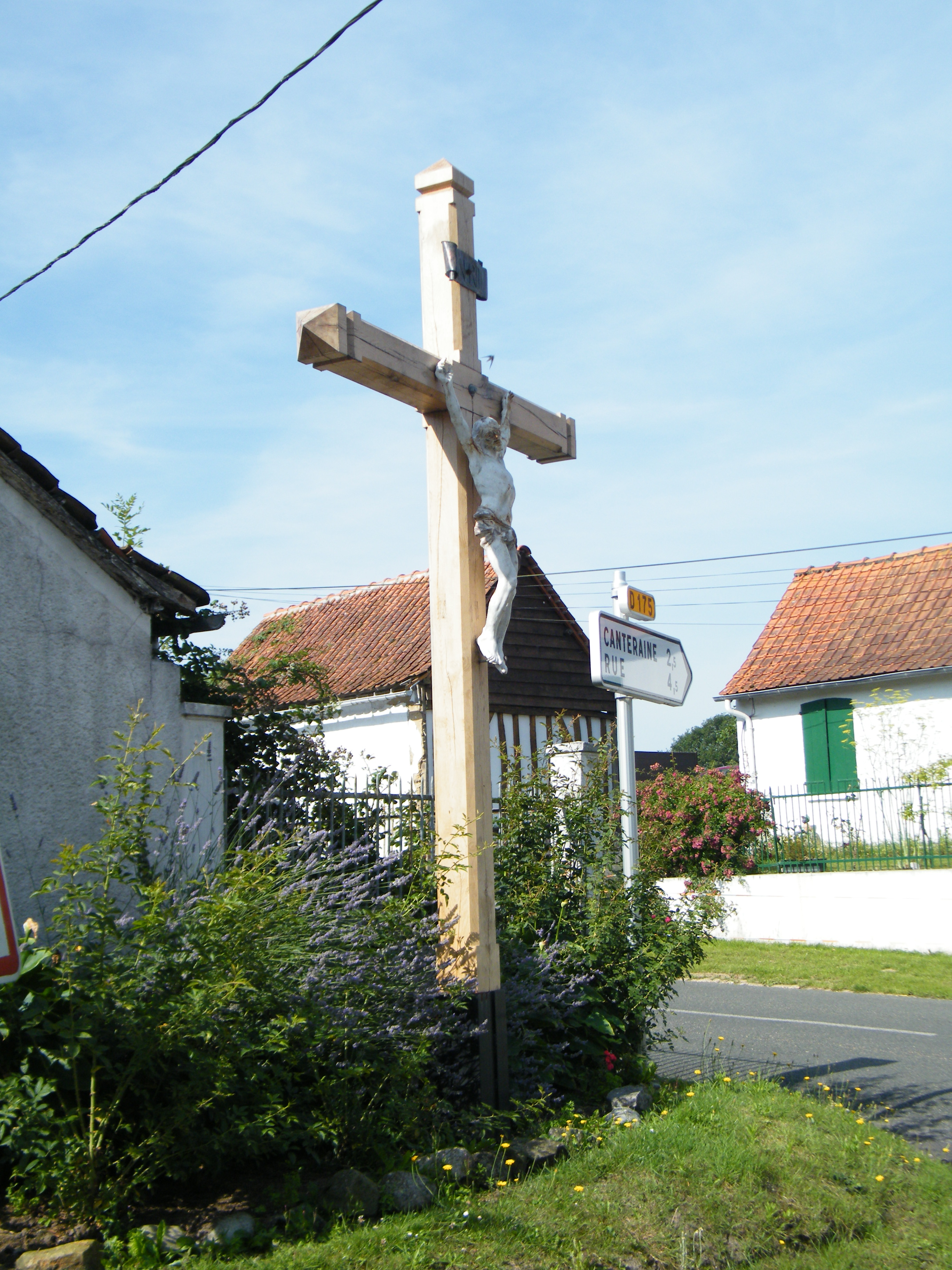

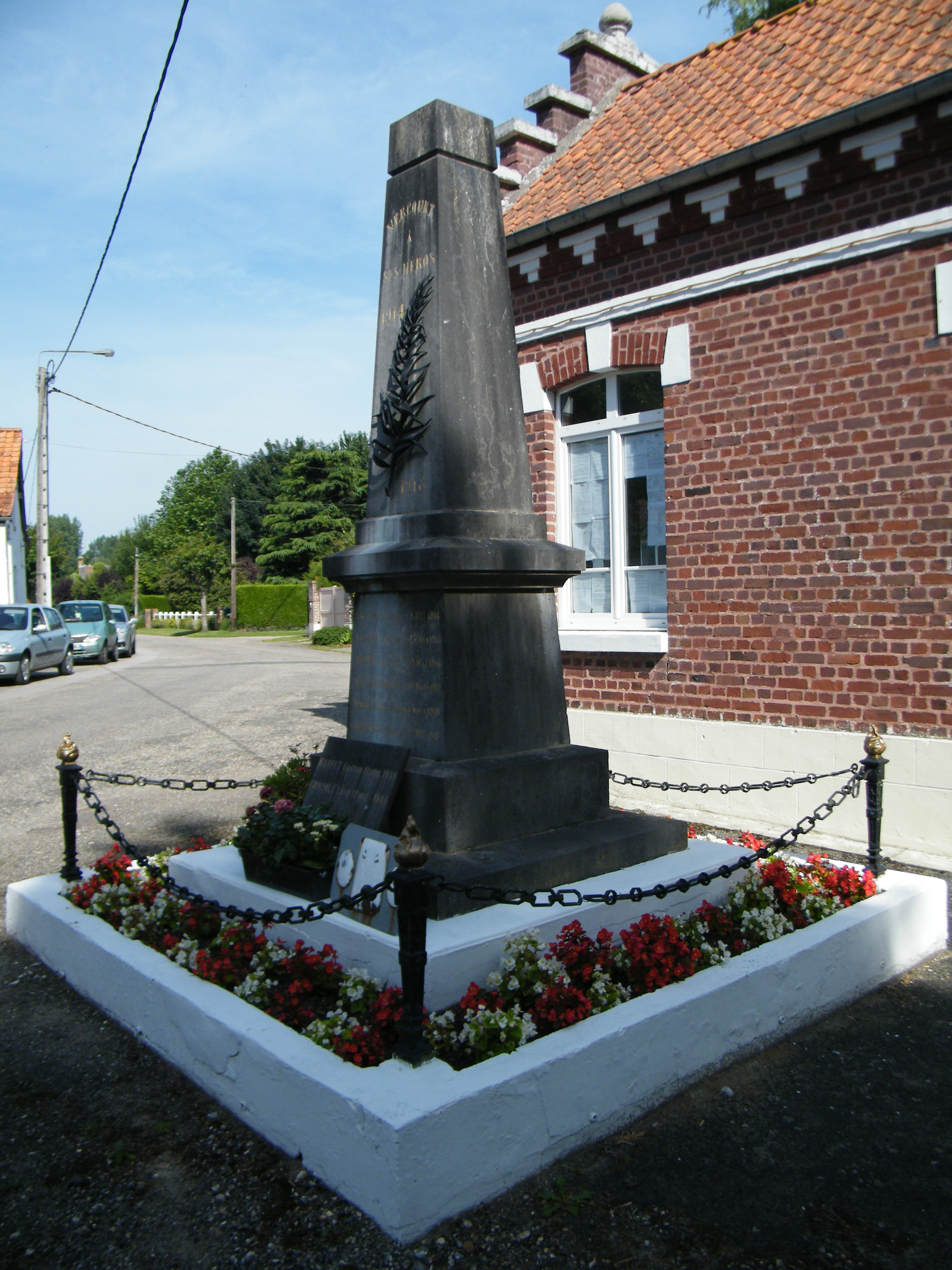
Monument aux morts.

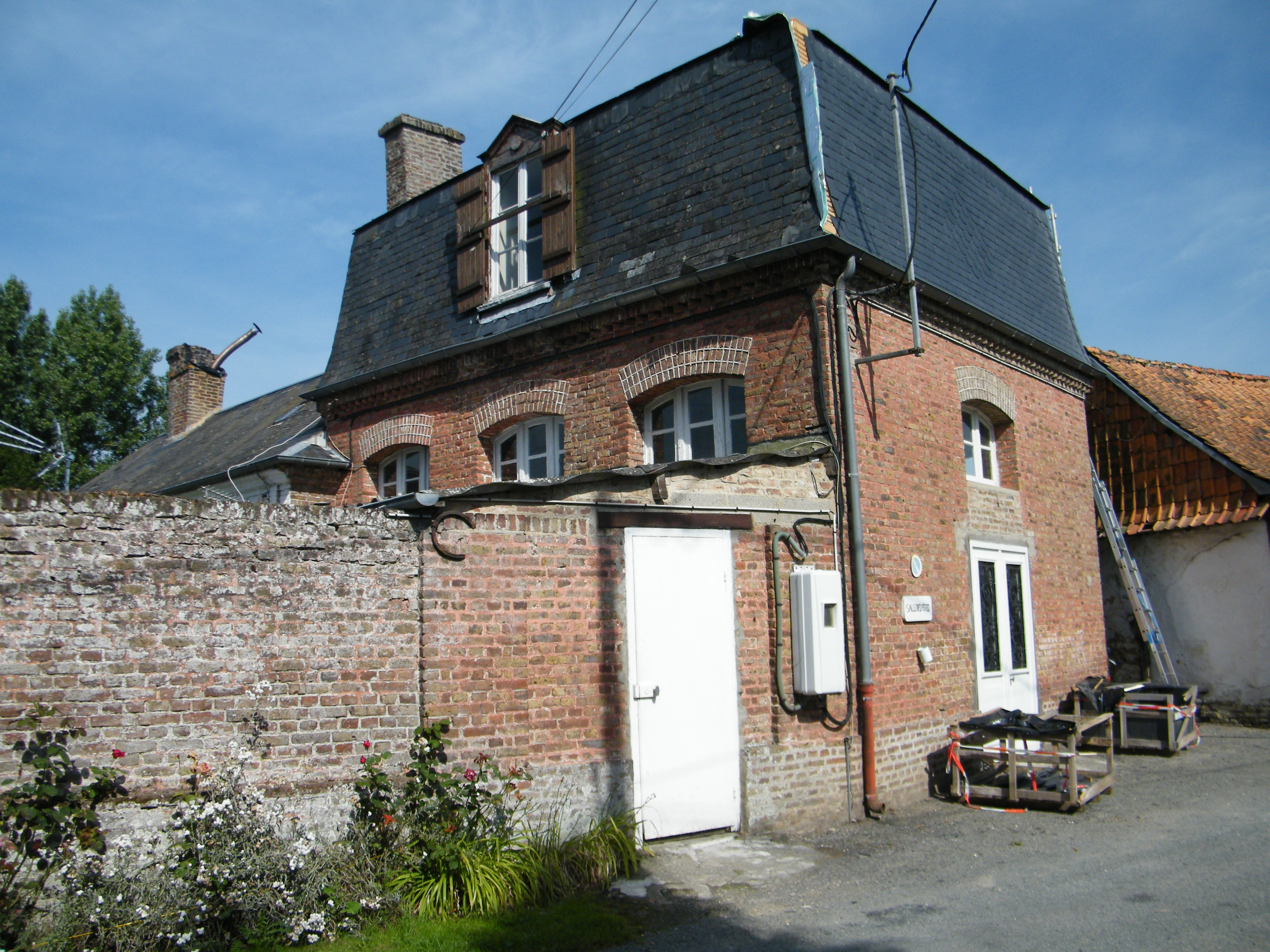
Old school.

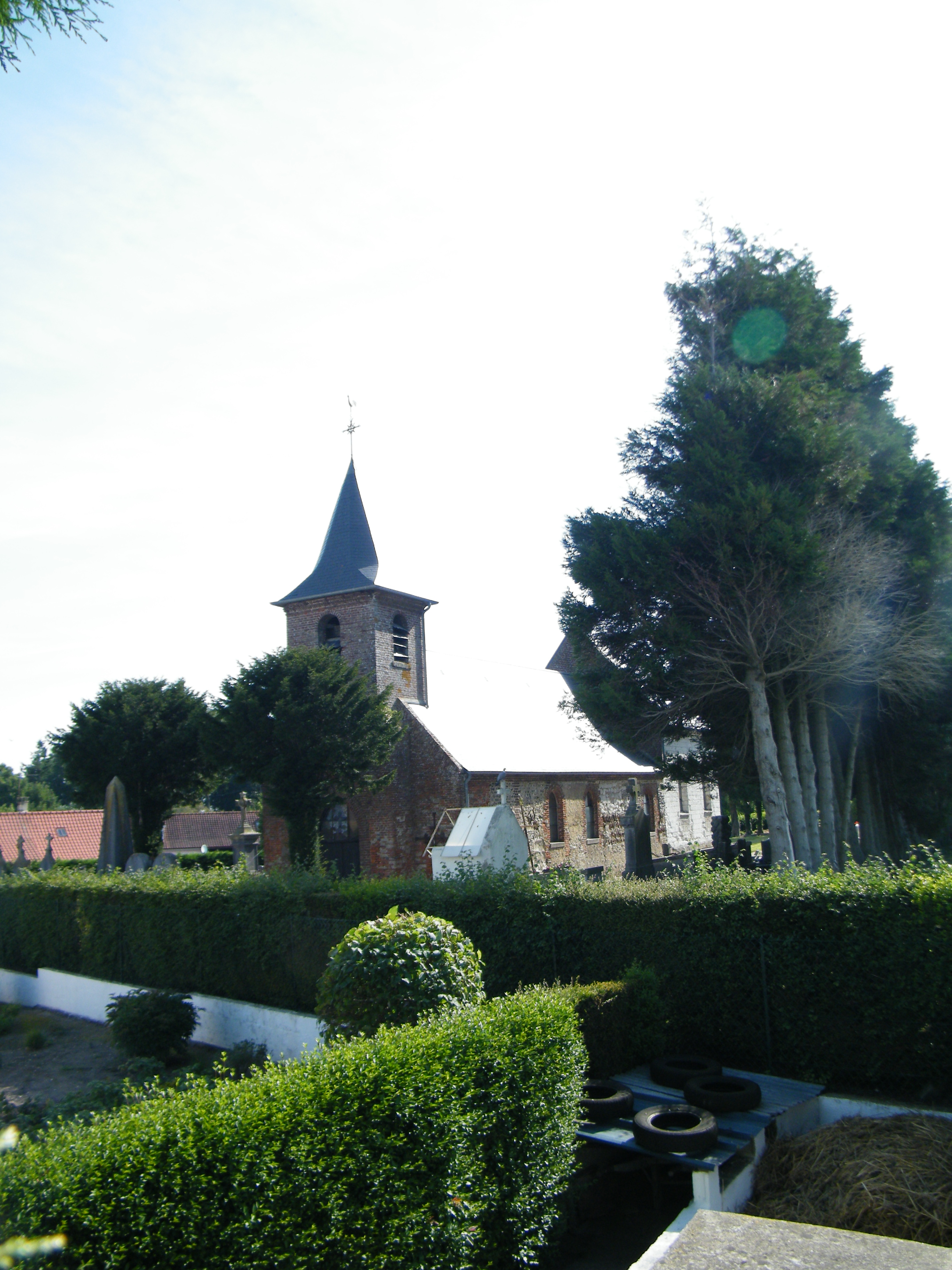
Church.

== See also ==
- Communes of the Somme department
