= Buigny-l'Abbé =

- Commune
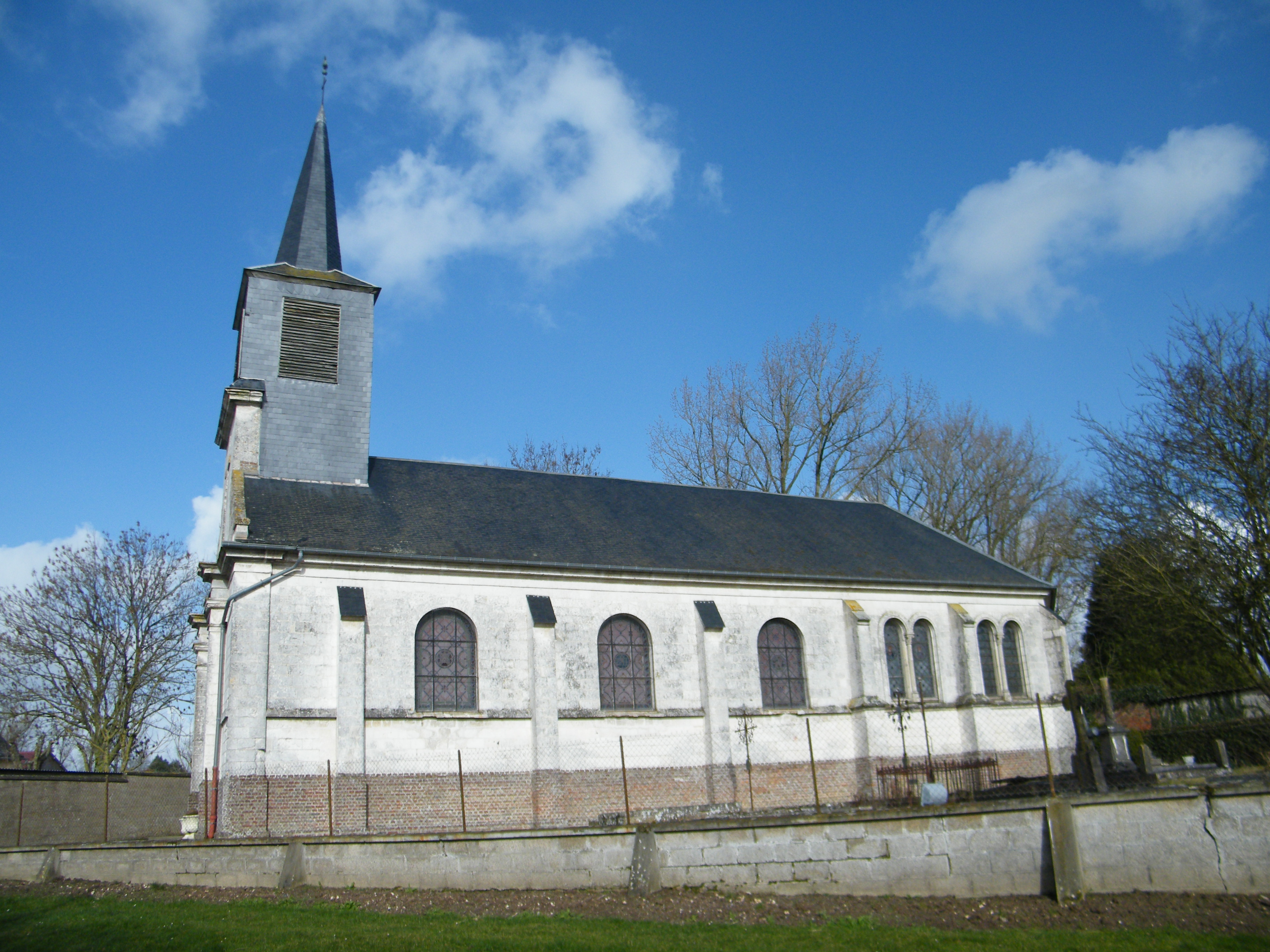
- The church in Buigny

- Coat of arms
- Location of Buigny-l'Abbé
- Location within France Location within Hauts-de-France
- Coordinates: 50°05′57″N 1°56′17″E
- Country: France
- Region: Hauts-de-France
- Department: Somme
- Arrondissement: Abbeville
- Canton: Rue
- Intercommunality: CC Ponthieu-Marquenterre

Government
  - Mayor (2020–2026): René Cat
- Area^{1}: 7.22 km^{2} (2.79 sq mi)
- Elevation: 50 m (160 ft)
- Highest elevation: 108 m (354 ft)
- Lowest elevation: 59 m (194 ft)
- Population (2023): 341
  - Density: 47.2/km^{2} (122/sq mi)
- Time zone: UTC+01:00 (CET)
  - Summer (DST): UTC+02:00 (CEST)
- INSEE/Postal code: 80147 /80132
- ^{1} French Land Register data, which excludes lakes, ponds, glaciers > 1 km^{2} (0.386 sq mi or 247 acres) and river estuaries.

Buigny-l'Abbé (French pronunciation: [bɥiɲi labe]; Picard: Boégny-l'Abé) is a commune in the Somme department in Hauts-de-France in northern France.

== Geography ==
The commune is situated on the D153 and D183 crossroads, some 8 kilometres (5 mi) east of Abbeville.

== Population ==
Historical population
Year	Pop.	±% p.a.
1968	316	—
1975	324	+0.36%
1982	308	−0.72%
1990	324	+0.64%
1999	333	+0.30%
2007	312	−0.81%
2012	341	+1.79%
2017	311	−1.82%
2023	341	+1.55%
Source: INSEE

== See also ==
- Communes of the Somme department
