= Oneux =

- Commune
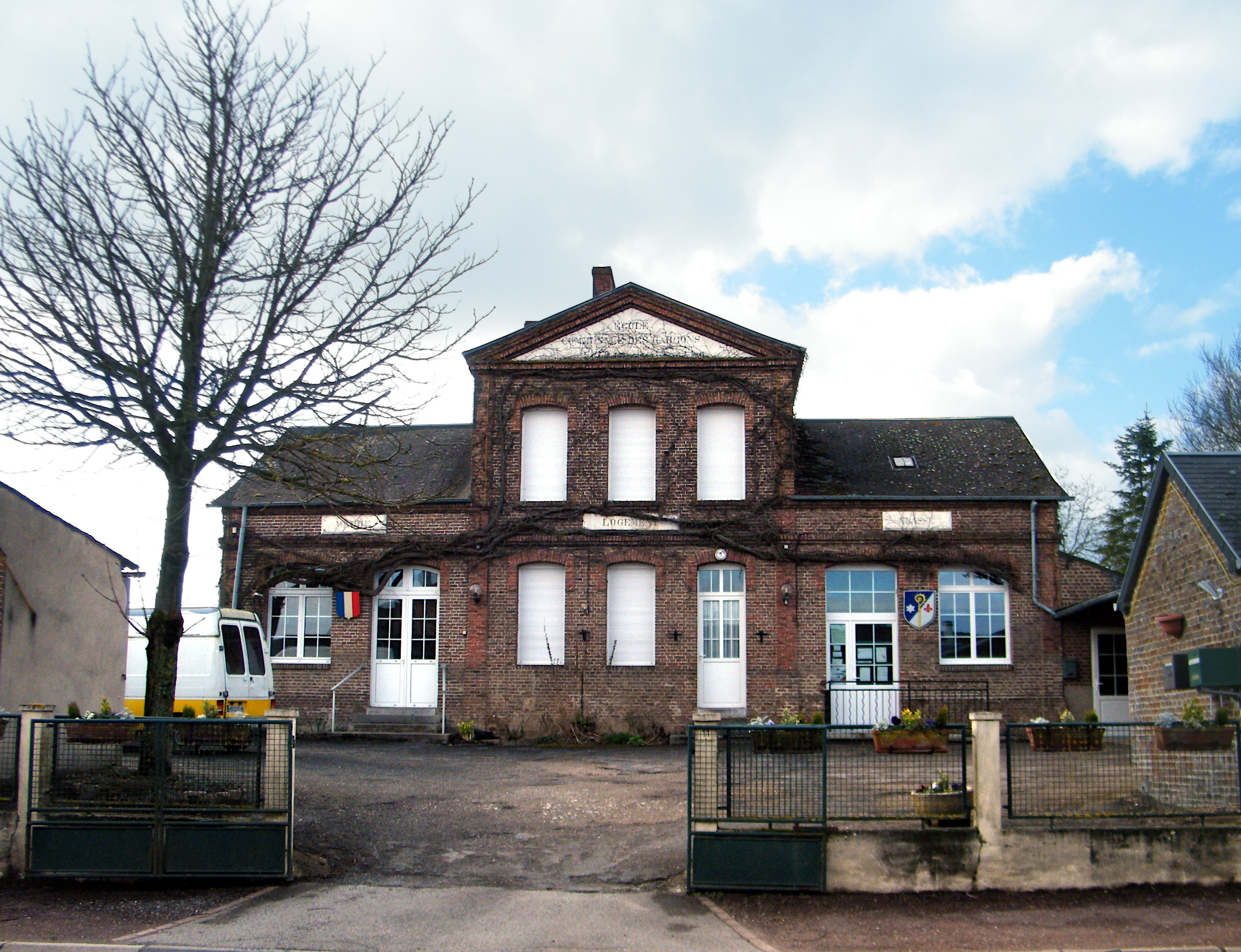
- The town hall and school in Oneux

- Coat of arms
- Location of Oneux
- Location within France Location within Hauts-de-France
- Coordinates: 50°08′45″N 1°58′19″E
- Country: France
- Region: Hauts-de-France
- Department: Somme
- Arrondissement: Abbeville
- Canton: Rue
- Intercommunality: CC Ponthieu-Marquenterre

Government
  - Mayor (2020–2026): Bernard Buteux
- Area^{1}: 12.49 km^{2} (4.82 sq mi)
- Elevation: 56 m (184 ft)
- Highest elevation: 117 m (384 ft)
- Lowest elevation: 32 m (105 ft)
- Population (2023): 434
  - Density: 34.7/km^{2} (90.0/sq mi)
- Time zone: UTC+01:00 (CET)
  - Summer (DST): UTC+02:00 (CEST)
- INSEE/Postal code: 80609 /80135
- ^{1} French Land Register data, which excludes lakes, ponds, glaciers > 1 km^{2} (0.386 sq mi or 247 acres) and river estuaries.

Oneux (French pronunciation: [ɔnø]) is a commune in the Somme department in Hauts-de-France in northern France.

== Geography ==
Oneux is situated on the D941 road, some 7 miles (11 km) northeast of Abbeville.

== Places of interest ==
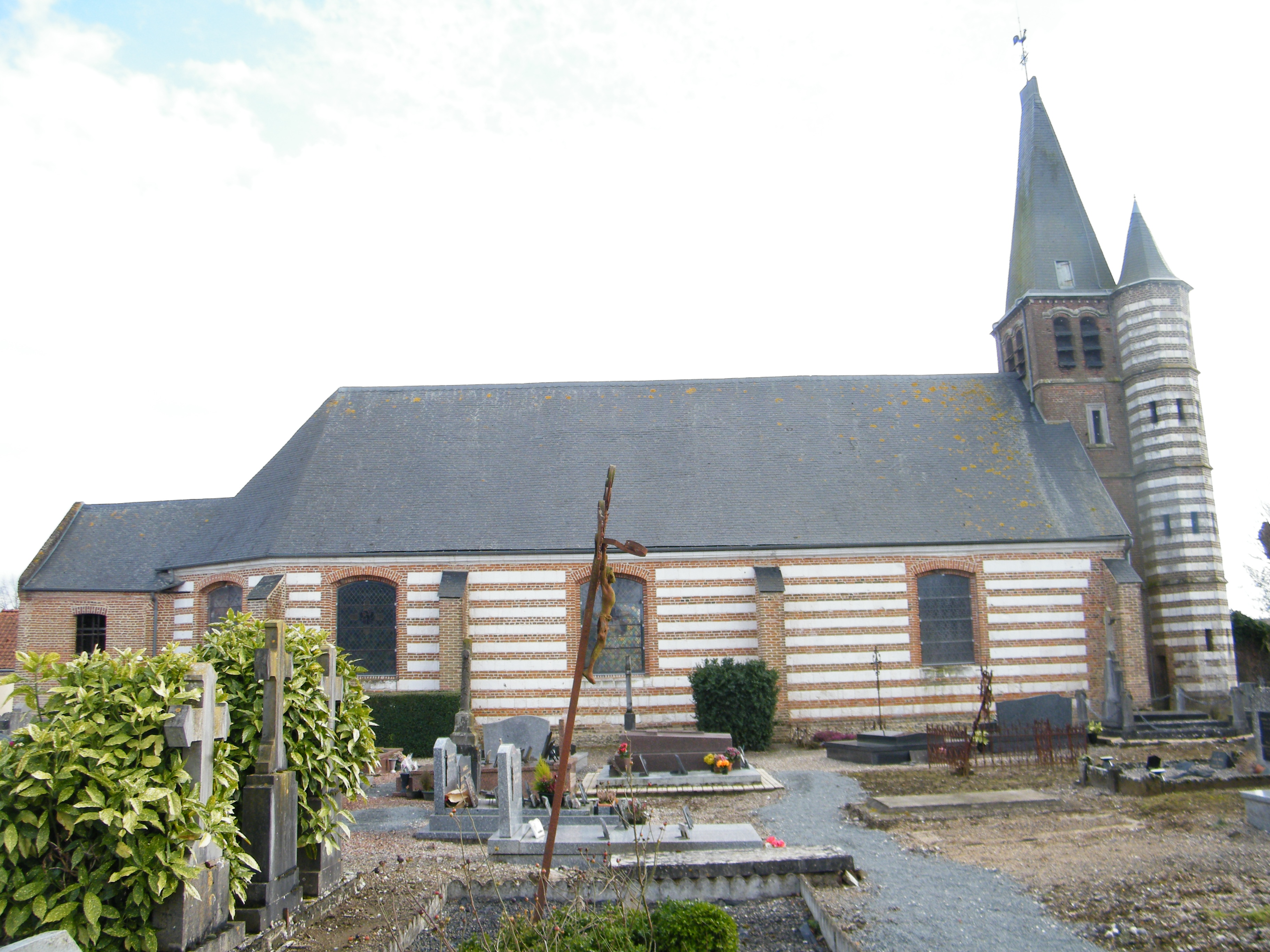
Saint Martin's Church in Oneux

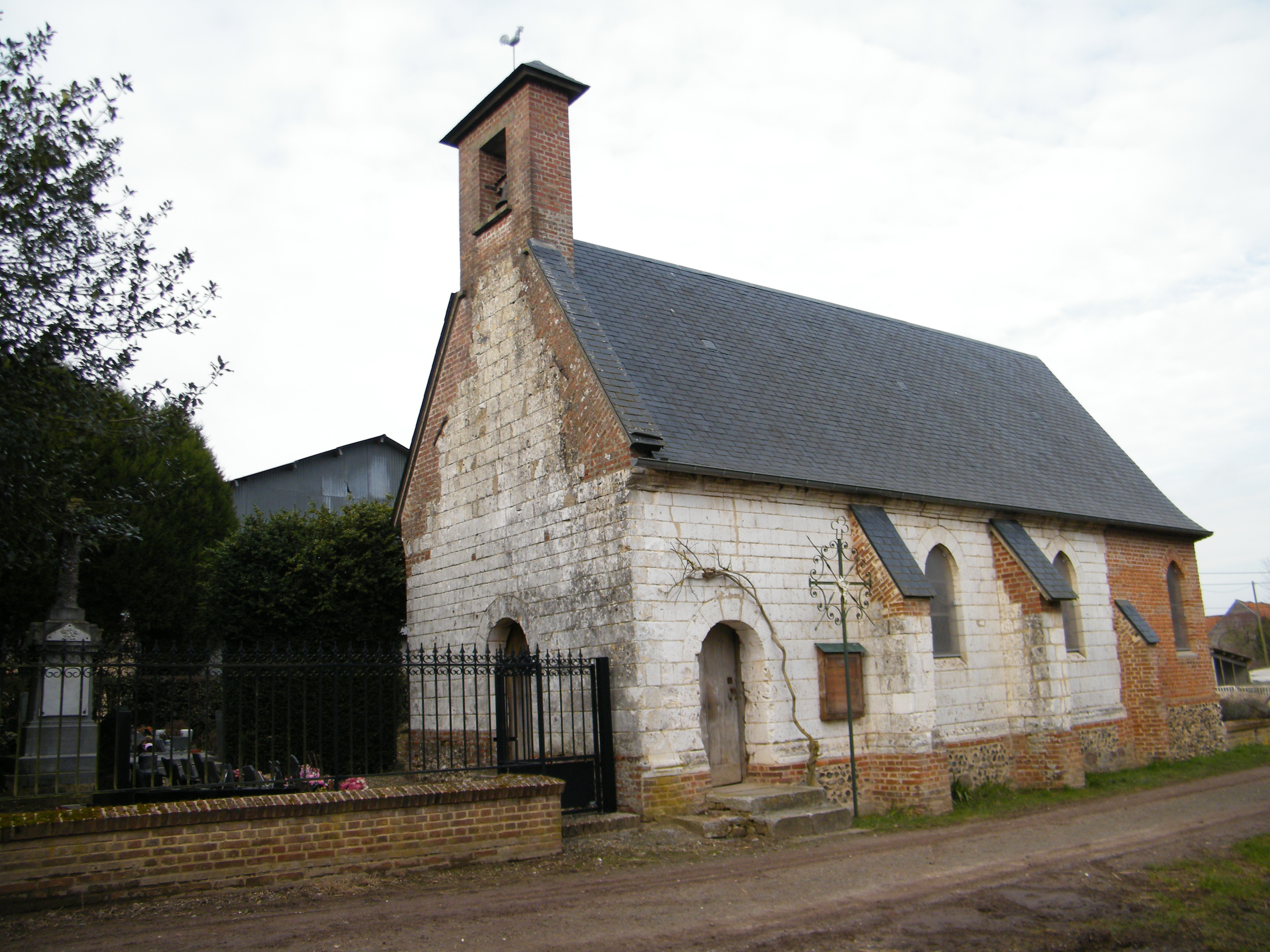
Chapel in Le Festel

== Population ==
Historical population
Year	Pop.	±% p.a.
1968	329	—
1975	332	+0.13%
1982	347	+0.63%
1990	351	+0.14%
1999	310	−1.37%
2007	356	+1.74%
2012	379	+1.26%
2017	389	+0.52%
2023	434	+1.84%
Source: INSEE

== See also ==
- Communes of the Somme department
