= Coulonvillers =

- Commune
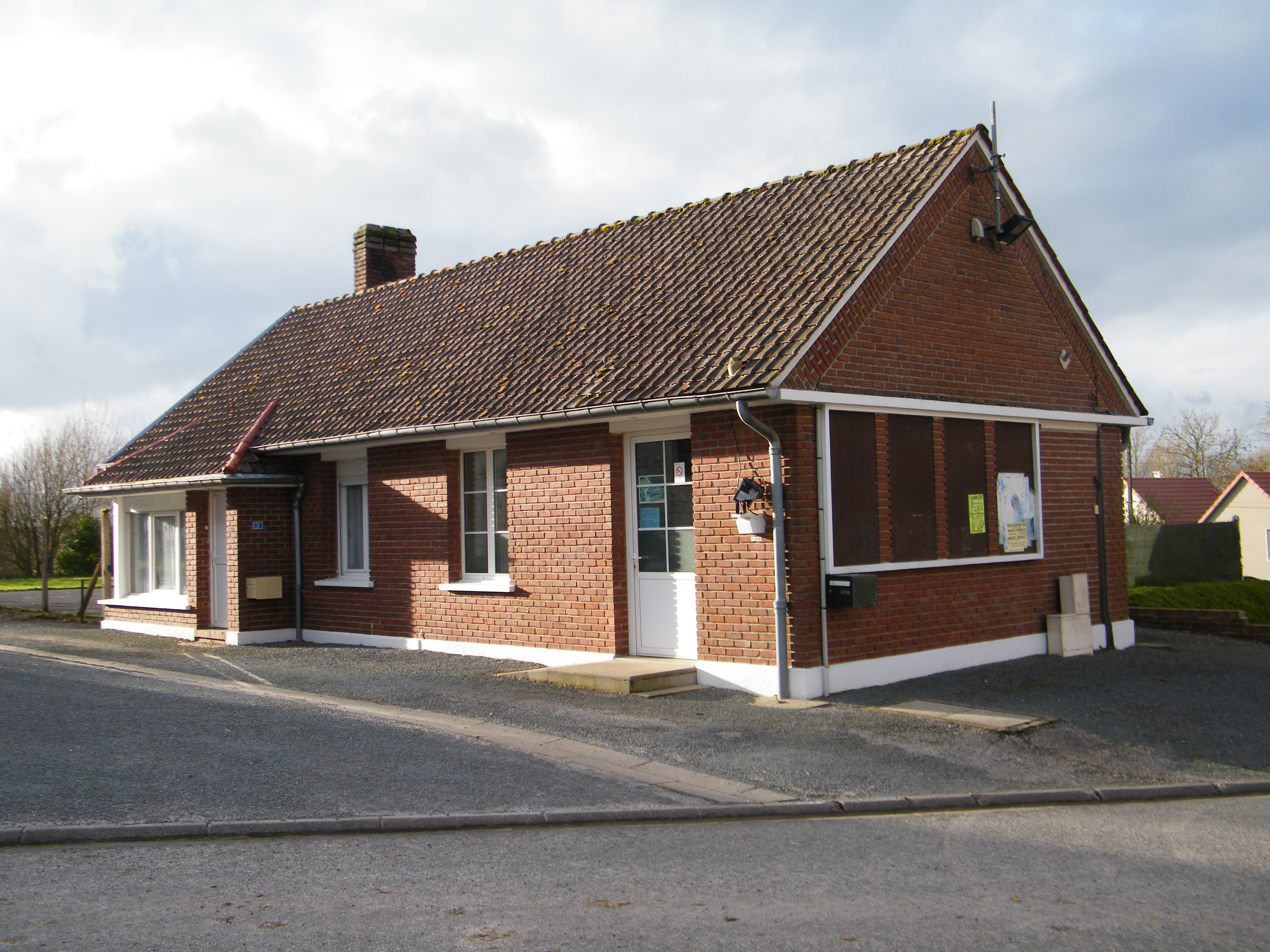
- The town hall in Coulonvillers

- Coat of arms
- Location of Coulonvillers
- Location within France Location within Hauts-de-France
- Coordinates: 50°08′35″N 2°00′28″E
- Country: France
- Region: Hauts-de-France
- Department: Somme
- Arrondissement: Abbeville
- Canton: Rue
- Intercommunality: CC Ponthieu-Marquenterre

Government
  - Mayor (2020–2026): James Hecquet
- Area^{1}: 9.47 km^{2} (3.66 sq mi)
- Elevation: 110 m (360 ft)
- Highest elevation: 132 m (433 ft)
- Lowest elevation: 60 m (200 ft)
- Population (2023): 214
  - Density: 22.6/km^{2} (58.5/sq mi)
- Time zone: UTC+01:00 (CET)
  - Summer (DST): UTC+02:00 (CEST)
- INSEE/Postal code: 80215 /80135
- ^{1} French Land Register data, which excludes lakes, ponds, glaciers > 1 km^{2} (0.386 sq mi or 247 acres) and river estuaries.

Coulonvillers is a commune in the Somme department in Hauts-de-France in northern France.

== Geography ==
Situated on the N925 road, some 8 miles (13 km) east of Abbeville.

== Population ==
Historical population
Year	Pop.	±% p.a.
1968	233	—
1975	202	−2.02%
1982	190	−0.87%
1990	176	−0.95%
1999	226	+2.82%
2007	240	+0.75%
2012	237	−0.25%
2017	231	−0.51%
2023	214	−1.27%
Source: INSEE

== See also ==
- Communes of the Somme department
