= Noyelles-en-Chaussée =

- Commune
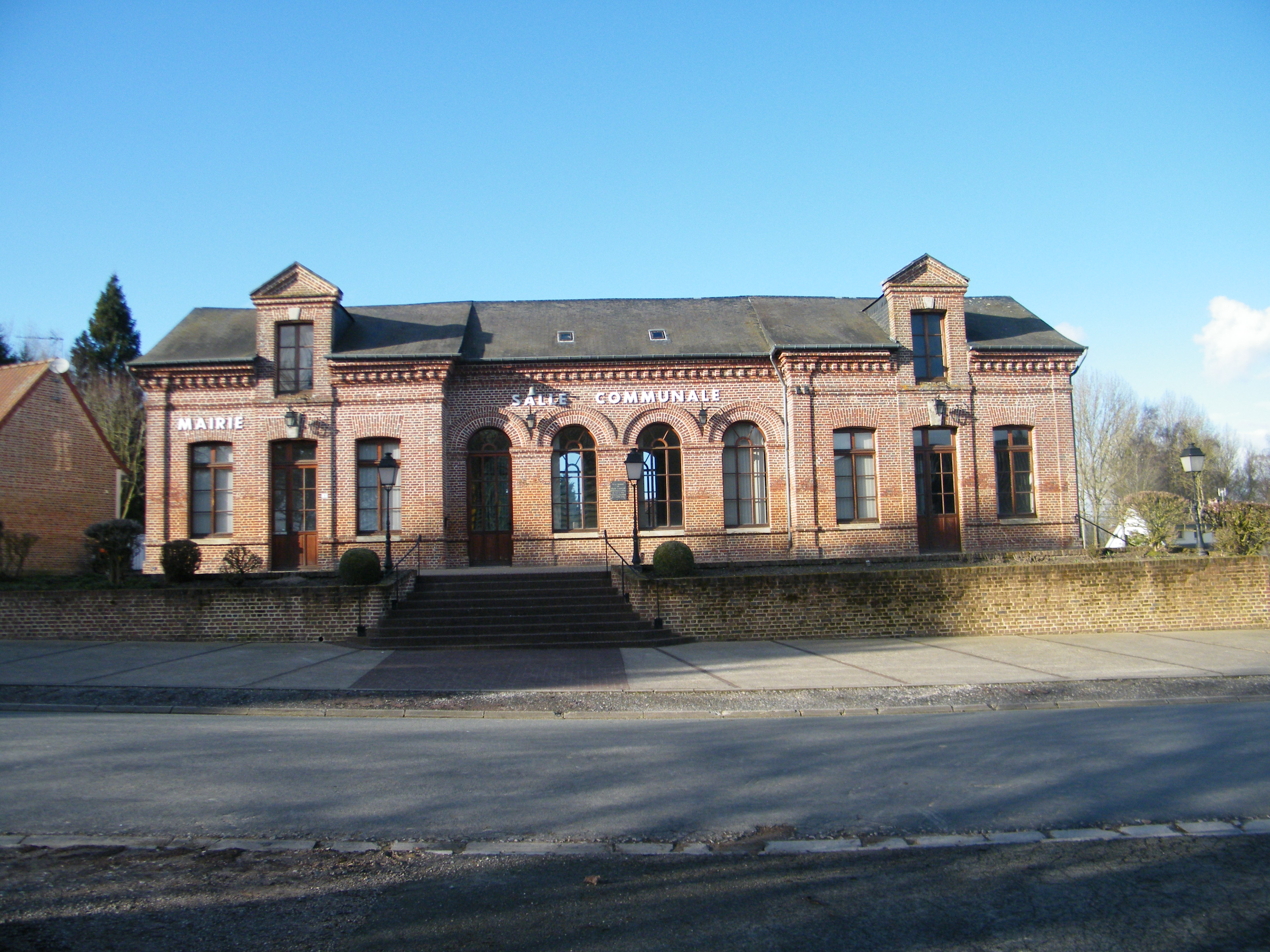
- The town hall in Noyelles

- Coat of arms
- Location of Noyelles-en-Chaussée
- Location within France Location within Hauts-de-France
- Coordinates: 50°12′32″N 1°58′52″E
- Country: France
- Region: Hauts-de-France
- Department: Somme
- Arrondissement: Abbeville
- Canton: Rue
- Intercommunality: CC Ponthieu-Marquenterre

Government
  - Mayor (2020–2026): Bernard Monflier
- Area^{1}: 10.47 km^{2} (4.04 sq mi)
- Elevation: 100 m (330 ft)
- Highest elevation: 106 m (348 ft)
- Lowest elevation: 58 m (190 ft)
- Population (2023): 242
  - Density: 23.1/km^{2} (59.9/sq mi)
- Time zone: UTC+01:00 (CET)
  - Summer (DST): UTC+02:00 (CEST)
- INSEE/Postal code: 80599 /80150
- ^{1} French Land Register data, which excludes lakes, ponds, glaciers > 1 km^{2} (0.386 sq mi or 247 acres) and river estuaries.

Noyelles-en-Chaussée (French pronunciation: [nwajɛl ɑ̃ ʃose]; Picard: Noéyelle-in-Cœuchie) is a commune in the Somme department in Hauts-de-France in northern France.

== Geography ==
The commune is situated on the D108 and D56 crossroads, some 15 miles (24 km) northeast of Abbeville.

== Population ==
Historical population
Year	Pop.	±% p.a.
1968	333	—
1975	303	−1.34%
1982	297	−0.29%
1990	268	−1.28%
1999	248	−0.86%
2007	259	+0.54%
2012	258	−0.08%
2017	243	−1.19%
2023	242	−0.07%
Source: INSEE

== See also ==
- Communes of the Somme department
