= Boufflers =

- Commune
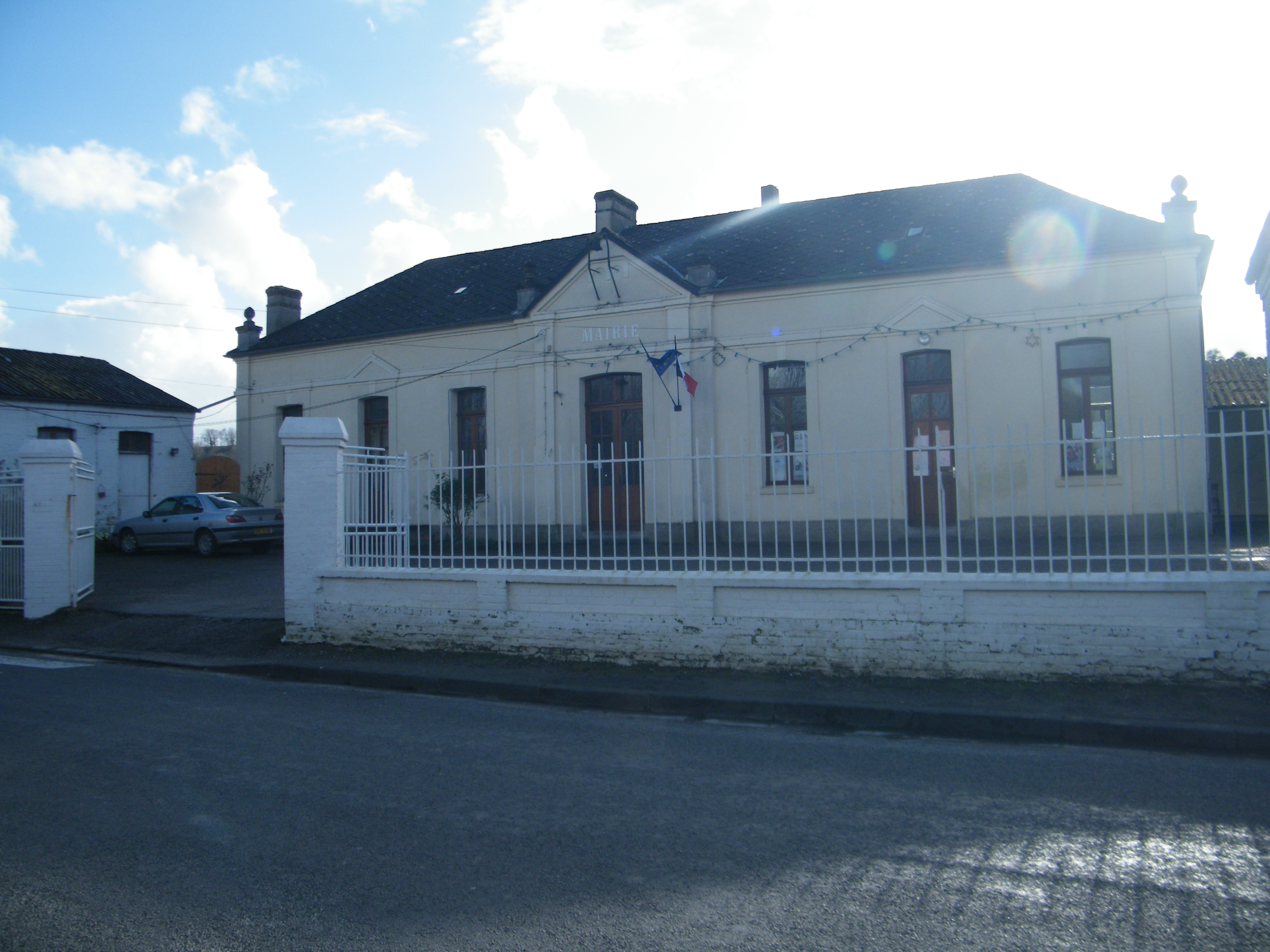
- The town hall and school in Boufflers

- Coat of arms
- Location of Boufflers
- Location within France Location within Hauts-de-France
- Coordinates: 50°15′45″N 2°01′18″E
- Country: France
- Region: Hauts-de-France
- Department: Somme
- Arrondissement: Abbeville
- Canton: Rue
- Intercommunality: CC Ponthieu-Marquenterre

Government
  - Mayor (2020–2026): Vincent Mailly
- Area^{1}: 5.62 km^{2} (2.17 sq mi)
- Elevation: 27 m (89 ft)
- Highest elevation: 89 m (292 ft)
- Lowest elevation: 17 m (56 ft)
- Population (2023): 113
  - Density: 20.1/km^{2} (52.1/sq mi)
- Time zone: UTC+01:00 (CET)
  - Summer (DST): UTC+02:00 (CEST)
- INSEE/Postal code: 80118 /80150
- ^{1} French Land Register data, which excludes lakes, ponds, glaciers > 1 km^{2} (0.386 sq mi or 247 acres) and river estuaries.

Boufflers is a commune in the Somme department in Hauts-de-France in northern France.

== Geography ==
Boufflers is situated on the D224 road, on the banks of the river Authie, the border with the Pas-de-Calais, some 22 miles (35 km) northeast of Abbeville.

== Population ==
Historical population
Year	Pop.	±% p.a.
1968	171	—
1975	135	−3.32%
1982	135	+0.00%
1990	126	−0.86%
1999	129	+0.26%
2007	101	−3.01%
2012	117	+2.98%
2017	122	+0.84%
2023	113	−1.27%
Source: INSEE

== See also ==
- Communes of the Somme department
