= Machy, Somme =

Machy
- Commune
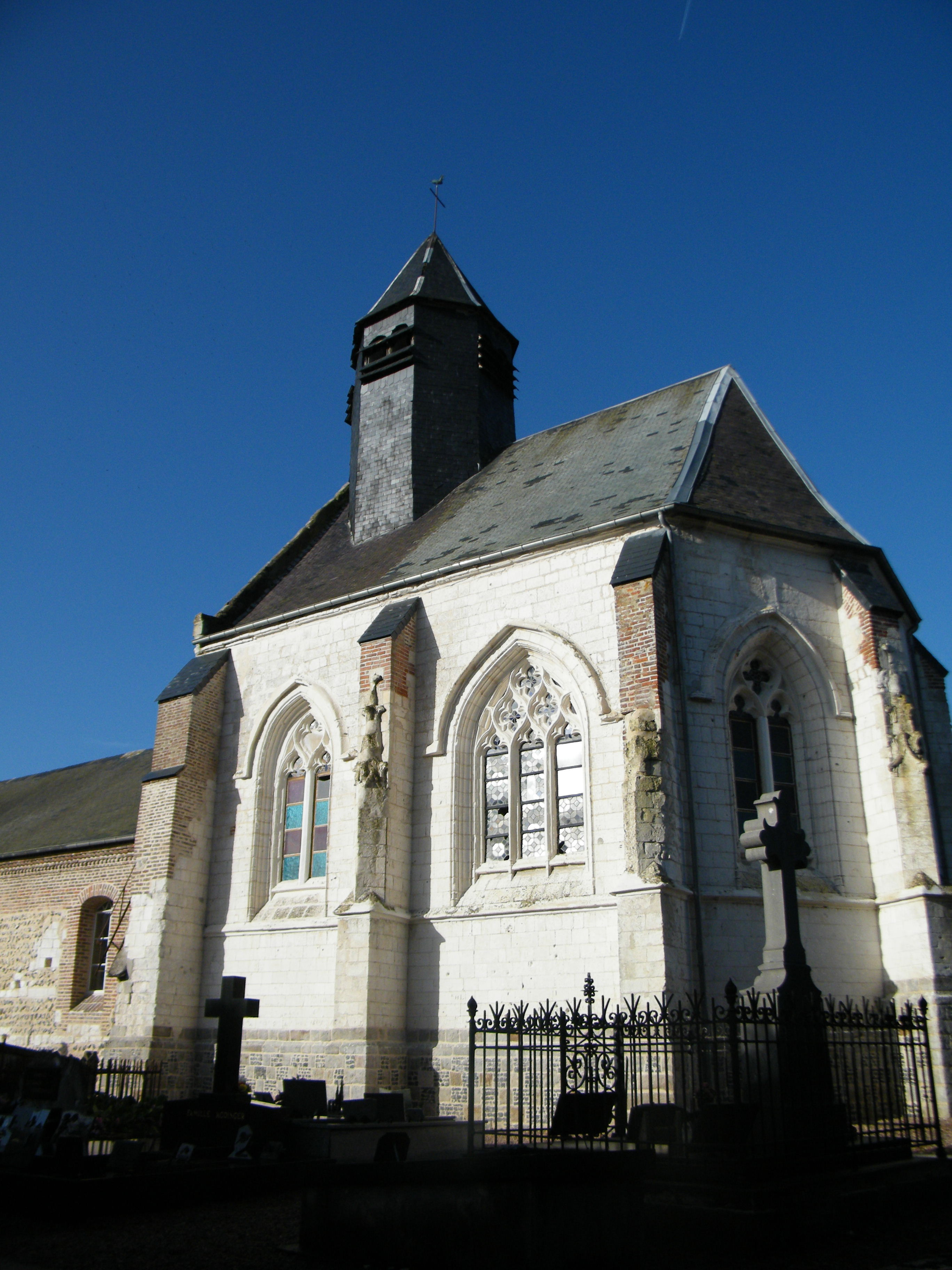
- The church in Machy

- Coat of arms
- Location of Machy
- Location within France Location within Hauts-de-France
- Coordinates: 50°16′18″N 1°48′06″E
- Country: France
- Region: Hauts-de-France
- Department: Somme
- Arrondissement: Abbeville
- Canton: Rue
- Intercommunality: CC Ponthieu-Marquenterre

Government
  - Mayor (2020–2026): Philippe Parment
- Area^{1}: 3.29 km^{2} (1.27 sq mi)
- Elevation: 20 m (66 ft)
- Highest elevation: 62 m (203 ft)
- Lowest elevation: 12 m (39 ft)
- Population (2023): 117
  - Density: 35.6/km^{2} (92.1/sq mi)
- Time zone: UTC+01:00 (CET)
  - Summer (DST): UTC+02:00 (CEST)
- INSEE/Postal code: 80497 /80150
- ^{1} French Land Register data, which excludes lakes, ponds, glaciers > 1 km^{2} (0.386 sq mi or 247 acres) and river estuaries.

Machy (French pronunciation: [maʃi]) is a commune in the Somme department in Hauts-de-France in northern France.

== Geography ==
Machy is situated on the D938 road, some 10 miles (16 km) north of Abbeville.

== Population ==
Historical population
Year	Pop.	±% p.a.
1968	168	—
1975	129	−3.70%
1982	123	−0.68%
1990	116	−0.73%
1999	109	−0.69%
2007	124	+1.62%
2012	128	+0.64%
2017	127	−0.16%
2023	117	−1.36%
Source: INSEE

== See also ==
- Communes of the Somme department
