= Canton of Nouvion =

Coordinates: 50°12′46″N 1°46′29″E

Nouvion
- Former canton
- Interactive map of Nouvion
- Country: France
- Region: Hauts-de-France
- Department: Somme
- No. of communes: {{{nbcomm}}}
- Disbanded: 2015
- Area: 167.60 km^{2} (64.71 sq mi)
- Population (2012): 8,301
  - Density: 49.53/km^{2} (128.3/sq mi)

The Canton of Nouvion is a former canton situated in the department of the Somme and in the former Picardy region of northern France. It was disbanded following the French canton reorganisation which came into effect in March 2015. It consisted of 17 communes, which joined the canton of Abbeville-1 in 2015. It had 8,301 inhabitants (2012).

== Geography ==
The canton is organised around the commune of Nouvion in the arrondissement of Abbeville. The altitude varies from 0 m at Noyelles-sur-Mer to 102 m at Gapennes for an average of 35 m.

The canton comprised 17 communes:

- Agenvillers
- Buigny-Saint-Maclou
- Canchy
- Domvast
- Forest-l'Abbaye
- Forest-Montiers
- Gapennes
- Hautvillers-Ouville
- Lamotte-Buleux
- Millencourt-en-Ponthieu
- Neuilly-l'Hôpital
- Nouvion
- Noyelles-sur-Mer
- Ponthoile
- Port-le-Grand
- Sailly-Flibeaucourt
- Le Titre

== Population ==
1962	1968	1975	1982	1990	1999
7132	7511	7270	7384	7610	7452
Census count starting from 1962 : Population without double counting

== See also ==
- Arrondissements of the Somme department
- Cantons of the Somme department
- Communes of the Somme department
