= Communauté de communes du Canton de Nouvion =

Coordinates: 50.2109°N 1.7794°E

Canton de Nouvion
- Former communauté de communes
- Interactive map of Canton de Nouvion
- Country: France
- Region: Hauts-de-France
- Department: Somme
- No. of communes: {{{nbcomm}}}
- Established: 1996
- Disbanded: 2017

The Communauté de communes du Canton de Nouvion is a former communauté de communes in the Somme département and in the Hauts-de-France région of France. It was created in December 1996. It was merged into the new Communauté de communes du Ponthieu-Marquenterre in January 2017.

== Composition ==
This Communauté de communes included 17 communes:

1. Agenvillers
2. Buigny-Saint-Maclou
3. Canchy
4. Domvast
5. Forest-l'Abbaye
6. Forest-Montiers
7. Gapennes
8. Hautvillers-Ouville
9. Lamotte-Buleux
10. Le Titre
11. Millencourt-en-Ponthieu
12. Neuilly-l'Hôpital
13. Nouvion
14. Noyelles-sur-Mer
15. Ponthoile
16. Port-le-Grand
17. Sailly-Flibeaucourt

== See also ==
- Communes of the Somme department
