= Canton of Abbeville-Nord =

Coordinates: 50°6′21″N 1°50′9″E

Abbeville-Nord
- Former canton
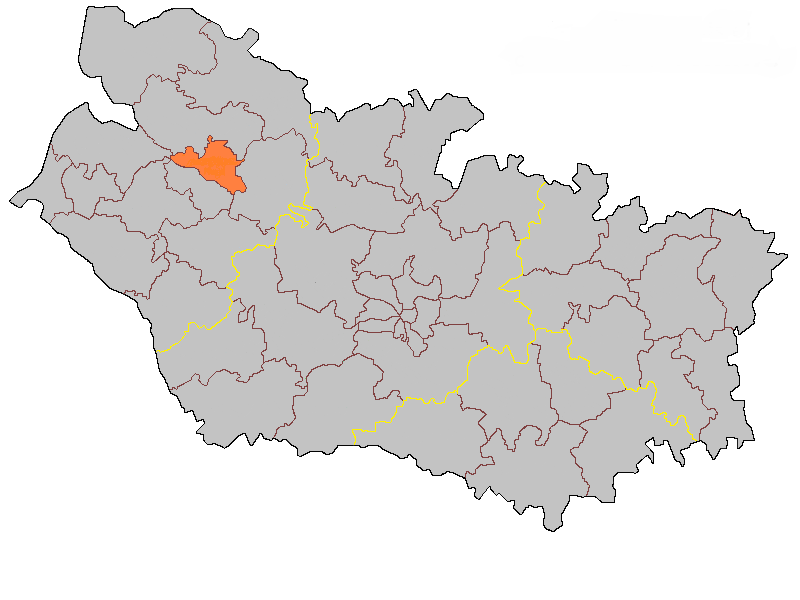
- Country: France
- Region: Hauts-de-France
- Department: Somme
- No. of communes: {{{nbcomm}}}
- Disbanded: 2015
- Population (2012): 16,905

The Canton of Abbeville-Nord is a former canton situated in the department of the Somme and in the Picardy region of northern France. It was disbanded following the French canton reorganisation which came into effect in March 2015. It had 16,905 inhabitants (2012).

== Geography ==
The canton was organised around the commune of Abbeville in the arrondissement of Abbeville. The altitude varies from 2m at Drucat to 95m at Bellancourt.

The canton comprised 7 communes:

- Abbeville (partly)
- Bellancourt
- Caours
- Drucat
- Grand-Laviers
- Neufmoulin
- Vauchelles-les-Quesnoy}

== See also ==
- Arrondissements of the Somme department
- Cantons of the Somme department
- Communes of the Somme department
