= Maison-Ponthieu =

- Commune
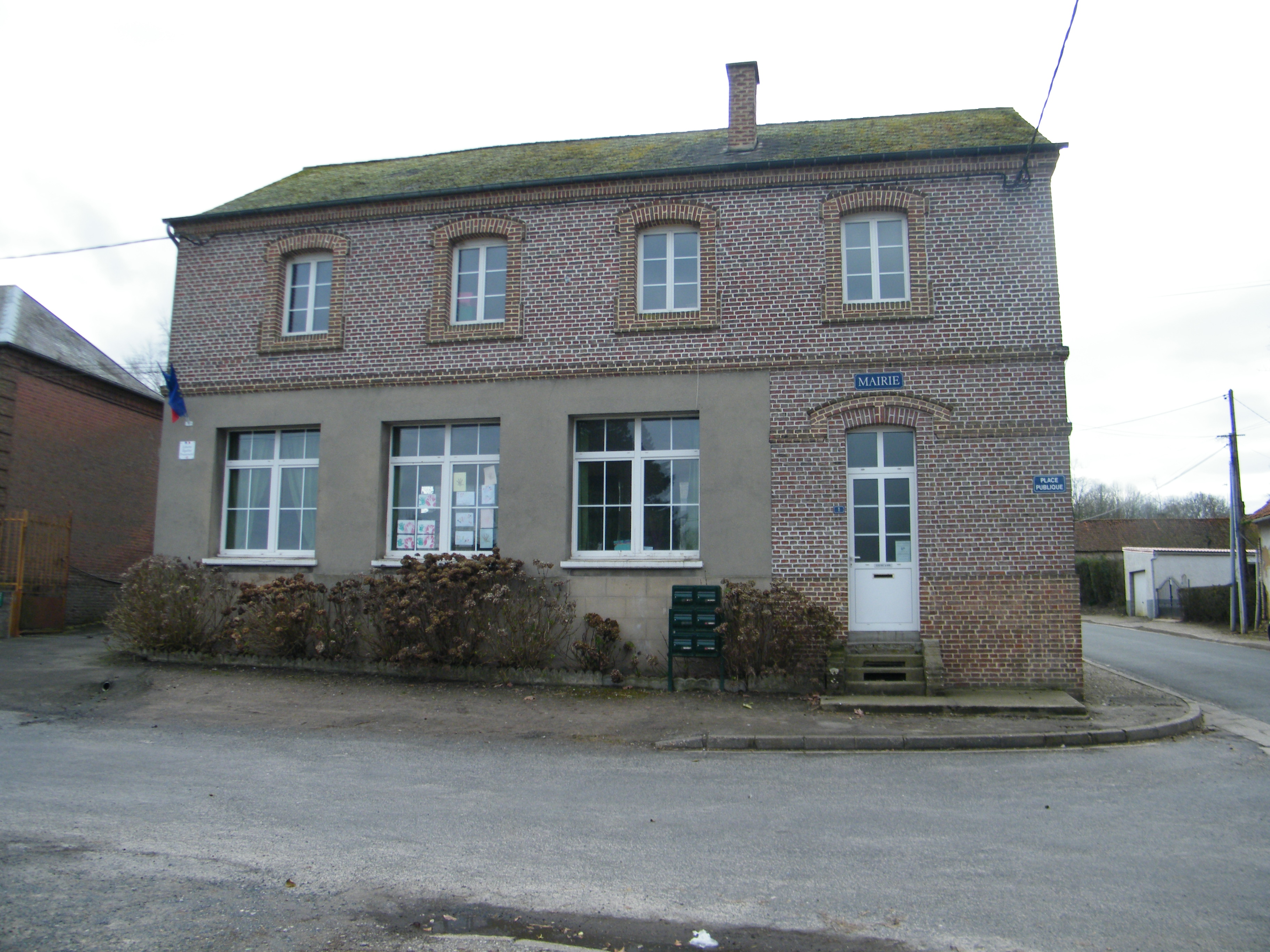
- The town hall and school in Maison-Ponthieu

- Coat of arms
- Location of Maison-Ponthieu
- Location within France Location within Hauts-de-France
- Coordinates: 50°12′30″N 2°02′38″E
- Country: France
- Region: Hauts-de-France
- Department: Somme
- Arrondissement: Abbeville
- Canton: Rue
- Intercommunality: CC Ponthieu-Marquenterre

Government
  - Mayor (2020–2026): Antoine Bacquet
- Area^{1}: 10.95 km^{2} (4.23 sq mi)
- Elevation: 95 m (312 ft)
- Highest elevation: 123 m (404 ft)
- Lowest elevation: 62 m (203 ft)
- Population (2023): 280
  - Density: 26/km^{2} (66/sq mi)
- Time zone: UTC+01:00 (CET)
  - Summer (DST): UTC+02:00 (CEST)
- INSEE/Postal code: 80501 /80150
- ^{1} French Land Register data, which excludes lakes, ponds, glaciers > 1 km^{2} (0.386 sq mi or 247 acres) and river estuaries.

Maison-Ponthieu (Picard: Moaison-Pontiu) is a commune in the Somme department in Hauts-de-France in northern France.

== Geography ==
The commune is situated on the D56e road, some 24 kilometres (15 mi) northeast of Abbeville.

== Population ==
Historical population
Year	Pop.	±% p.a.
1968	348	—
1975	301	−2.05%
1982	252	−2.51%
1990	273	+1.01%
1999	278	+0.20%
2007	277	−0.05%
2012	270	−0.51%
2017	274	+0.29%
2023	280	+0.36%
Source: INSEE

== See also ==
- Communes of the Somme department
