= Gueschart =

- Commune
- The town hall in Gueschart

- Coat of arms
- Location of Gueschart
- Location within France Location within Hauts-de-France
- Coordinates: 50°14′28″N 2°00′48″E
- Country: France
- Region: Hauts-de-France
- Department: Somme
- Arrondissement: Abbeville
- Canton: Rue
- Intercommunality: CC Ponthieu-Marquenterre

Government
  - Mayor (2020–2026): Fabien Carpentier
- Area^{1}: 12.89 km^{2} (4.98 sq mi)
- Elevation: 100 m (330 ft)
- Highest elevation: 102 m (335 ft)
- Lowest elevation: 45 m (148 ft)
- Population (2023): 361
  - Density: 28.0/km^{2} (72.5/sq mi)
- Time zone: UTC+01:00 (CET)
  - Summer (DST): UTC+02:00 (CEST)
- INSEE/Postal code: 80396 /80150
- ^{1} French Land Register data, which excludes lakes, ponds, glaciers > 1 km^{2} (0.386 sq mi or 247 acres) and river estuaries.

Gueschart (French pronunciation: [ɡɛʃaʁ]; Picard: Djéchart) is a commune in the Somme department in Hauts-de-France in northern France. It was the target of bombing raids during the Second World War aimed at destroying nearby V1 launch sites, whose foundations can still be seen on the south-west outskirts of the village, near the D938.

== Geography ==
Gueschart is situated on the D938 road, a mile from the banks of the river Authie, the border with the Pas-de-Calais, some 14 miles (23 km) northeast of Abbeville.

== Population ==
Historical population
Year	Pop.	±% p.a.
1968	453	—
1975	406	−1.55%
1982	380	−0.94%
1990	345	−1.20%
1999	324	−0.70%
2007	320	−0.16%
2012	314	−0.38%
2017	335	+1.30%
2023	361	+1.25%
Source: INSEE

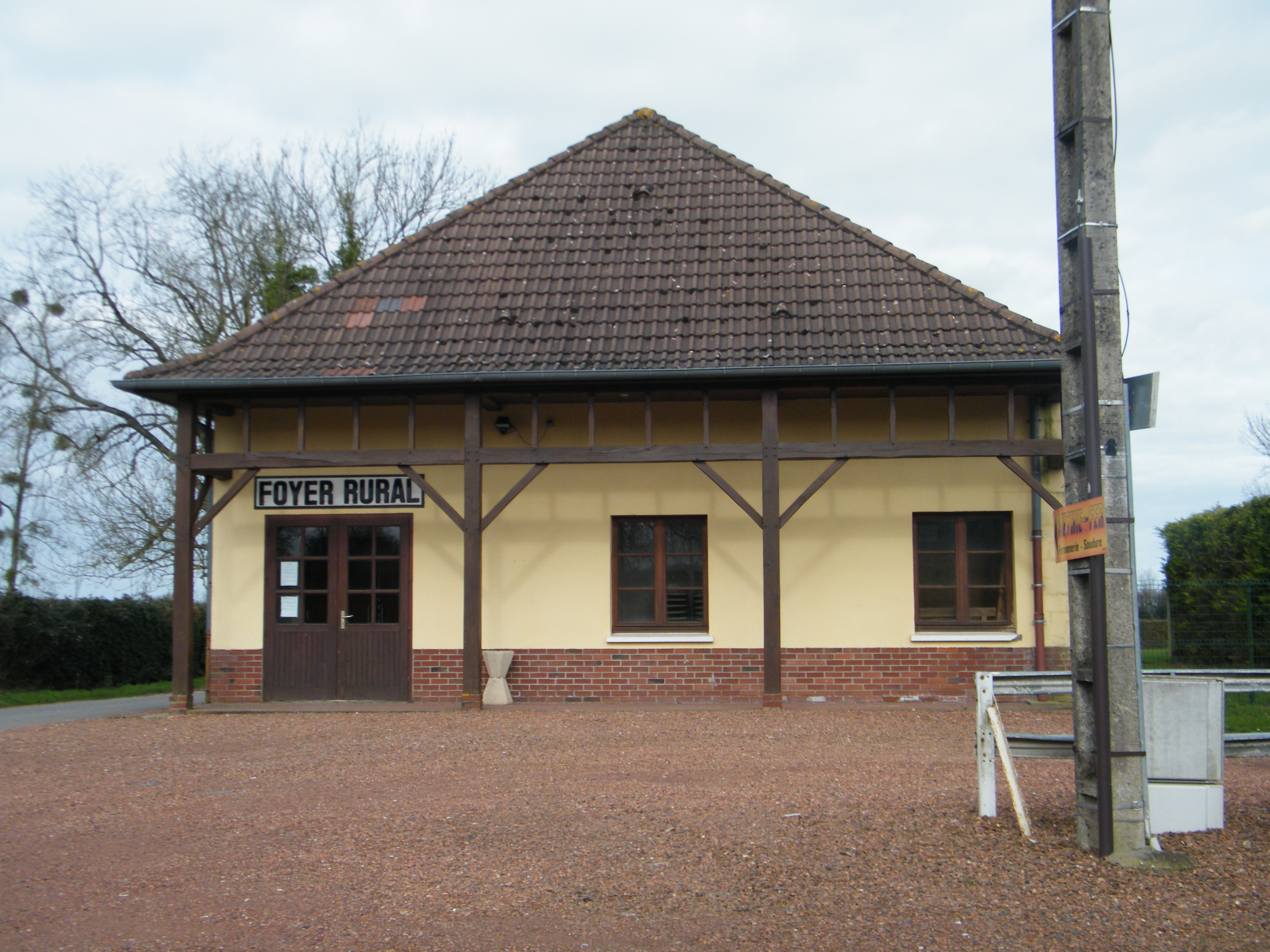
Community hall.

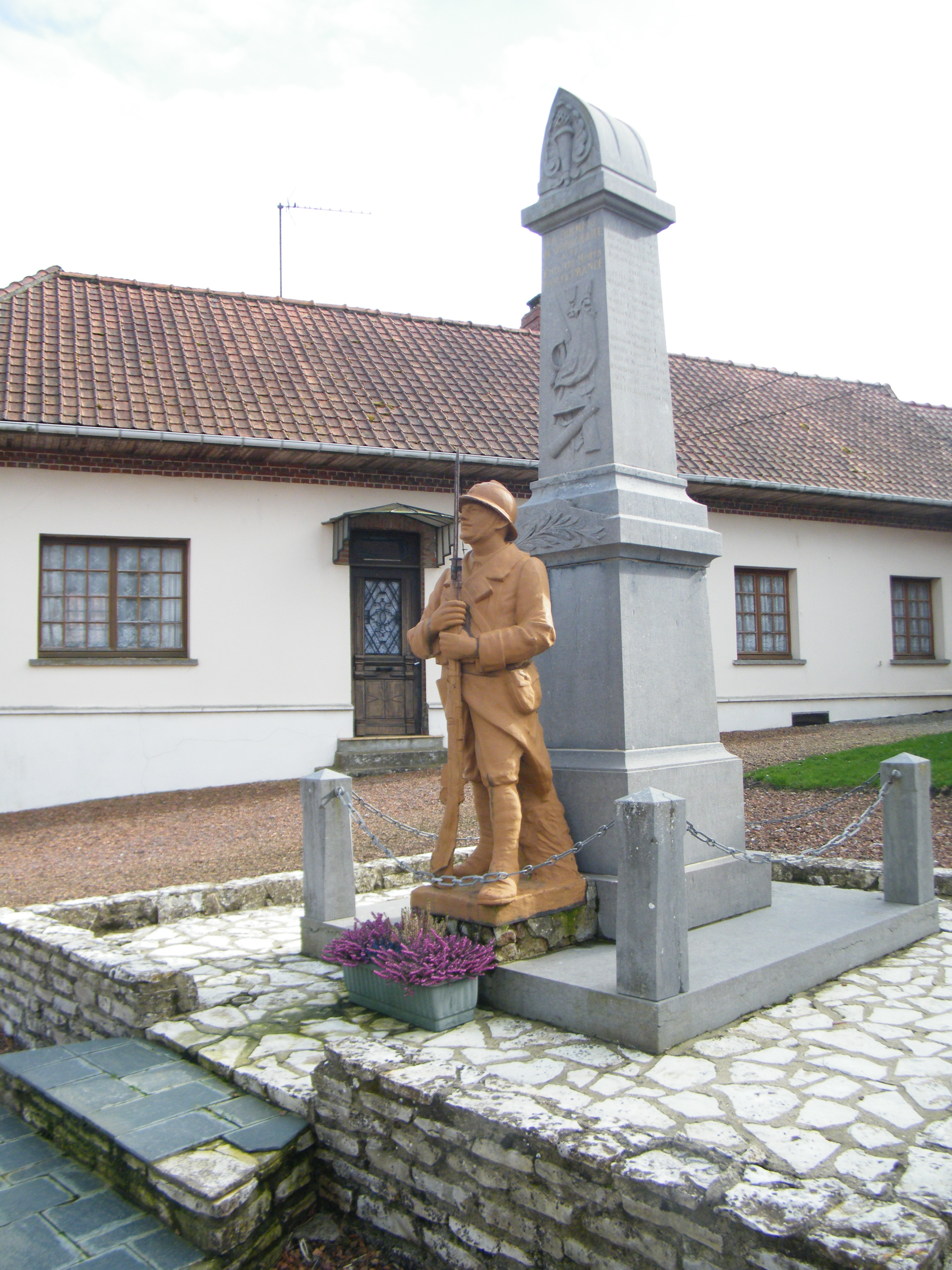
WW1 monument.

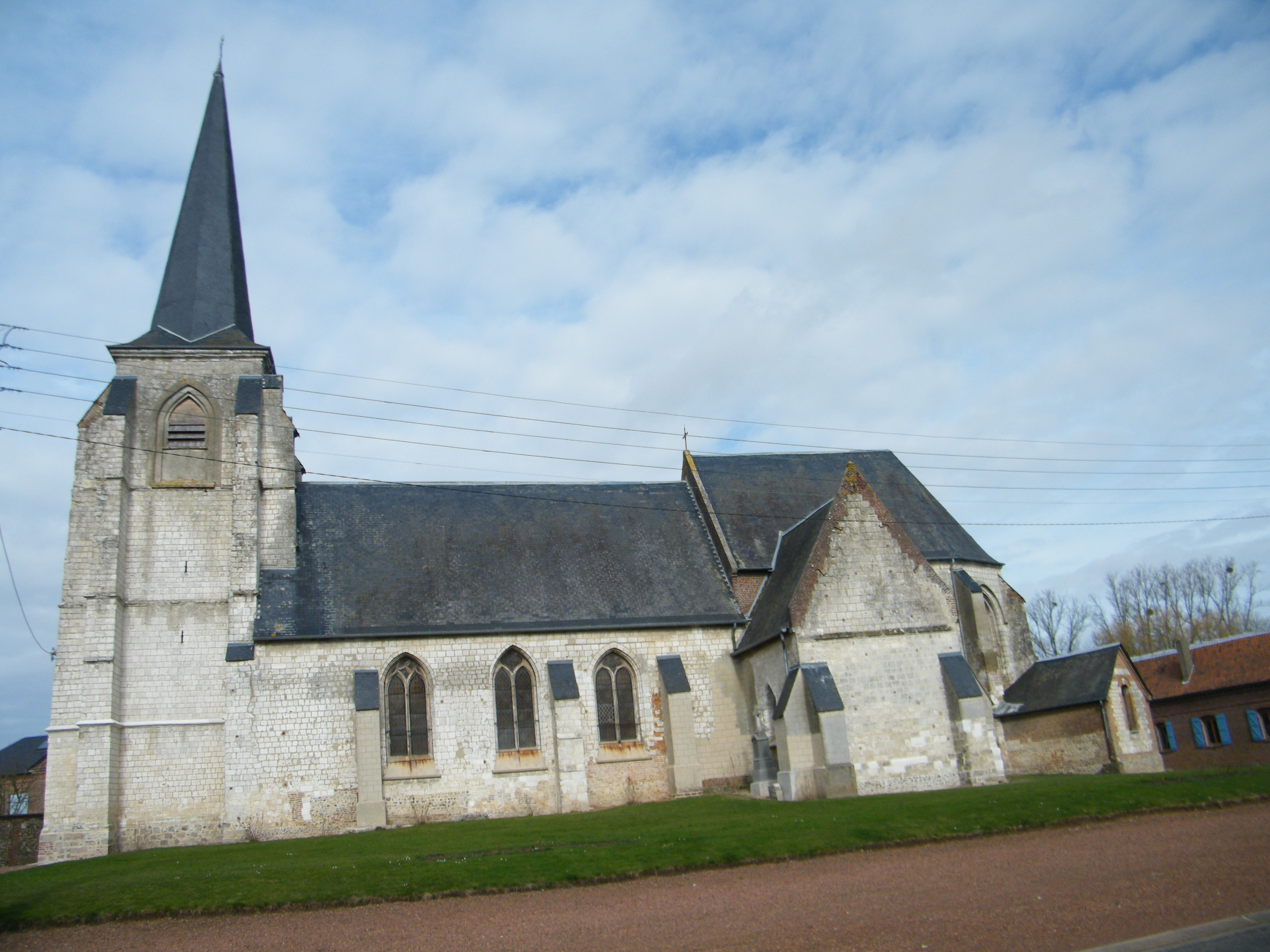
Saint Fursey Church.

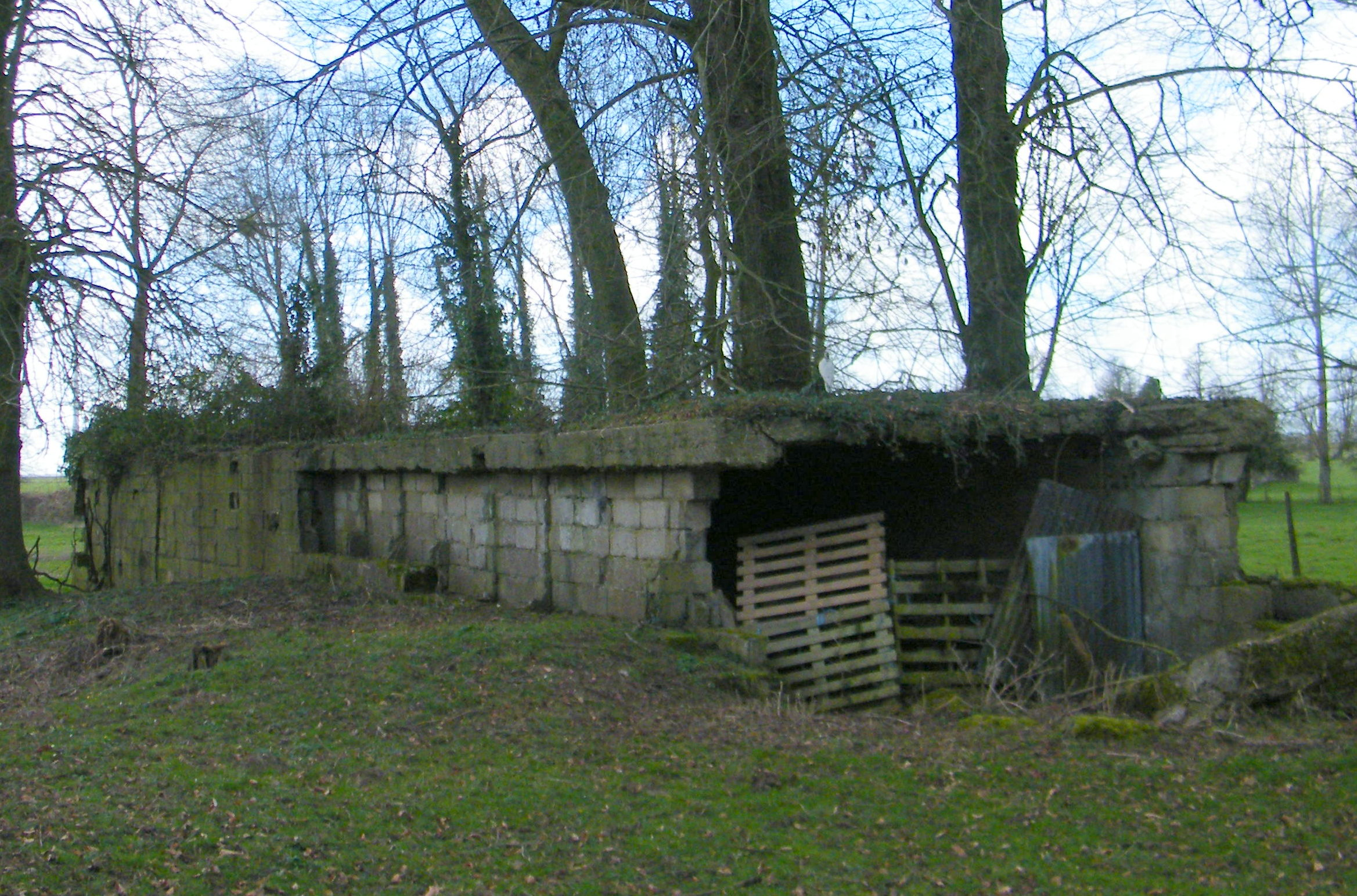
V1 launch site (vestiges).

== See also ==
- Communes of the Somme department
