= Communauté de communes Ponthieu-Marquenterre =

Federation of municipalities in France

Ponthieu-Marquenterre
- Communauté de communes
- Interactive map of Ponthieu-Marquenterre
- Coordinates: 50°16′N 01°40′E
- Country: France
- Region: Hauts-de-France
- Department: Somme
- No. of communes: {{{nbcomm}}}
- Established: 2017
- Area: 783.7 km^{2} (302.6 sq mi)
- Population (2019): 32,952
  - Density: 42.05/km^{2} (108.9/sq mi)

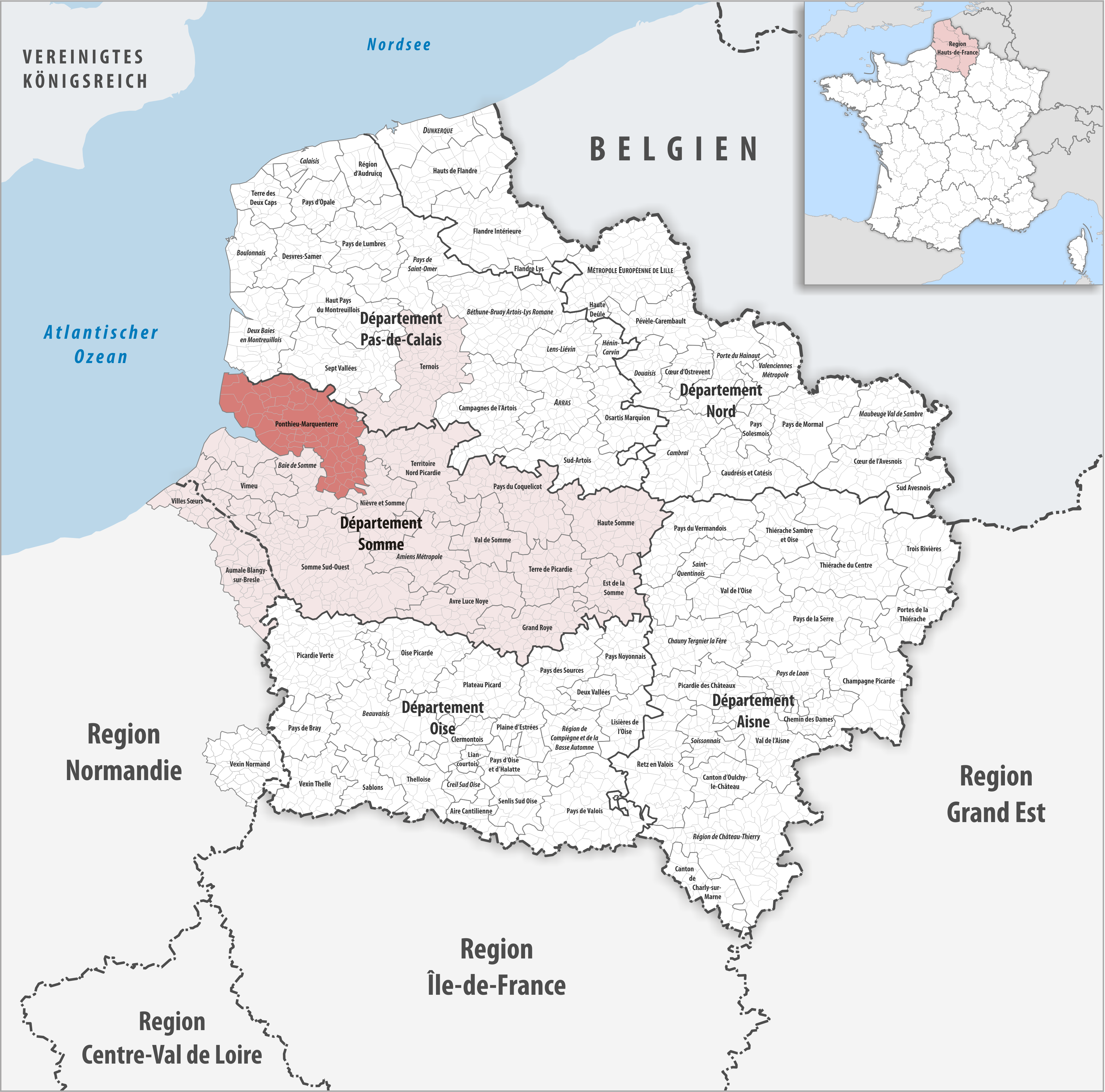
map

The Communauté de communes Ponthieu-Marquenterre is a communauté de communes in the Somme département and in the Hauts-de-France région of France. It was formed on 1 January 2017 by the merger of the former Communauté de communes Authie-Maye, the Communauté de communes du Canton de Nouvion and the Communauté de communes du Haut Clocher. It consists of 70 communes, and its seat is in Rue. Its area is 783.7 km^{2}, and its population was 32,952 in 2019.

== Composition ==
The communauté de communes consists of the following 70 communes:

1. Agenvillers
2. Ailly-le-Haut-Clocher
3. Argoules
4. Arry
5. Bernay-en-Ponthieu
6. Le Boisle
7. Boufflers
8. Brailly-Cornehotte
9. Brucamps
10. Buigny-l'Abbé
11. Buigny-Saint-Maclou
12. Bussus-lès-Yaucourt
13. Canchy
14. Cocquerel
15. Coulonvillers
16. Cramont
17. Crécy-en-Ponthieu
18. Le Crotoy
19. Dominois
20. Dompierre-sur-Authie
21. Domqueur
22. Domvast
23. Ergnies
24. Estrées-lès-Crécy
25. Favières
26. Fontaine-sur-Maye
27. Forest-l'Abbaye
28. Forest-Montiers
29. Fort-Mahon-Plage
30. Francières
31. Froyelles
32. Gapennes
33. Gorenflos
34. Gueschart
35. Hautvillers-Ouville
36. Lamotte-Buleux
37. Ligescourt
38. Long
39. Machiel
40. Machy
41. Maison-Ponthieu
42. Maison-Roland
43. Mesnil-Domqueur
44. Millencourt-en-Ponthieu
45. Mouflers
46. Nampont
47. Neuilly-le-Dien
48. Neuilly-l'Hôpital
49. Nouvion
50. Noyelles-en-Chaussée
51. Noyelles-sur-Mer
52. Oneux
53. Ponches-Estruval
54. Ponthoile
55. Pont-Remy
56. Port-le-Grand
57. Quend
58. Regnière-Écluse
59. Rue
60. Sailly-Flibeaucourt
61. Saint-Quentin-en-Tourmont
62. Saint-Riquier
63. Le Titre
64. Vercourt
65. Villers-sous-Ailly
66. Villers-sur-Authie
67. Vironchaux
68. Vron
69. Yvrench
70. Yvrencheux
