= Canton of Abbeville-1 =

Coordinates: 50.11°N 1.84°E

The canton of Abbeville-1 is an administrative division of the Somme department, in northern France. It was created at the French canton reorganisation which came into effect in March 2015. Its seat is in Abbeville.

It consists of the following communes:

1. Abbeville (partly)
2. Agenvillers
3. Bellancourt
4. Buigny-Saint-Maclou
5. Canchy
6. Caours
7. Domvast
8. Drucat
9. Forest-l'Abbaye
10. Forest-Montiers
11. Gapennes
12. Grand-Laviers
13. Hautvillers-Ouville
14. Lamotte-Buleux
15. Millencourt-en-Ponthieu
16. Neufmoulin
17. Neuilly-l'Hôpital
18. Nouvion
19. Noyelles-sur-Mer
20. Ponthoile
21. Port-le-Grand
22. Sailly-Flibeaucourt
23. Le Titre
24. Vauchelles-les-Quesnoy
