= Vauchelles-les-Quesnoy =

- Commune
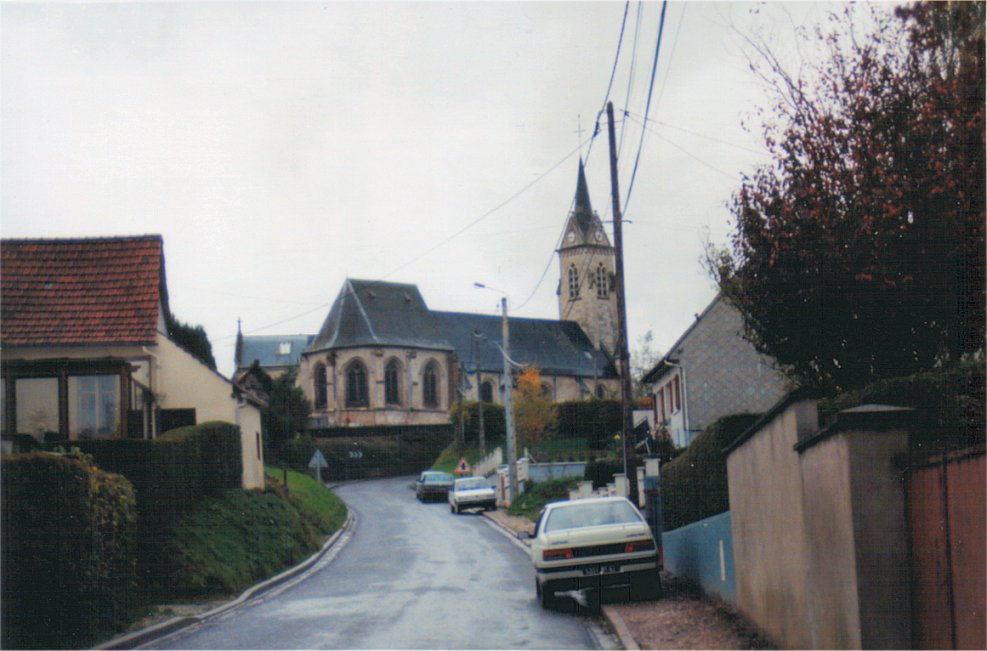
- Notre Dame church

- Coat of arms
- Location of Vauchelles-les-Quesnoy
- Location within France Location within Hauts-de-France
- Coordinates: 50°06′14″N 1°53′25″E
- Country: France
- Region: Hauts-de-France
- Department: Somme
- Arrondissement: Abbeville
- Canton: Abbeville-1
- Intercommunality: CA Baie de Somme

Government
  - Mayor (2020–2026): Régis Patte
- Area^{1}: 6.14 km^{2} (2.37 sq mi)
- Elevation: 128 m (420 ft)
- Highest elevation: 79 m (259 ft)
- Lowest elevation: 19 m (62 ft)
- Population (2023): 815
  - Density: 133/km^{2} (344/sq mi)
- Time zone: UTC+01:00 (CET)
  - Summer (DST): UTC+02:00 (CEST)
- INSEE/Postal code: 80779 /80132
- ^{1} French Land Register data, which excludes lakes, ponds, glaciers > 1 km^{2} (0.386 sq mi or 247 acres) and river estuaries.

Vauchelles-les-Quesnoy (French pronunciation: [voʃɛl le kenwa]) is a commune in the Somme department in Hauts-de-France in northern France.

== Geography ==
The commune is situated 3 kilometres (2 mi) east of the centre of Abbeville, on the D153 road

== Population ==
Historical population
| Year | Pop. | ±% p.a. |
|---|---|---|
| 1968 | 640 | — |
| 1975 | 734 | +1.98% |
| 1982 | 856 | +2.22% |
| 1990 | 889 | +0.47% |
| 1999 | 830 | −0.76% |
| 2007 | 899 | +1.00% |
| 2012 | 839 | −1.37% |
| 2017 | 851 | +0.28% |
| 2023 | 815 | −0.72% |
Source: INSEE

== Places of interest ==
The church of Notre Dame de l'Assomption, built at the top of a small hill, is in the Gothic style and dates from the fifteenth century. On a wall inside there's a plaque dedicated to Nicolas du Moncel, seigneur of Vascongnes, who died in 1487. Like all churches dedicated to the Virgin, it is built with a noticeably narrow transept.

== See also ==
- Communes of the Somme department
