= Neufmoulin =

- Commune
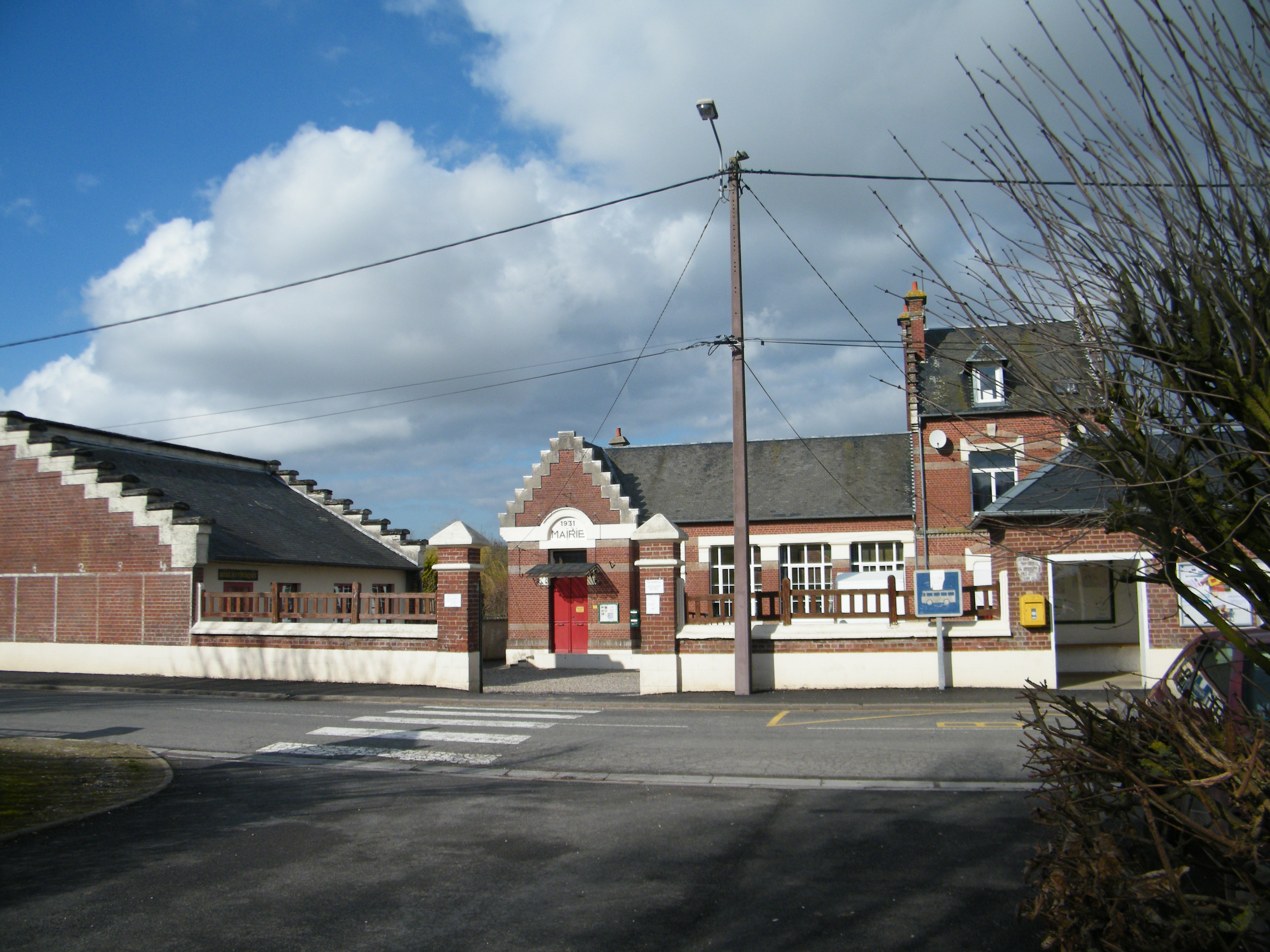
- The town hall and school in Neufmoulin
- Location of Neufmoulin
- Location within France Location within Hauts-de-France
- Coordinates: 50°07′47″N 1°54′40″E
- Country: France
- Region: Hauts-de-France
- Department: Somme
- Arrondissement: Abbeville
- Canton: Abbeville-1
- Intercommunality: CA Baie de Somme

Government
  - Mayor (2020–2026): Anne-Marie Dorion
- Area^{1}: 4.43 km^{2} (1.71 sq mi)
- Elevation: 32 m (105 ft)
- Highest elevation: 86 m (282 ft)
- Lowest elevation: 11 m (36 ft)
- Population (2023): 368
  - Density: 83.1/km^{2} (215/sq mi)
- Time zone: UTC+01:00 (CET)
  - Summer (DST): UTC+02:00 (CEST)
- INSEE/Postal code: 80588 /80132
- ^{1} French Land Register data, which excludes lakes, ponds, glaciers > 1 km^{2} (0.386 sq mi or 247 acres) and river estuaries.

Neufmoulin is a commune in the Somme department in Hauts-de-France in northern France.

== Geography ==
Neufmoulin is situated on the D482 road, 4 miles (6.4 km) northeast of Abbeville.

== Population ==
Historical population
Year	Pop.	±% p.a.
1968	217	—
1975	270	+3.17%
1982	337	+3.22%
1990	368	+1.11%
1999	345	−0.71%
2007	351	+0.22%
2012	359	+0.45%
2017	361	+0.11%
2023	368	+0.32%
Source: INSEE

== See also ==
- Communes of the Somme department
