= Caours =

- Commune
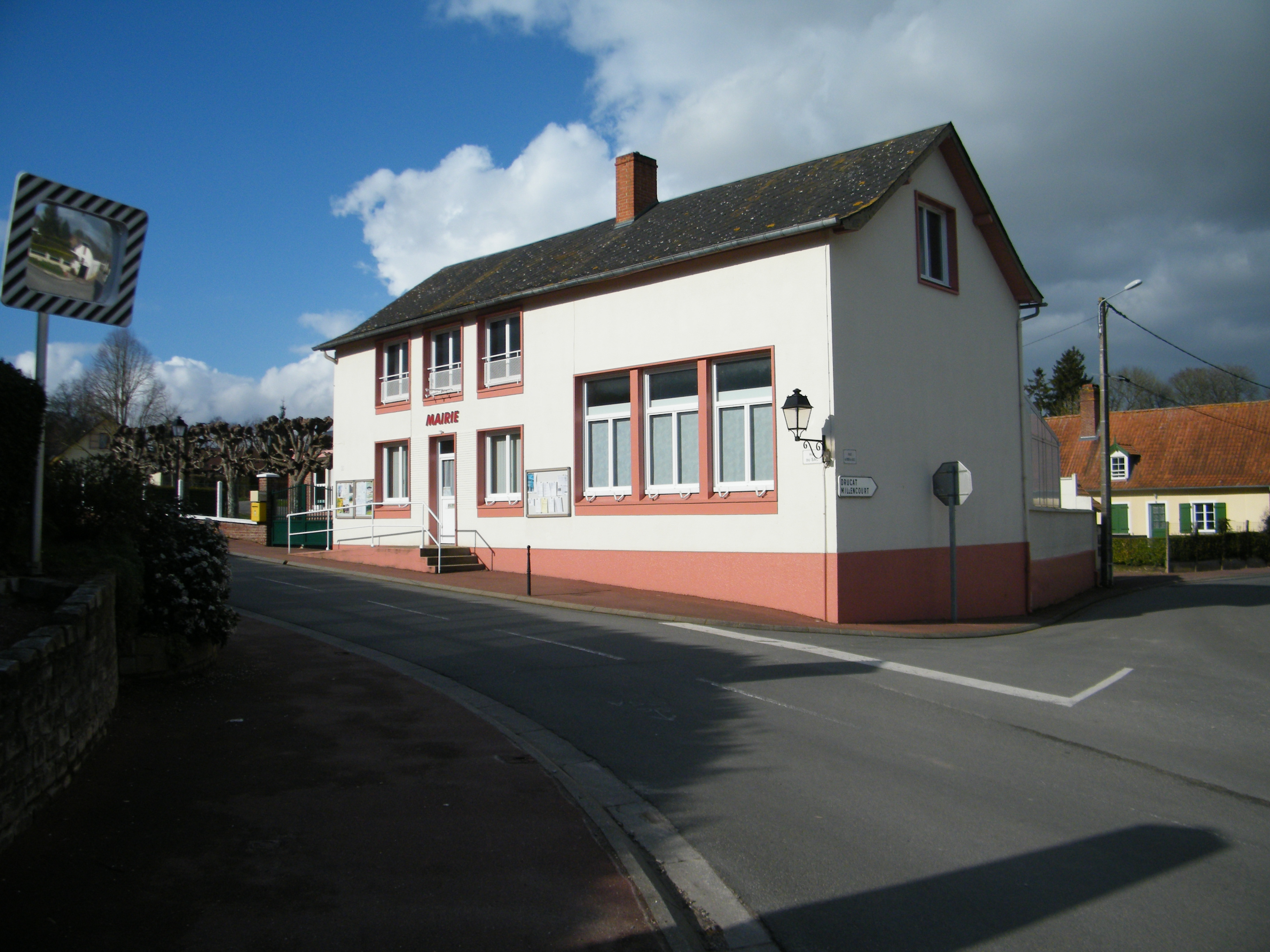
- The town hall in Caours
- Location of Caours
- Location within France Location within Hauts-de-France
- Coordinates: 50°07′53″N 1°52′59″E
- Country: France
- Region: Hauts-de-France
- Department: Somme
- Arrondissement: Abbeville
- Canton: Abbeville-1
- Intercommunality: CA Baie de Somme

Government
  - Mayor (2020–2026): Bernard Duquesne
- Area^{1}: 6.13 km^{2} (2.37 sq mi)
- Elevation: 15 m (49 ft)
- Highest elevation: 87 m (285 ft)
- Lowest elevation: 6 m (20 ft)
- Population (2023): 548
  - Density: 89.4/km^{2} (232/sq mi)
- Time zone: UTC+01:00 (CET)
  - Summer (DST): UTC+02:00 (CEST)
- INSEE/Postal code: 80171 /80132
- ^{1} French Land Register data, which excludes lakes, ponds, glaciers > 1 km^{2} (0.386 sq mi or 247 acres) and river estuaries.

Caours (French pronunciation: [ka.uʁ]; Picard: Cœu) is a commune in the Somme department in Hauts-de-France in northern France.

== Geography ==
Caours is situated some 3 miles (5 km) northeast of Abbeville, on the D482 road heading towards Saint-Riquier.

== Population ==
Historical population
Year	Pop.	±% p.a.
1968	388	—
1975	508	+3.92%
1982	567	+1.58%
1990	599	+0.69%
1999	592	−0.13%
2007	598	+0.13%
2012	610	+0.40%
2017	603	−0.23%
2023	548	−1.58%
Source: INSEE

== History ==
=== Stone-age archaeology ===
The fluvial deposits of the Somme around Caours have been well known to archaeologists in the latter part of the 20th century, are remains of a time when climate was more temperate. The last interglacial, once known under the name of Riss-Würm, was between 130,000 and 115,000 years ago. The area has produced the remains of mammals of this Paleolithic era, notably antlers and bone. A joint research programme by the INRAP and the CNRS in 2005, has produced interesting results about Neandertal man.

The theory that once explained the disappearance of the Neandertals, the inability to adapt to climatic
change has suddenly been put into perspective by the site of Caours.

== See also ==
- Communes of the Somme department
