= Drucat =

- Commune
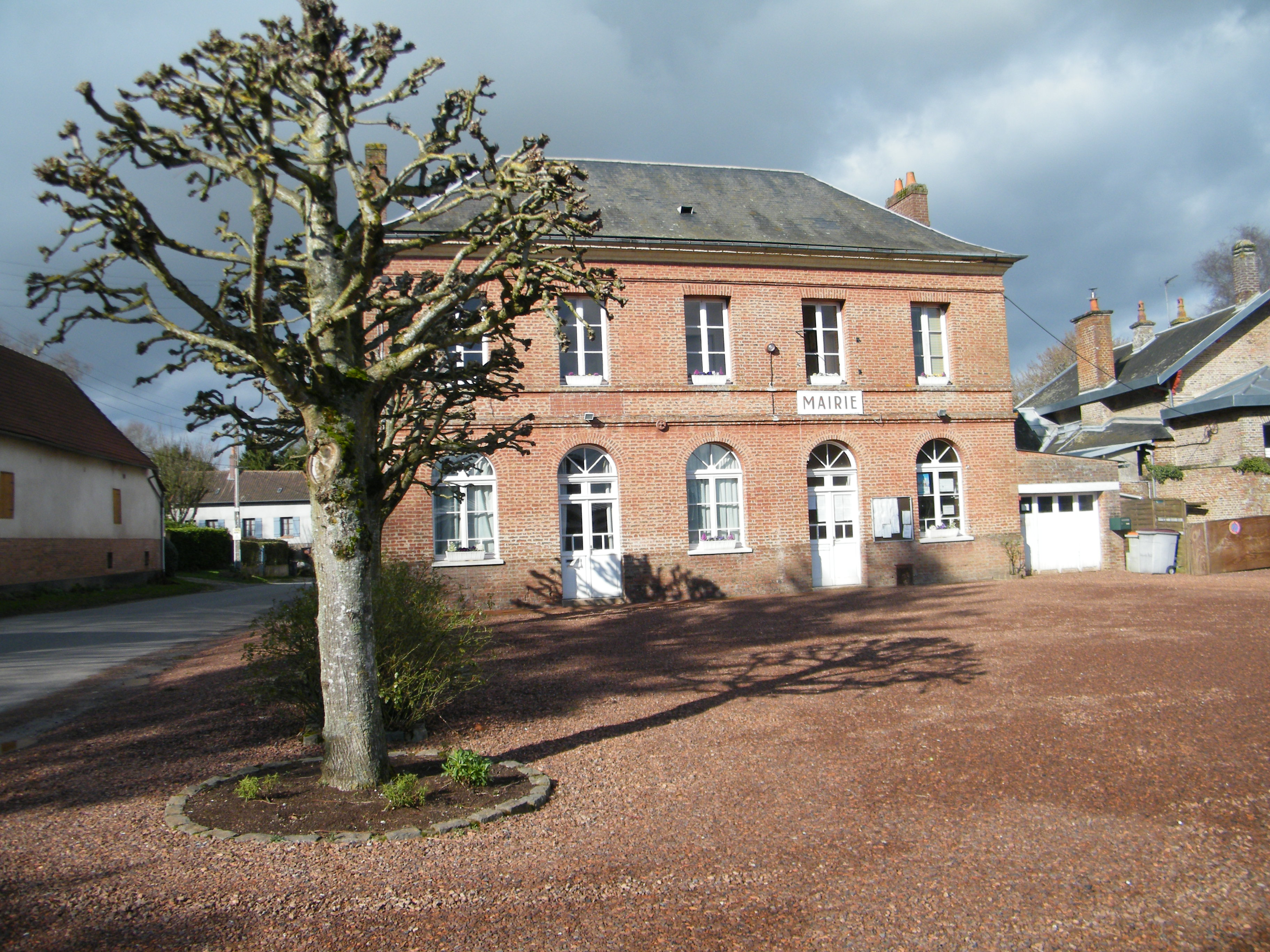
- The town hall in Drucat

- Coat of arms
- Location of Drucat
- Location within France Location within Hauts-de-France
- Coordinates: 50°08′37″N 1°52′19″E
- Country: France
- Region: Hauts-de-France
- Department: Somme
- Arrondissement: Abbeville
- Canton: Abbeville-1
- Intercommunality: CA Baie de Somme

Government
  - Mayor (2020–2026): Laurent Parsis
- Area^{1}: 10.84 km^{2} (4.19 sq mi)
- Elevation: 26 m (85 ft)
- Highest elevation: 81 m (266 ft)
- Lowest elevation: 6 m (20 ft)
- Population (2023): 887
  - Density: 81.8/km^{2} (212/sq mi)
- Time zone: UTC+01:00 (CET)
  - Summer (DST): UTC+02:00 (CEST)
- INSEE/Postal code: 80260 /80132
- ^{1} French Land Register data, which excludes lakes, ponds, glaciers > 1 km^{2} (0.386 sq mi or 247 acres) and river estuaries.

Drucat (French pronunciation: [dʁyka]; Picard: Drucot ) is a commune in the Somme department in Hauts-de-France in northern France.

== Geography ==
Drucat is situated on the D82e road, some 4 miles (6 km) northeast of Abbeville.

== Population ==
Historical population
Year	Pop.	±% p.a.
1968	504	—
1975	733	+5.50%
1982	841	+1.98%
1990	890	+0.71%
1999	861	−0.37%
2007	873	+0.17%
2012	864	−0.21%
2017	921	+1.29%
2023	887	−0.62%
Source: INSEE

== History ==
There was a station on the Réseau des Bains de Mer, called Plessiel-Drucat, which opened on 19 June 1892 and closed on 10 March 1947.

== Places of interest ==
- Saint Martin's church.
- The recently restored chapel.
- Plessiel water-tower

== Personalities ==
- The composer Jean-François Lesueur (1760–1837) was born at Plessiel, a hamlet within the commune of Drucat. The village hall is named in his honour.

== See also ==
- Communes of the Somme department
- Réseau des Bains de Mer
