= Bellancourt =

- Commune
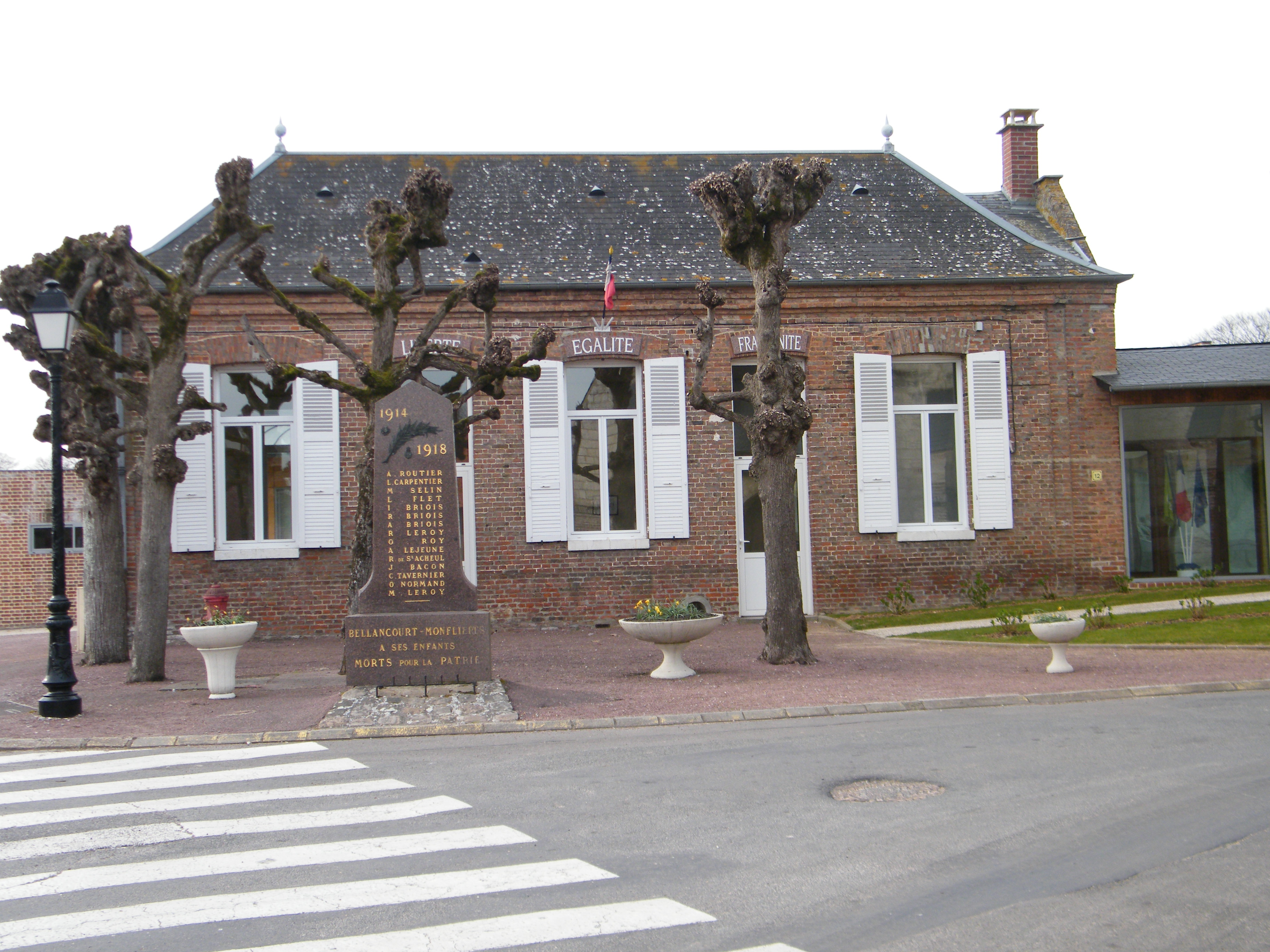
- The town hall in Bellancourt

- Coat of arms
- Location of Bellancourt
- Location within France Location within Hauts-de-France
- Coordinates: 50°05′27″N 1°54′38″E
- Country: France
- Region: Hauts-de-France
- Department: Somme
- Arrondissement: Abbeville
- Canton: Abbeville-1
- Intercommunality: CA Baie de Somme

Government
  - Mayor (2022–2026): Annie Leplomb
- Area^{1}: 5.98 km^{2} (2.31 sq mi)
- Elevation: 80 m (260 ft)
- Highest elevation: 95 m (312 ft)
- Lowest elevation: 38 m (125 ft)
- Population (2023): 494
  - Density: 82.6/km^{2} (214/sq mi)
- Time zone: UTC+01:00 (CET)
  - Summer (DST): UTC+02:00 (CEST)
- INSEE/Postal code: 80078 /80132
- ^{1} French Land Register data, which excludes lakes, ponds, glaciers > 1 km^{2} (0.386 sq mi or 247 acres) and river estuaries.

Bellancourt (French pronunciation: [bɛlɑ̃kuʁ]) is a commune in the Somme department in Hauts-de-France in northern France.

== Geography ==
Bellancourt is situated on the N1 road, some 3 miles (5 km) southeast of Abbeville.

== Population ==
Historical population
Year	Pop.	±% p.a.
1968	245	—
1975	287	+2.29%
1982	421	+5.63%
1990	480	+1.65%
1999	429	−1.24%
2007	497	+1.86%
2012	510	+0.52%
2017	513	+0.12%
2023	494	−0.63%
Source: INSEE

== See also ==
- Communes of the Somme department
