= Grand-Laviers =

- Commune
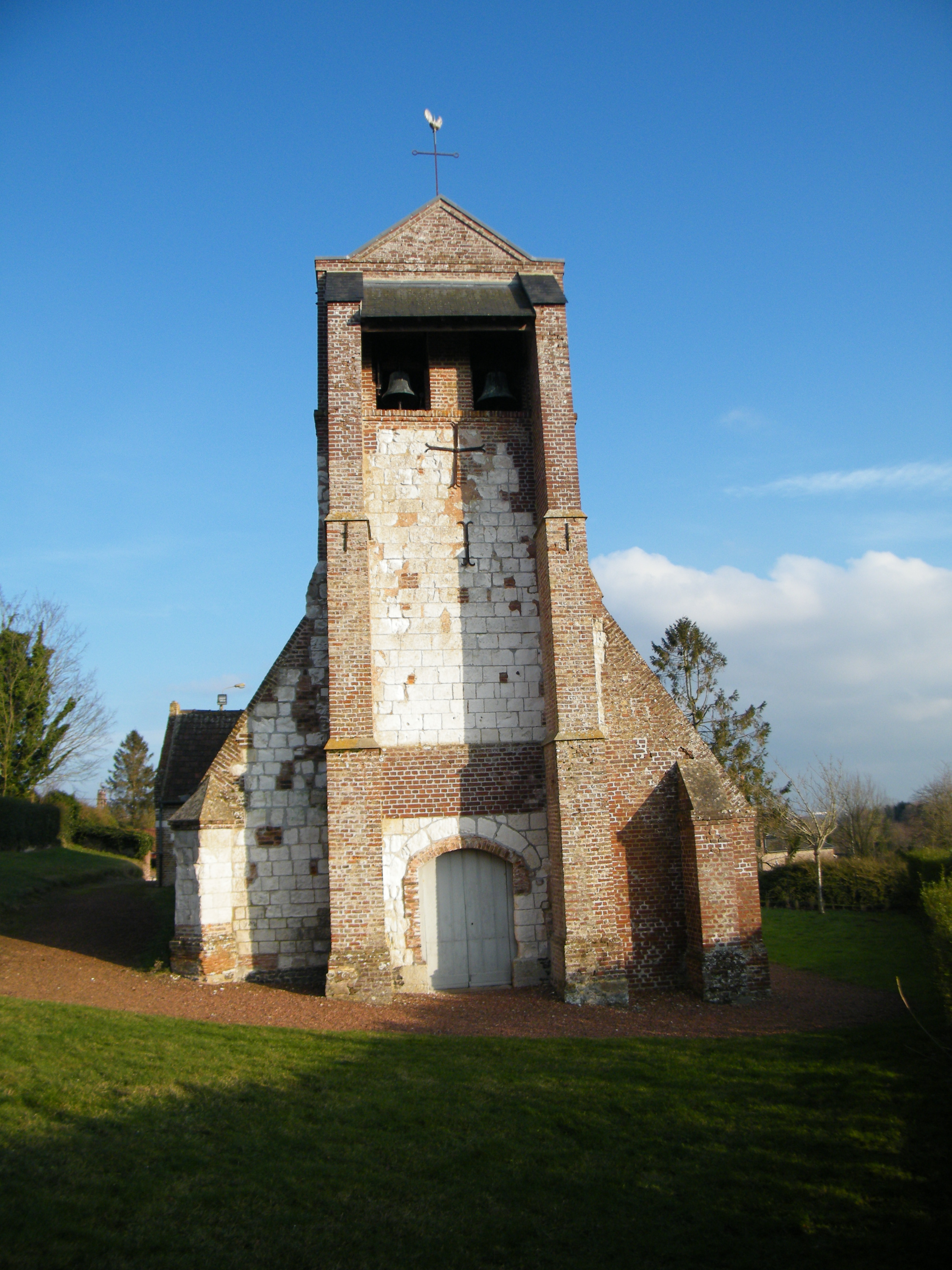
- Church tower
- Location of Grand-Laviers
- Location within France Location within Hauts-de-France
- Coordinates: 50°07′51″N 1°47′05″E
- Country: France
- Region: Hauts-de-France
- Department: Somme
- Arrondissement: Abbeville
- Canton: Abbeville-1
- Intercommunality: CA Baie de Somme

Government
  - Mayor (2020–2026): Christophe Mennesson
- Area^{1}: 9.5 km^{2} (3.7 sq mi)
- Elevation: 7 m (23 ft)
- Highest elevation: 67 m (220 ft)
- Lowest elevation: 2 m (6.6 ft)
- Population (2023): 465
  - Density: 49/km^{2} (130/sq mi)
- Time zone: UTC+01:00 (CET)
  - Summer (DST): UTC+02:00 (CEST)
- INSEE/Postal code: 80385 /80132
- ^{1} French Land Register data, which excludes lakes, ponds, glaciers > 1 km^{2} (0.386 sq mi or 247 acres) and river estuaries.

Grand-Laviers (French pronunciation: [ɡʁɑ̃ lavje]; Picard: Grand-Lavier) is a commune in the Somme department in Hauts-de-France in northern France.

== Geography ==
The commune is situated on the D40 road, some 3 miles (5 km) northwest of Abbeville, by the banks of the canalised river Somme. The ancient forests of Abbeville remain as woods on the hills to the west of the village.

== History ==
The Latin names Latverum or Laverum appear in the year 881 in the records of the Abbey of St. Vaast at Amiens. Controversy surrounds the meaning of the name: "lavoir", according to some, or "arm of a river", according to others. In 883, when the Normans sacked the abbey at Saint-Quentin, the king Carloman II of France, set up his camp at Laviers to block their passage to the sea.

In the 11th century, a fort comprising a palisade on a motte was built at Laviers, near the Bois de Bonance, on a point jutting out towards the bay. In 1137, Abbeville’s charter, granted by the Comte de Ponthieu, mentioned "Laveriœ".

In 1177, Jean de Ponthieu gave money to the leper hospital of the frères du Val and the gift of a forest was noted. The clearing of an area of the forest now known as the "Valley of the Lepers", between Laviers and Buigny-Saint-Maclou may have started up as early as 1164. In 1696, the leper hospital was closed down.

In 1777, after a branch of the Somme was blocked at Saint-Valery-sur-Somme, the authorities decided to build a canal from Abbeville to the estuary at Saint Valery. Work began in 1786 but hit problems in 1793 with the installation of the sluice-gates in the muddy sub-strata and above all, the reaction of the local farmers, raising sheep and cattle on the salt-marshes. Work resumed under the orders of Napoleon Bonaparte in 1802, who wanted Saint-Valéry-sur-Somme as a war-port. In 1810, Spanish prisoners worked on the terracing and the maritime canal was inaugurated in 1827. In 1840, Laviers took the name of Grand-Laviers and from 1845 to 1850, the railway line from Abbeville to Étaples was built, a section of the Paris – Boulogne line. The river bed of the Somme was filled and moved to accommodate the construction.

The town was comparatively safe during the First World War, accommodating Indian colonial assistants.

In May 1940, during the Second World War, the town was separated from Abbeville. It was liberated by English troops in August 1944.

In 1953, a primary school was constructed at Grand-Laviers, and the following year, the pupils of the school inherited a castle from the Jusancourt family that now houses an educational medical institute.

On 2 May 1976 the commune of Petit-Laviers was amalgamated with Grand-Laviers.

== Population ==
Historical population
| Year | Pop. | ±% p.a. |
|---|---|---|
| 1968 | 356 | — |
| 1975 | 351 | −0.20% |
| 1982 | 395 | +1.70% |
| 1990 | 423 | +0.86% |
| 1999 | 372 | −1.42% |
| 2007 | 344 | −0.97% |
| 2012 | 343 | −0.06% |
| 2017 | 433 | +4.77% |
| 2023 | 465 | +1.20% |
Source: INSEE

== Places of interest ==
- Bonance woods.
- Fifteenth century church
- The ruins of a 13th-century chapel which belonged to an old friary hospital.
- An ornithological reserve of 100 acres (40 ha) located on a nearby rehabilitated industrial site.

== See also ==
- Communes of the Somme department
