= Agenvillers =

Commune in Hauts-de-France, France

- Commune
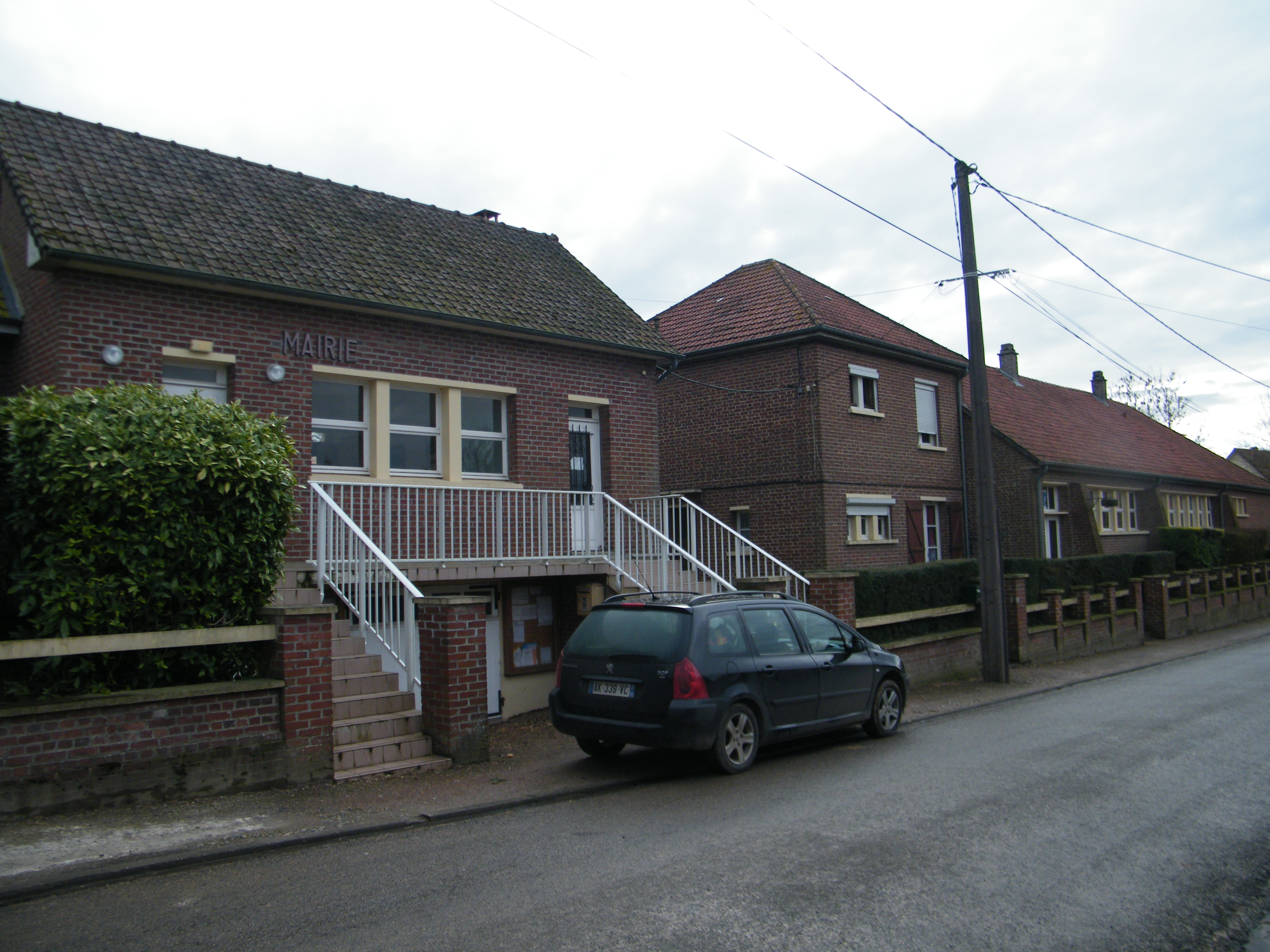
- The town hall and school of Agenvillers
- Location of Agenvillers
- Location within France Location within Hauts-de-France
- Coordinates: 50°10′45″N 1°55′13″E
- Country: France
- Region: Hauts-de-France
- Department: Somme
- Arrondissement: Abbeville
- Canton: Abbeville-1
- Intercommunality: Ponthieu-Marquenterre

Government
  - Mayor (2020–2026): Pascal Farcy
- Area^{1}: 5.98 km^{2} (2.31 sq mi)
- Elevation: 84 m (276 ft)
- Highest elevation: 85 m (279 ft)
- Lowest elevation: 58 m (190 ft)
- Population (2023): 215
  - Density: 36.0/km^{2} (93.1/sq mi)
- Time zone: UTC+01:00 (CET)
  - Summer (DST): UTC+02:00 (CEST)
- INSEE/Postal code: 80006 /80150
- ^{1} French Land Register data, which excludes lakes, ponds, glaciers > 1 km^{2} (0.386 sq mi or 247 acres) and river estuaries.

Agenvillers (Picard: Ginvilé) is a commune in the Somme department in Hauts-de-France in northern France.

== Geography ==
The communes is a small village about 13 km (8 mi) northeast of Abbeville, on the D82 departmental road.

== Population ==
Historical population
Year	Pop.	±% p.a.
1968	224	—
1975	206	−1.19%
1982	205	−0.07%
1990	198	−0.43%
1999	181	−0.99%
2007	192	+0.74%
2012	195	+0.31%
2017	228	+3.18%
2023	215	−0.97%
Source: INSEE

== See also ==
Communes of the Somme department
