= Hautvillers-Ouville =

- Commune
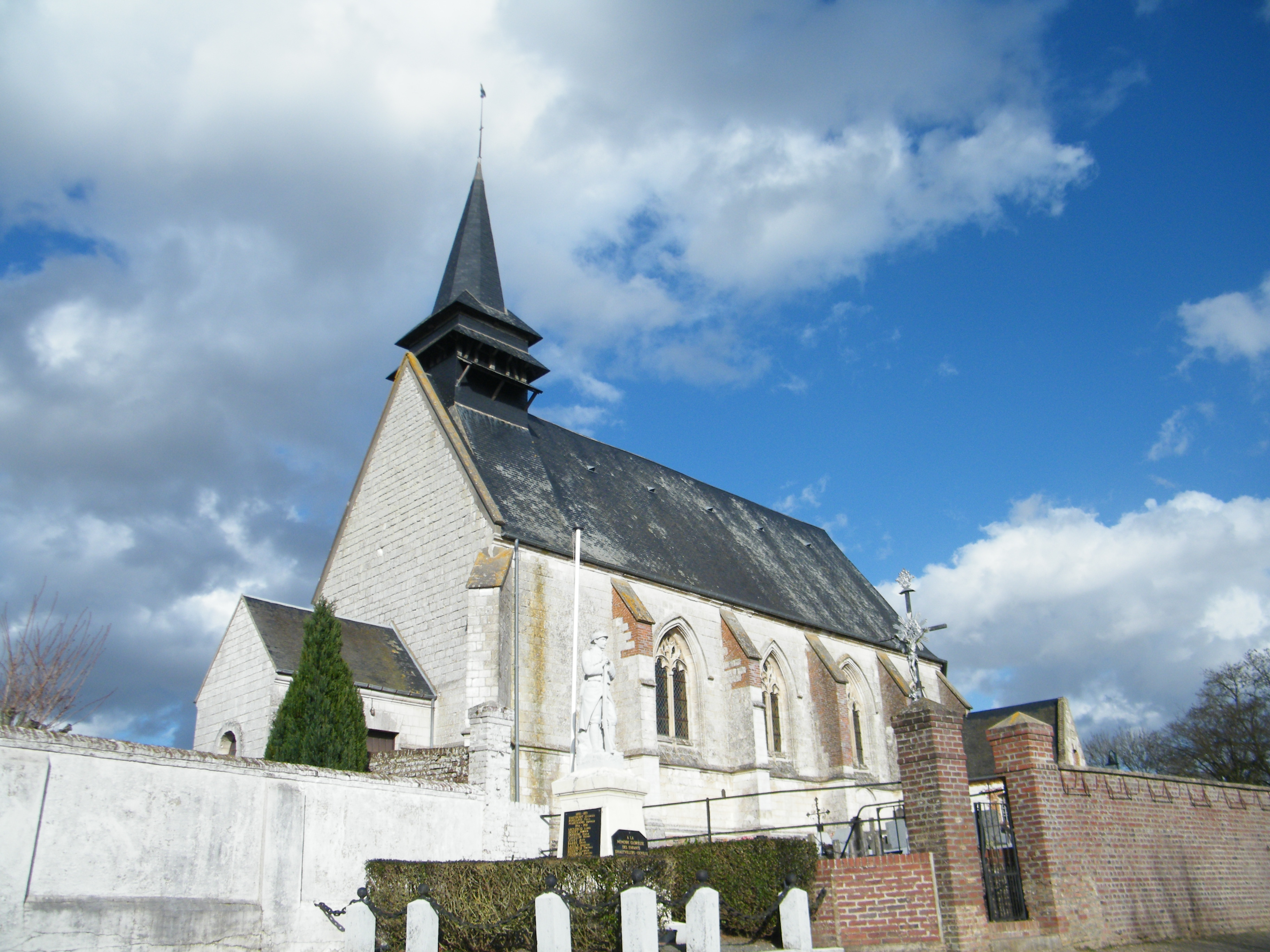
- Church
- Location of Hautvillers-Ouville
- Location within France Location within Hauts-de-France
- Coordinates: 50°10′24″N 1°48′57″E
- Country: France
- Region: Hauts-de-France
- Department: Somme
- Arrondissement: Abbeville
- Canton: Abbeville-1
- Intercommunality: CC Ponthieu-Marquenterre

Government
  - Mayor (2020–2026): Frédéric Noël
- Area^{1}: 6.06 km^{2} (2.34 sq mi)
- Elevation: 59 m (194 ft)
- Highest elevation: 68 m (223 ft)
- Lowest elevation: 44 m (144 ft)
- Population (2023): 527
  - Density: 87.0/km^{2} (225/sq mi)
- Time zone: UTC+01:00 (CET)
  - Summer (DST): UTC+02:00 (CEST)
- INSEE/Postal code: 80422 /80132
- ^{1} French Land Register data, which excludes lakes, ponds, glaciers > 1 km^{2} (0.386 sq mi or 247 acres) and river estuaries.

Hautvillers-Ouville is a commune in the Somme department in Hauts-de-France in northern France.

== Geography ==
The commune is situated on the N1 road, 8 kilometres (5 mi) north of Abbeville.

== Population ==
Historical population
Year	Pop.	±% p.a.
1968	346	—
1975	383	+1.46%
1982	396	+0.48%
1990	401	+0.16%
1999	378	−0.65%
2007	435	+1.77%
2012	584	+6.07%
2017	580	−0.14%
2023	527	−1.58%
Source: INSEE

== See also ==
- Communes of the Somme department
