= Neuilly-l'Hôpital =

- Commune
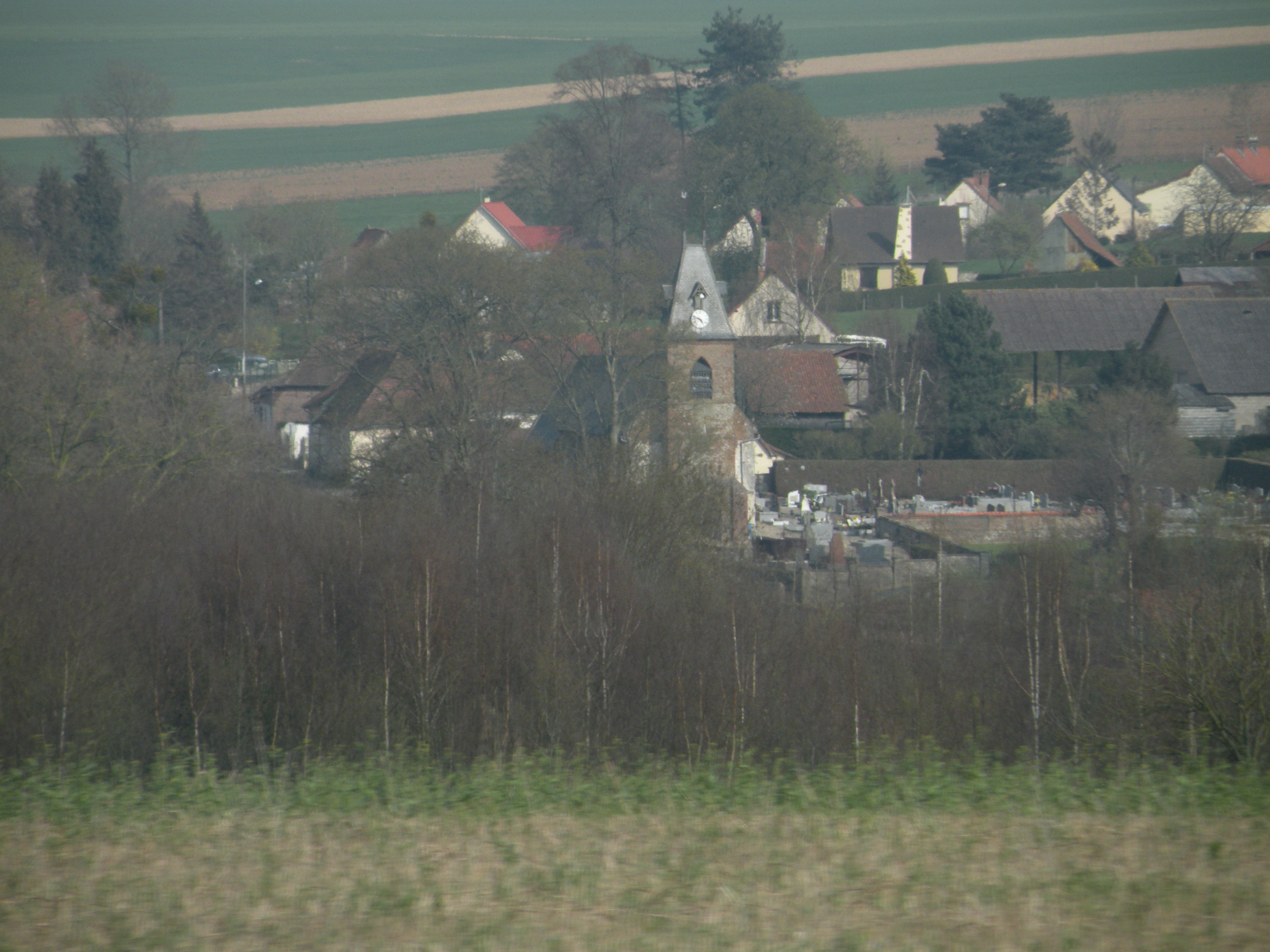
- The church in Neuilly-l'Hôpital

- Coat of arms
- Location of Neuilly-l'Hôpital
- Location within France Location within Hauts-de-France
- Coordinates: 50°10′10″N 1°52′42″E
- Country: France
- Region: Hauts-de-France
- Department: Somme
- Arrondissement: Abbeville
- Canton: Abbeville-1
- Intercommunality: CC Ponthieu-Marquenterre

Government
  - Mayor (2020–2026): José Conty
- Area^{1}: 7.69 km^{2} (2.97 sq mi)
- Elevation: 32 m (105 ft)
- Highest elevation: 84 m (276 ft)
- Lowest elevation: 22 m (72 ft)
- Population (2023): 334
  - Density: 43.4/km^{2} (112/sq mi)
- Time zone: UTC+01:00 (CET)
  - Summer (DST): UTC+02:00 (CEST)
- INSEE/Postal code: 80590 /80132
- ^{1} French Land Register data, which excludes lakes, ponds, glaciers > 1 km^{2} (0.386 sq mi or 247 acres) and river estuaries.

Neuilly-l'Hôpital (French pronunciation: [nœji lopital]) is a commune in the Somme department in Hauts-de-France in northern France.

== Geography ==
The commune is situated on the D32 road, some 5 miles (8 km) northeast of Abbeville.

== Population ==
Historical population
Year	Pop.	±% p.a.
1968	259	—
1975	266	+0.38%
1982	260	−0.33%
1990	280	+0.93%
1999	290	+0.39%
2007	316	+1.08%
2012	321	+0.31%
2017	323	+0.12%
2023	334	+0.56%
Source: INSEE

== See also ==
- Communes of the Somme department
