= Gapennes =

- Commune
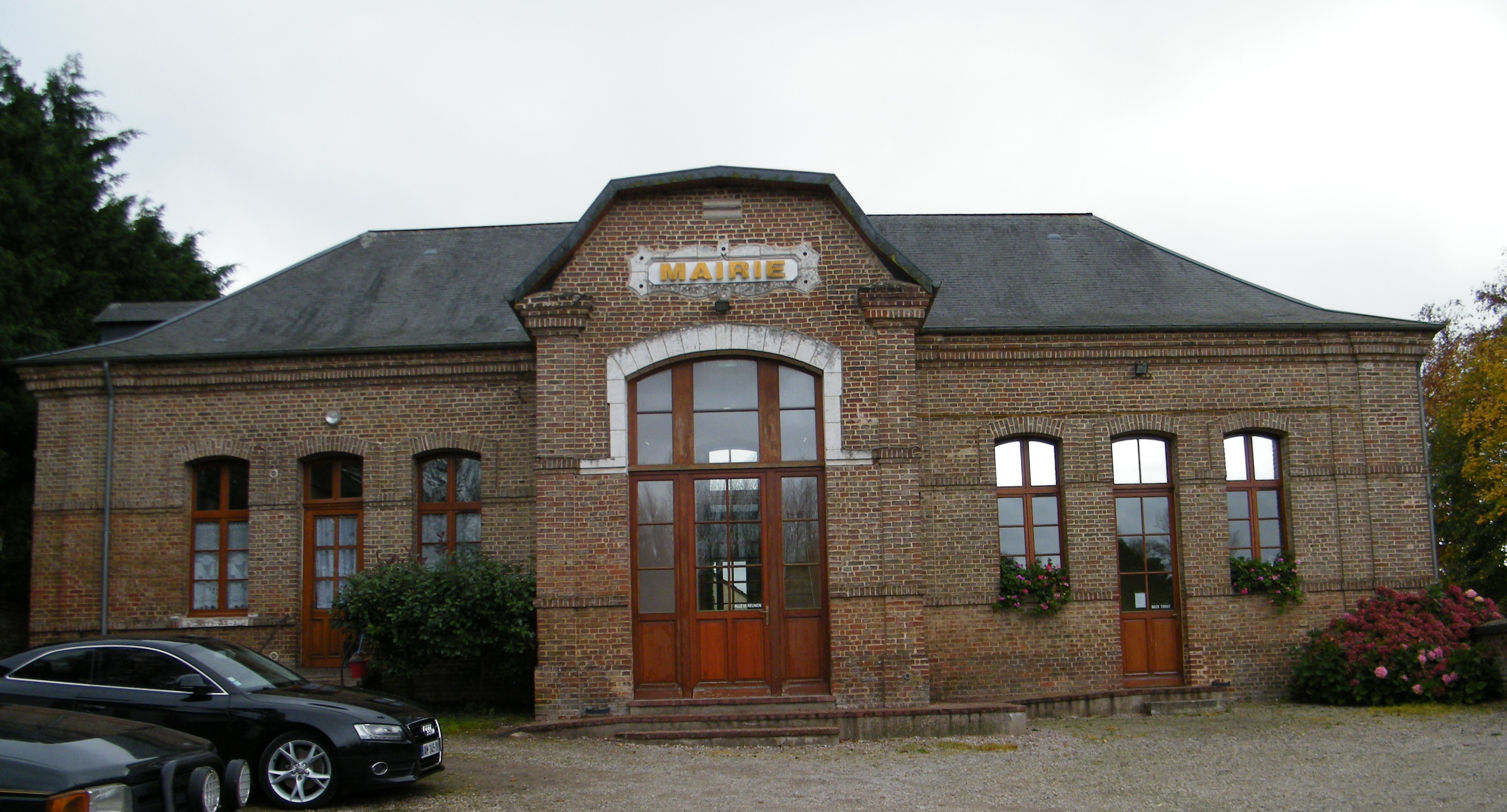
- The town hall in Gapennes

- Coat of arms
- Location of Gapennes
- Location within France Location within Hauts-de-France
- Coordinates: 50°11′02″N 1°57′13″E
- Country: France
- Region: Hauts-de-France
- Department: Somme
- Arrondissement: Abbeville
- Canton: Abbeville-1
- Intercommunality: CC Ponthieu-Marquenterre

Government
  - Mayor (2020–2026): Daniel Fouconnier
- Area^{1}: 11.37 km^{2} (4.39 sq mi)
- Elevation: 60 m (200 ft)
- Highest elevation: 102 m (335 ft)
- Lowest elevation: 44 m (144 ft)
- Population (2023): 270
  - Density: 24/km^{2} (62/sq mi)
- Time zone: UTC+01:00 (CET)
  - Summer (DST): UTC+02:00 (CEST)
- INSEE/Postal code: 80374 /80150
- ^{1} French Land Register data, which excludes lakes, ponds, glaciers > 1 km^{2} (0.386 sq mi or 247 acres) and river estuaries.

Gapennes (French pronunciation: [ɡapɛn]) is a commune in the Somme department in Hauts-de-France in northern France.

== Geography ==
Gapennes is situated on the D10e road, some 10 miles (16 km) northeast of Abbeville.

== Population ==
Historical population
Year	Pop.	±% p.a.
1968	282	—
1975	269	−0.67%
1982	240	−1.62%
1990	217	−1.25%
1999	218	+0.05%
2007	247	+1.57%
2012	253	+0.48%
2017	281	+2.12%
2023	270	−0.66%
Source: INSEE

== See also ==
- Communes of the Somme department
