= Port-le-Grand =

- Commune
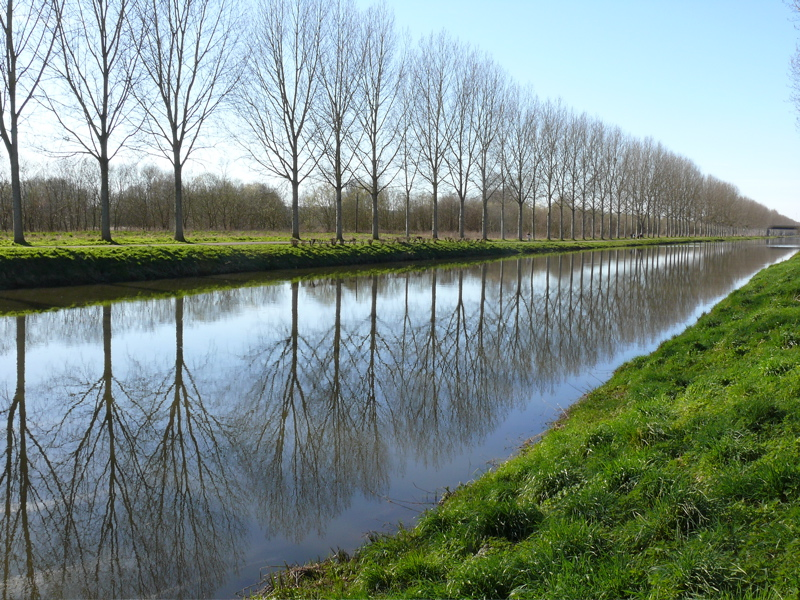
- The Somme Canal at Petit-Port
- Location of Port-le-Grand
- Location within France Location within Hauts-de-France
- Coordinates: 50°09′43″N 1°44′57″E
- Country: France
- Region: Hauts-de-France
- Department: Somme
- Arrondissement: Abbeville
- Canton: Abbeville-1
- Intercommunality: CC Ponthieu-Marquenterre

Government
  - Mayor (2020–2026): Jean-Jacques Jameas
- Area^{1}: 11.28 km^{2} (4.36 sq mi)
- Elevation: 7 m (23 ft)
- Highest elevation: 64 m (210 ft)
- Lowest elevation: 2 m (6.6 ft)
- Population (2023): 268
  - Density: 23.8/km^{2} (61.5/sq mi)
- Time zone: UTC+01:00 (CET)
  - Summer (DST): UTC+02:00 (CEST)
- INSEE/Postal code: 80637 /80132
- ^{1} French Land Register data, which excludes lakes, ponds, glaciers > 1 km^{2} (0.386 sq mi or 247 acres) and river estuaries.

Port-le-Grand is a commune in the Somme department in Hauts-de-France in northern France.

== Geography ==
Port-le-Grand is situated on the D40 road, some 5 miles (8 km) northwest of Abbeville.

== History ==
It is considered the birthplace of Saint Honorius of Amiens (d. 600 AD). From time immemorial it was the site of a ferry to cross the river. As Portus Icius it is mentioned in the vita of Saint Austreberthe, whose name is reflected in the small River Austreberthe.

== Population ==
Historical population
Year	Pop.	±% p.a.
1968	270	—
1975	275	+0.26%
1982	272	−0.16%
1990	332	+2.52%
1999	312	−0.69%
2007	300	−0.49%
2012	283	−1.16%
2017	283	+0.00%
2023	268	−0.90%
Source: INSEE

== See also ==
- Communes of the Somme department
