= Le Titre =

- Commune
- The town hall in Le Titre
- Location of Le Titre
- Location within France Location within Hauts-de-France
- Coordinates: 50°11′21″N 1°48′07″E
- Country: France
- Region: Hauts-de-France
- Department: Somme
- Arrondissement: Abbeville
- Canton: Abbeville-1
- Intercommunality: CC Ponthieu-Marquenterre

Government
  - Mayor (2020–2026): Pierre Delcourt
- Area^{1}: 4.51 km^{2} (1.74 sq mi)
- Elevation: 50 m (160 ft)
- Highest elevation: 53 m (174 ft)
- Lowest elevation: 33 m (108 ft)
- Population (2023): 332
  - Density: 73.6/km^{2} (191/sq mi)
- Time zone: UTC+01:00 (CET)
  - Summer (DST): UTC+02:00 (CEST)
- INSEE/Postal code: 80763 /80132
- ^{1} French Land Register data, which excludes lakes, ponds, glaciers > 1 km^{2} (0.386 sq mi or 247 acres) and river estuaries.

Le Titre (French pronunciation: [lə titʁ]; Picard: Él Tite) is a commune in the Somme department in Hauts-de-France in northern France.

== Geography ==
Le Titre is situated 5 miles (8 km) north of Abbeville, on the N1 road.

== Population ==
Historical population
Year	Pop.	±% p.a.
1968	288	—
1975	319	+1.47%
1982	324	+0.22%
1990	308	−0.63%
1999	289	−0.70%
2007	371	+3.17%
2012	385	+0.74%
2017	358	−1.44%
2023	332	−1.25%
Source: INSEE

== See also ==
- Communes of the Somme department
