= Sailly-Flibeaucourt =

- Commune
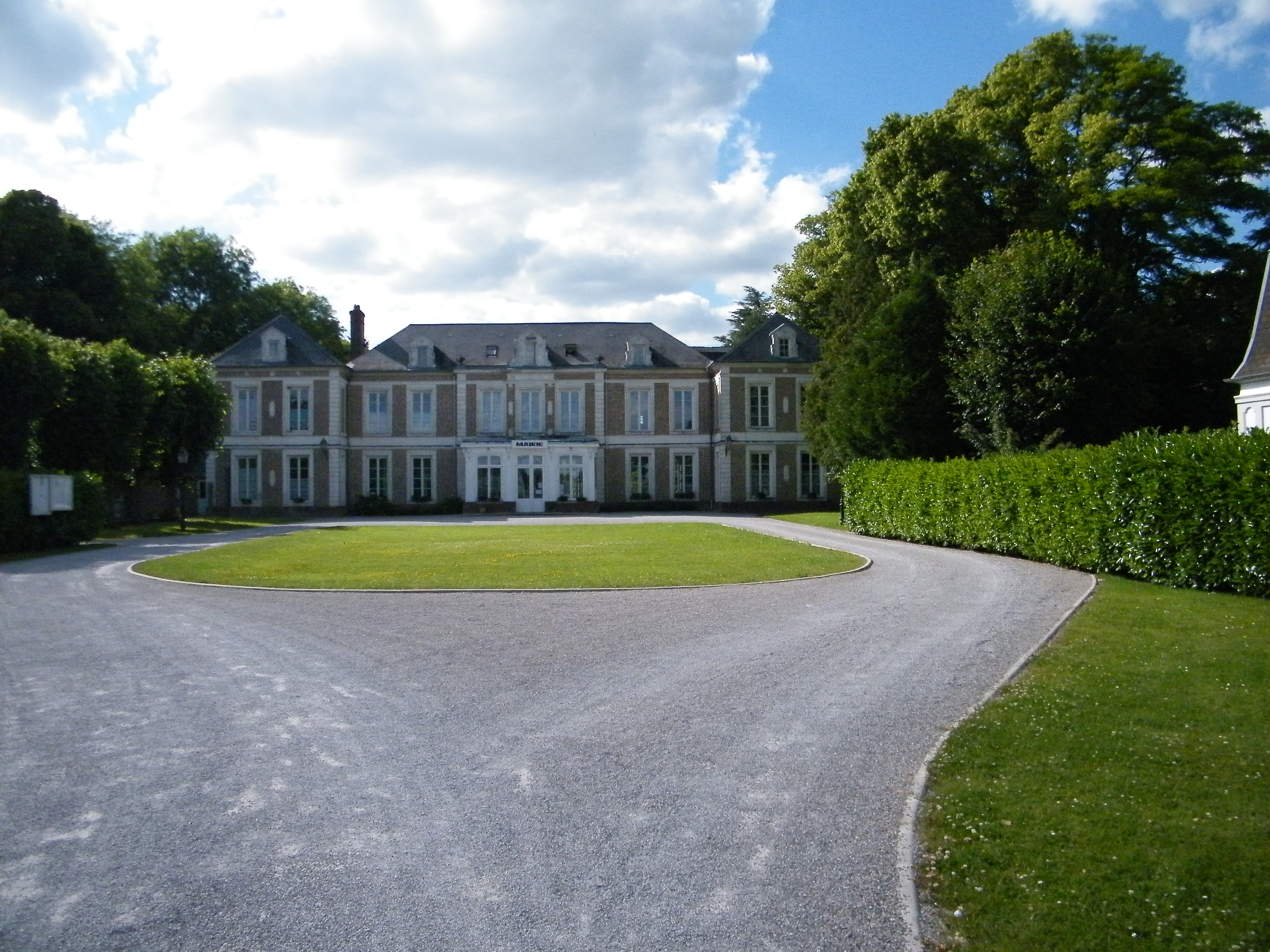
- Town-hall
- Location of Sailly-Flibeaucourt
- Location within France Location within Hauts-de-France
- Coordinates: 50°10′57″N 1°46′12″E
- Country: France
- Region: Hauts-de-France
- Department: Somme
- Arrondissement: Abbeville
- Canton: Abbeville-1
- Intercommunality: CC Ponthieu-Marquenterre

Government
  - Mayor (2020–2026): Paul Nester
- Area^{1}: 10.64 km^{2} (4.11 sq mi)
- Elevation: 45 m (148 ft)
- Highest elevation: 56 m (184 ft)
- Lowest elevation: 18 m (59 ft)
- Population (2023): 991
  - Density: 93.1/km^{2} (241/sq mi)
- Time zone: UTC+01:00 (CET)
  - Summer (DST): UTC+02:00 (CEST)
- INSEE/Postal code: 80692 /80970
- ^{1} French Land Register data, which excludes lakes, ponds, glaciers > 1 km^{2} (0.386 sq mi or 247 acres) and river estuaries.

Sailly-Flibeaucourt is a commune in the Somme department in Hauts-de-France in northern France.

== Geography ==
The commune is situated 5 miles (8 km) northwest of Abbeville, on the D111c road. The A16 autoroute is only half a mile away.

== Population ==
Historical population
Year	Pop.	±% p.a.
1968	986	—
1975	1,037	+0.72%
1982	1,006	−0.43%
1990	995	−0.14%
1999	947	−0.55%
2007	1,026	+1.01%
2012	1,018	−0.16%
2017	1,037	+0.37%
2023	991	−0.75%
Source: INSEE

== See also ==
- Communes of the Somme department
