= Forest-Montiers =

- Commune
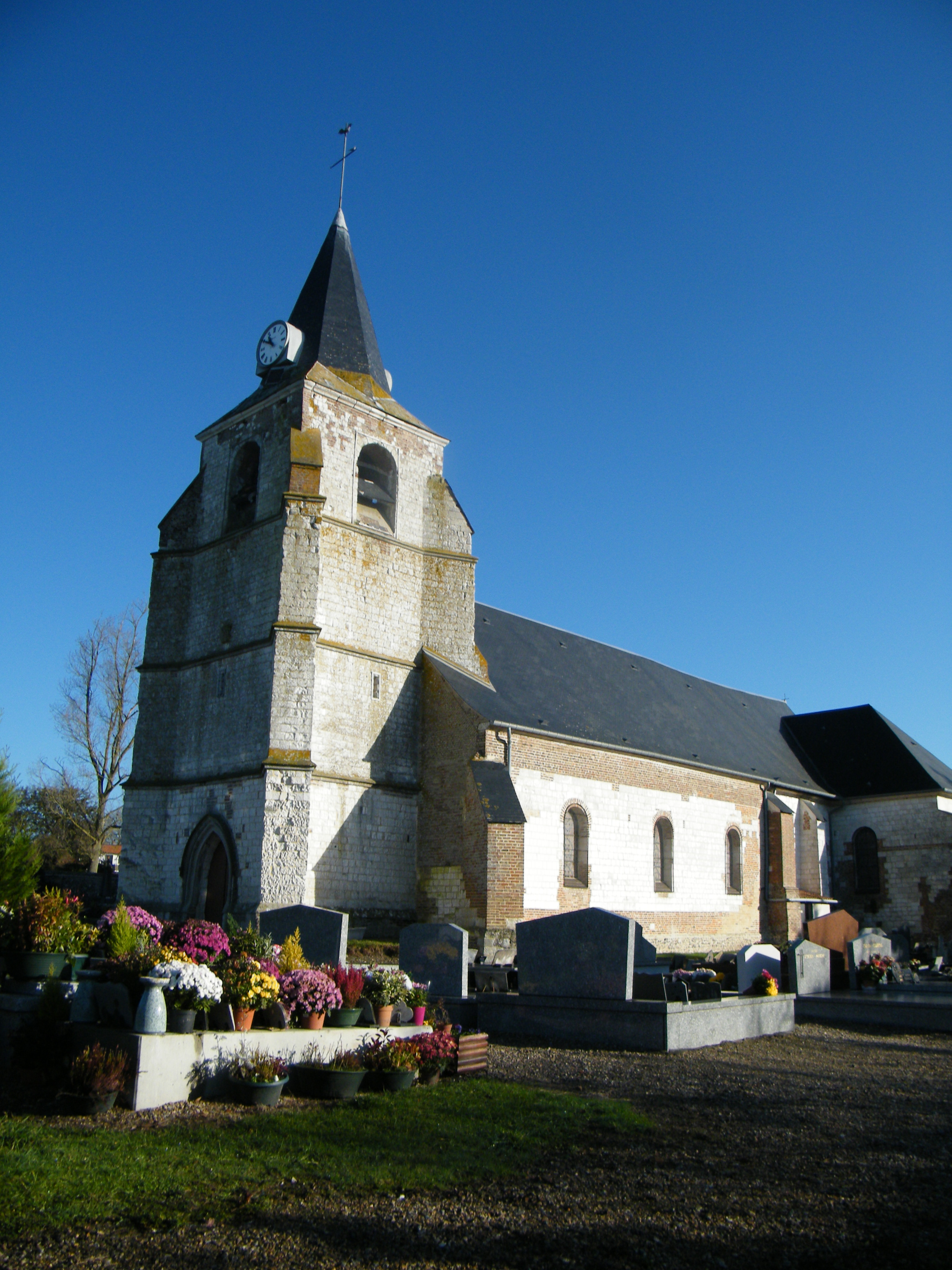
- Saint-Martin Church.

- Coat of arms
- Location of Forest-Montiers
- Location within France Location within Hauts-de-France
- Coordinates: 50°14′45″N 1°44′41″E
- Country: France
- Region: Hauts-de-France
- Department: Somme
- Arrondissement: Abbeville
- Canton: Abbeville-1
- Intercommunality: CC Ponthieu-Marquenterre

Government
  - Mayor (2020–2026): Jean-Luc Martin
- Area^{1}: 10.22 km^{2} (3.95 sq mi)
- Elevation: 22 m (72 ft)
- Highest elevation: 44 m (144 ft)
- Lowest elevation: 4 m (13 ft)
- Population (2023): 382
  - Density: 37.4/km^{2} (96.8/sq mi)
- Time zone: UTC+01:00 (CET)
  - Summer (DST): UTC+02:00 (CEST)
- INSEE/Postal code: 80332 /80120
- ^{1} French Land Register data, which excludes lakes, ponds, glaciers > 1 km^{2} (0.386 sq mi or 247 acres) and river estuaries.

Forest-Montiers (Picard: Frémontier) is a commune in the Somme department in Hauts-de-France in northern France.

== Geography ==
The commune is situated on the D32 road, near the N1/A16 autoroute junction, some 16 kilometres (10 mi) north of Abbeville.

== Population ==
Historical population

Year	Pop.	±% p.a.
1793	534	—
1856	694	+0.42%
1906	522	−0.57%
1962	379	−0.57%
1968	394	+0.65%
1975	372	−0.82%
1982	347	−0.99%

Year	Pop.	±% p.a.
1990	336	−0.40%
1999	374	+1.20%
2007	390	+0.53%
2012	420	+1.49%
2017	399	−1.02%
2023	382	−0.72%

Source: EHESS and INSEE (1968–2023)

== Places of interest ==
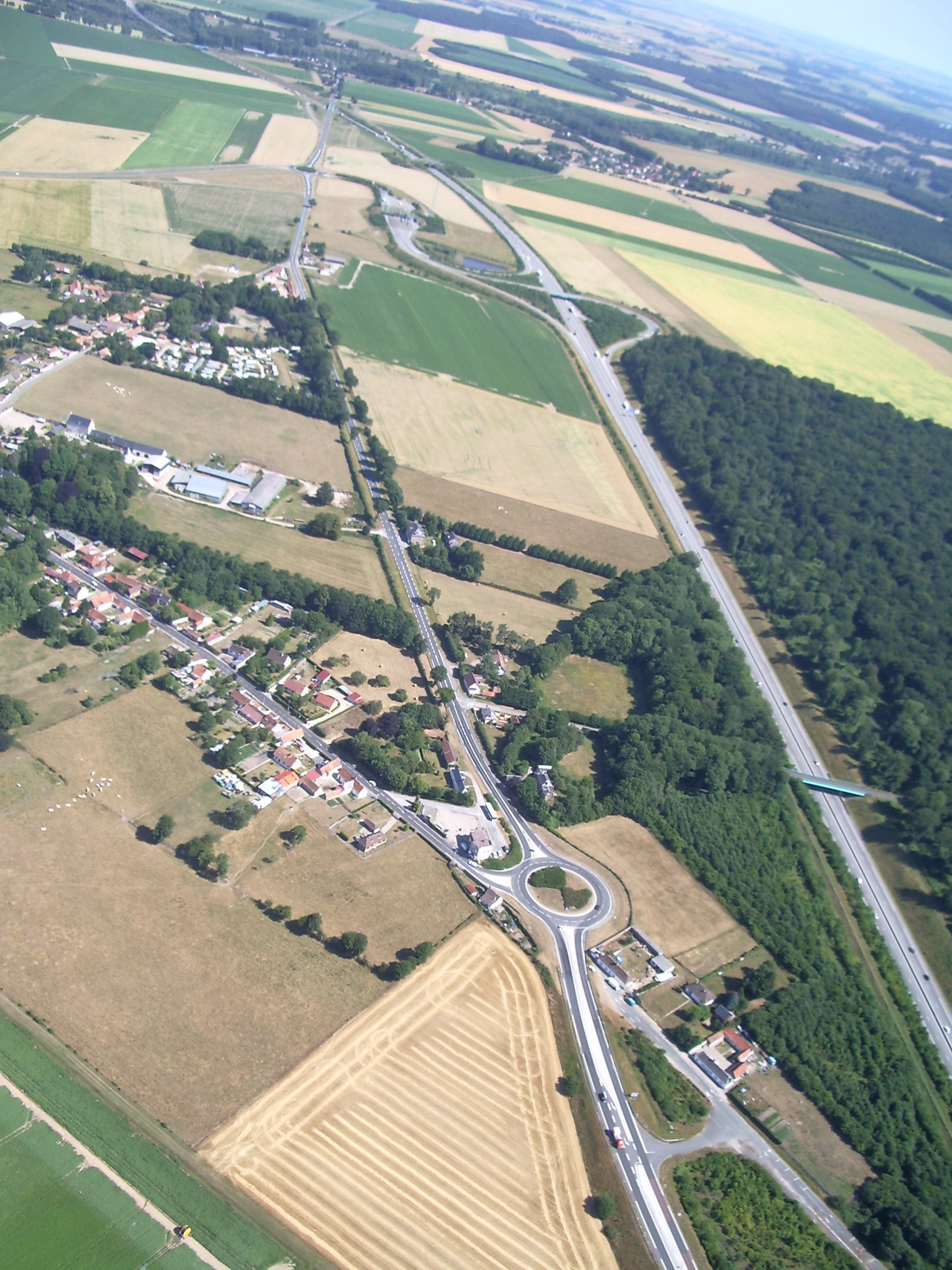
Aerial view.

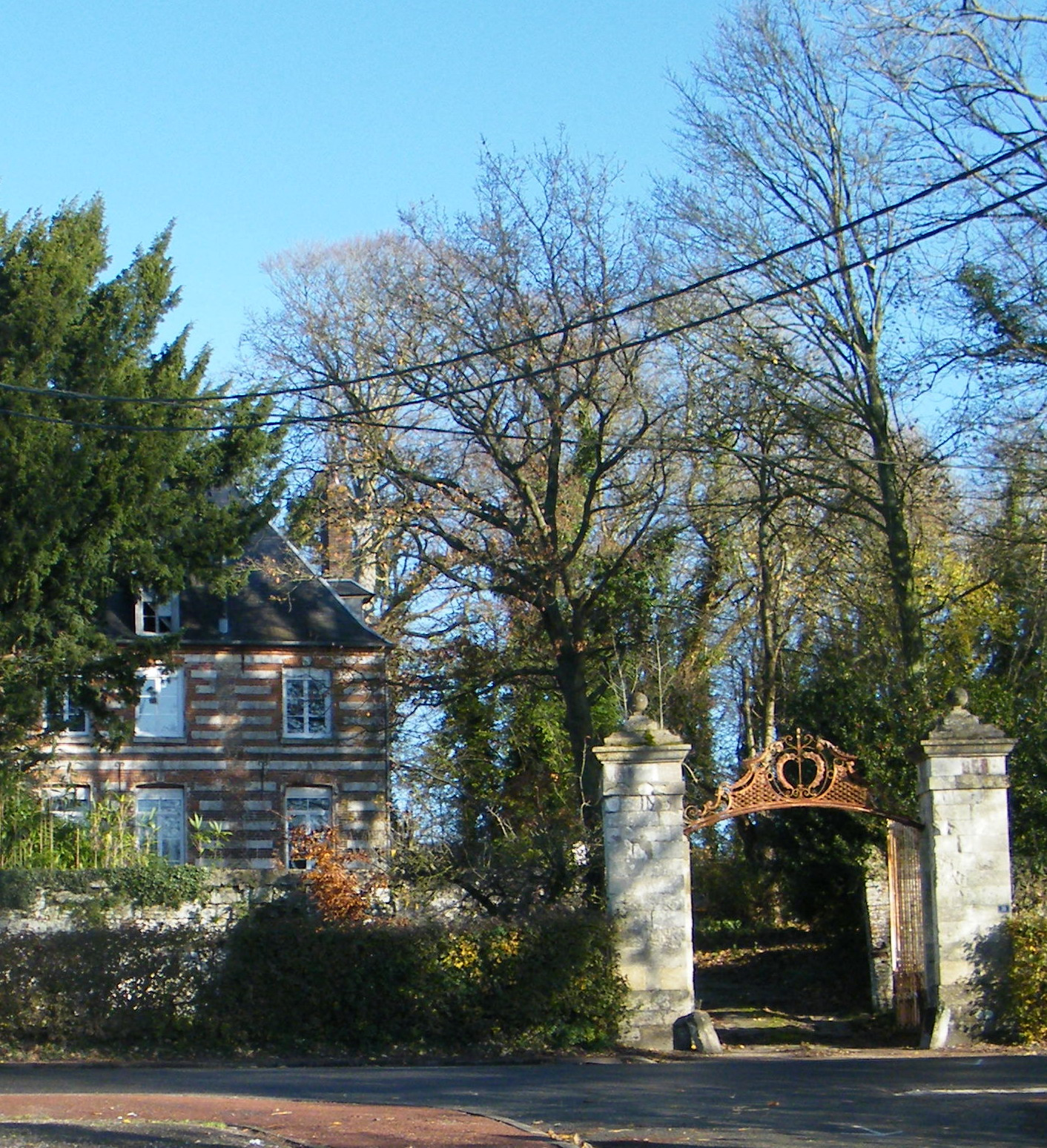
Saint-Riquier street.

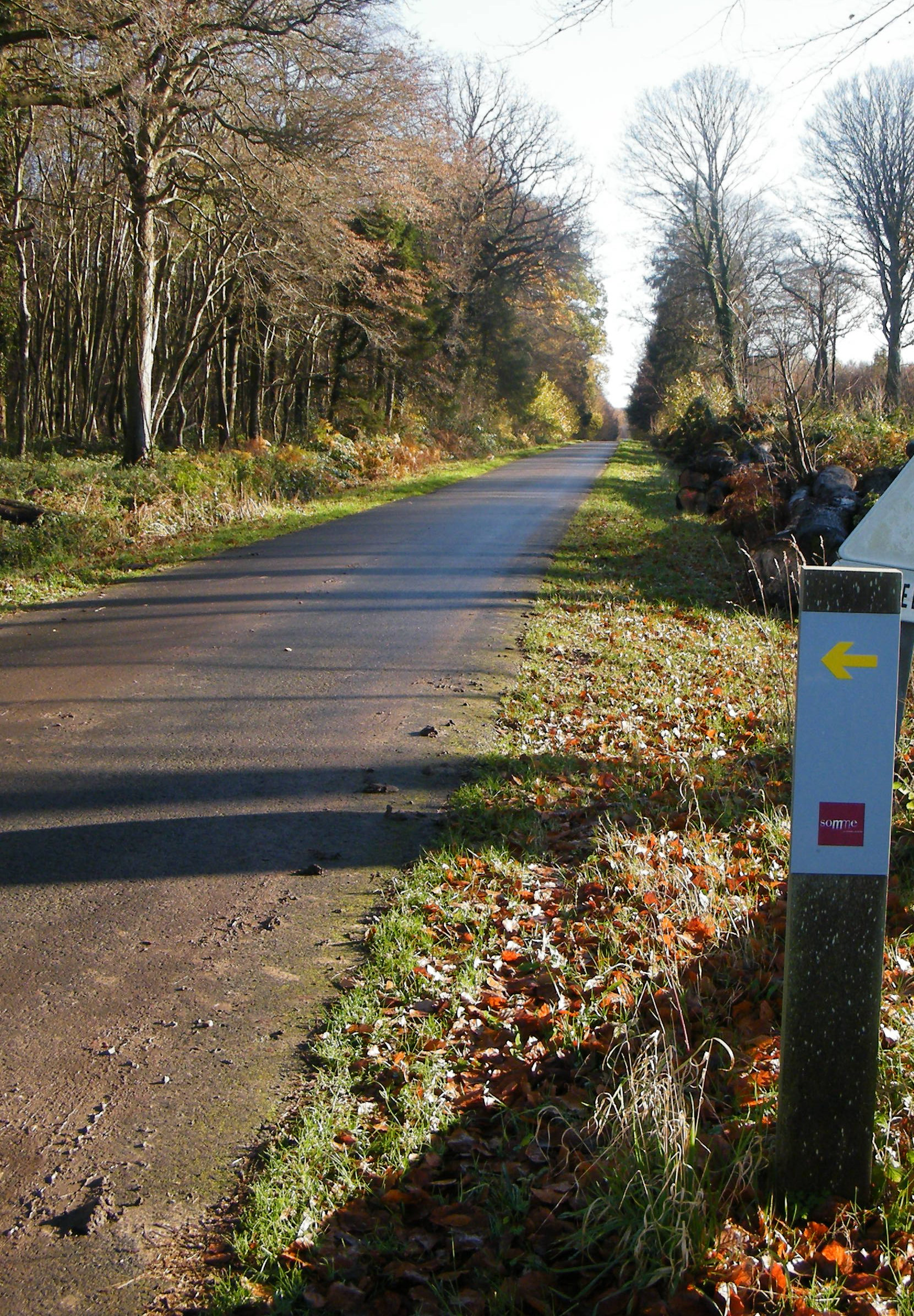
La forêt de Crécy.

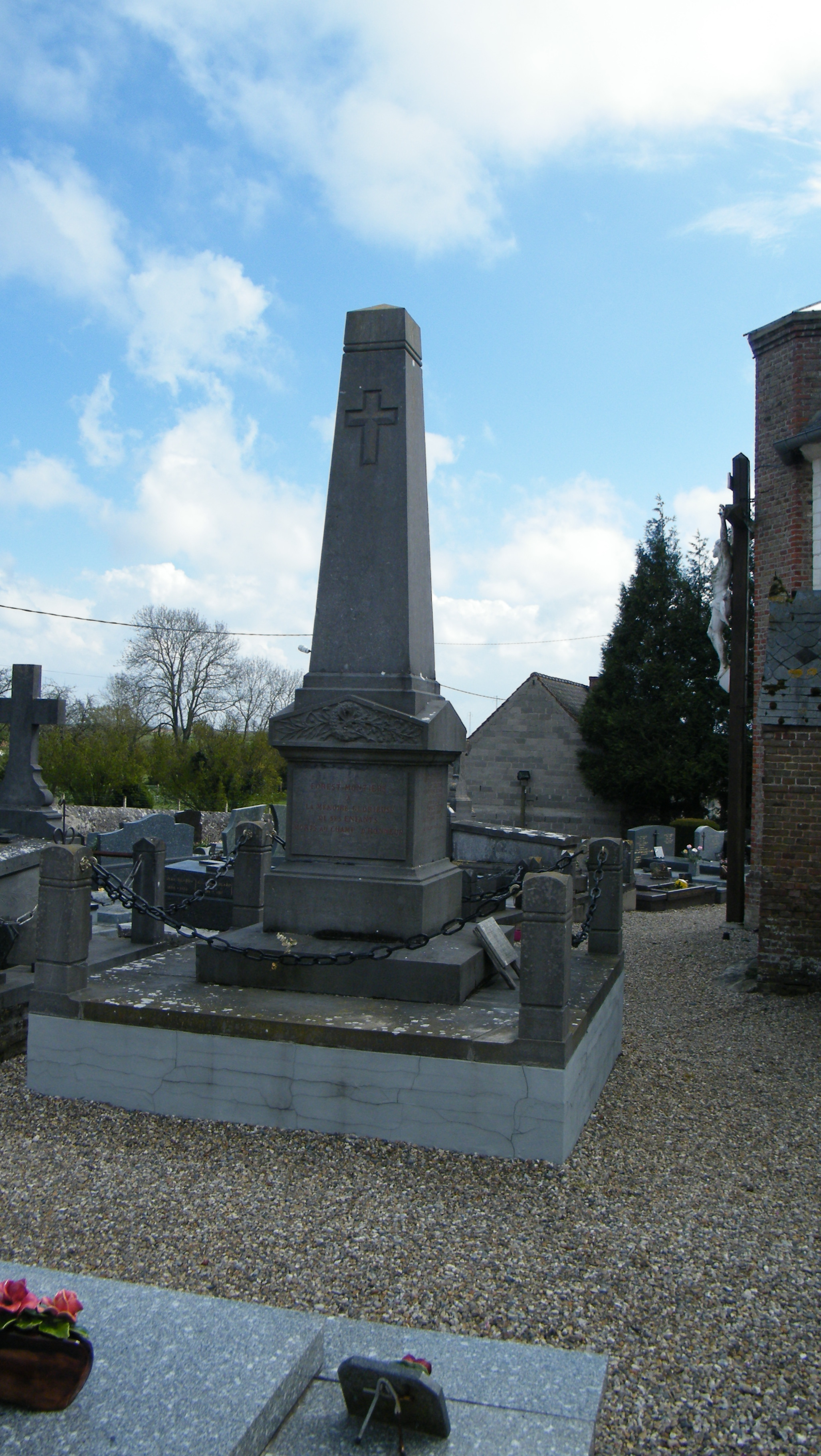
WW1 monument.

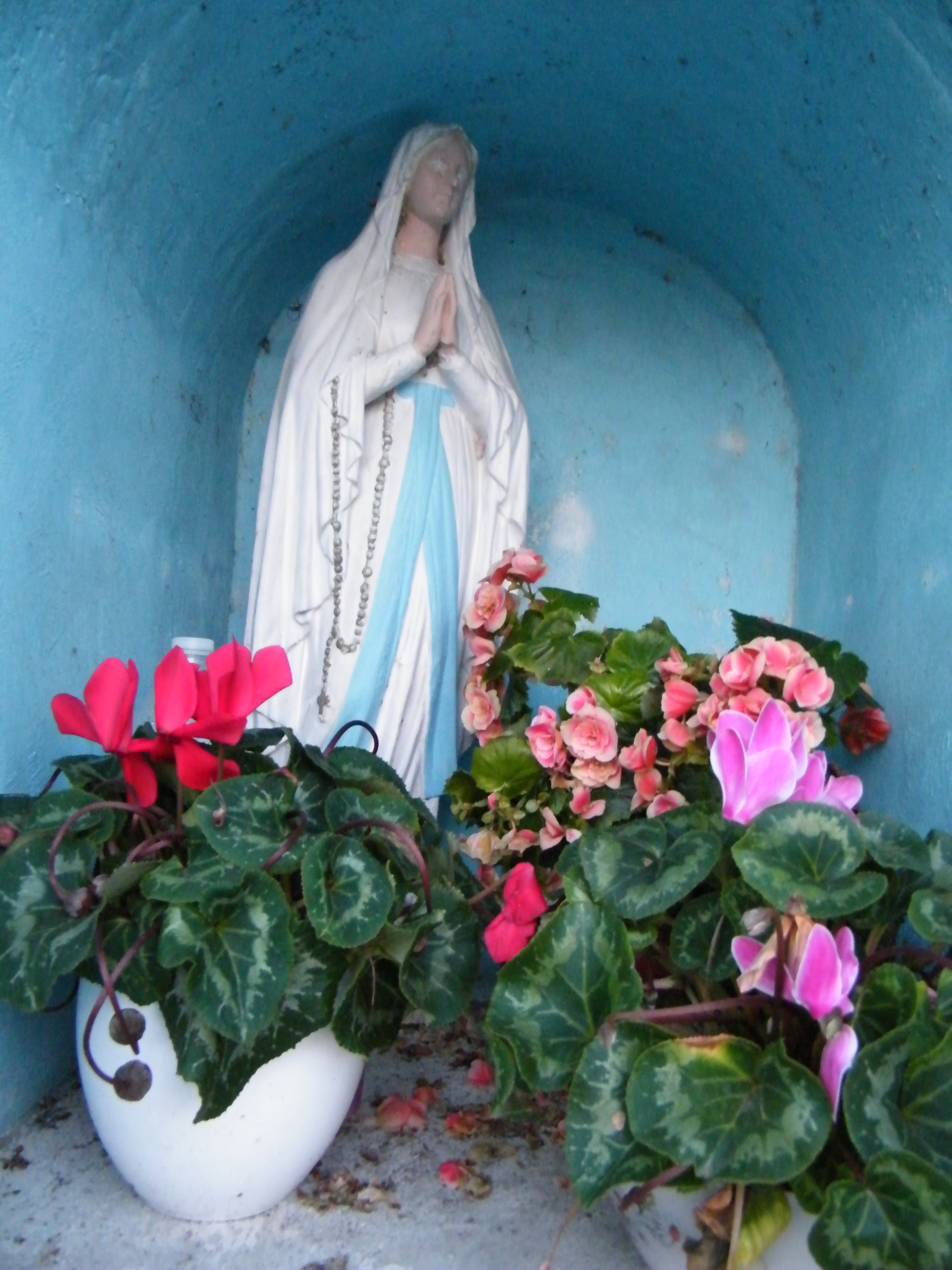
Notre-Dame des quatre chemins.

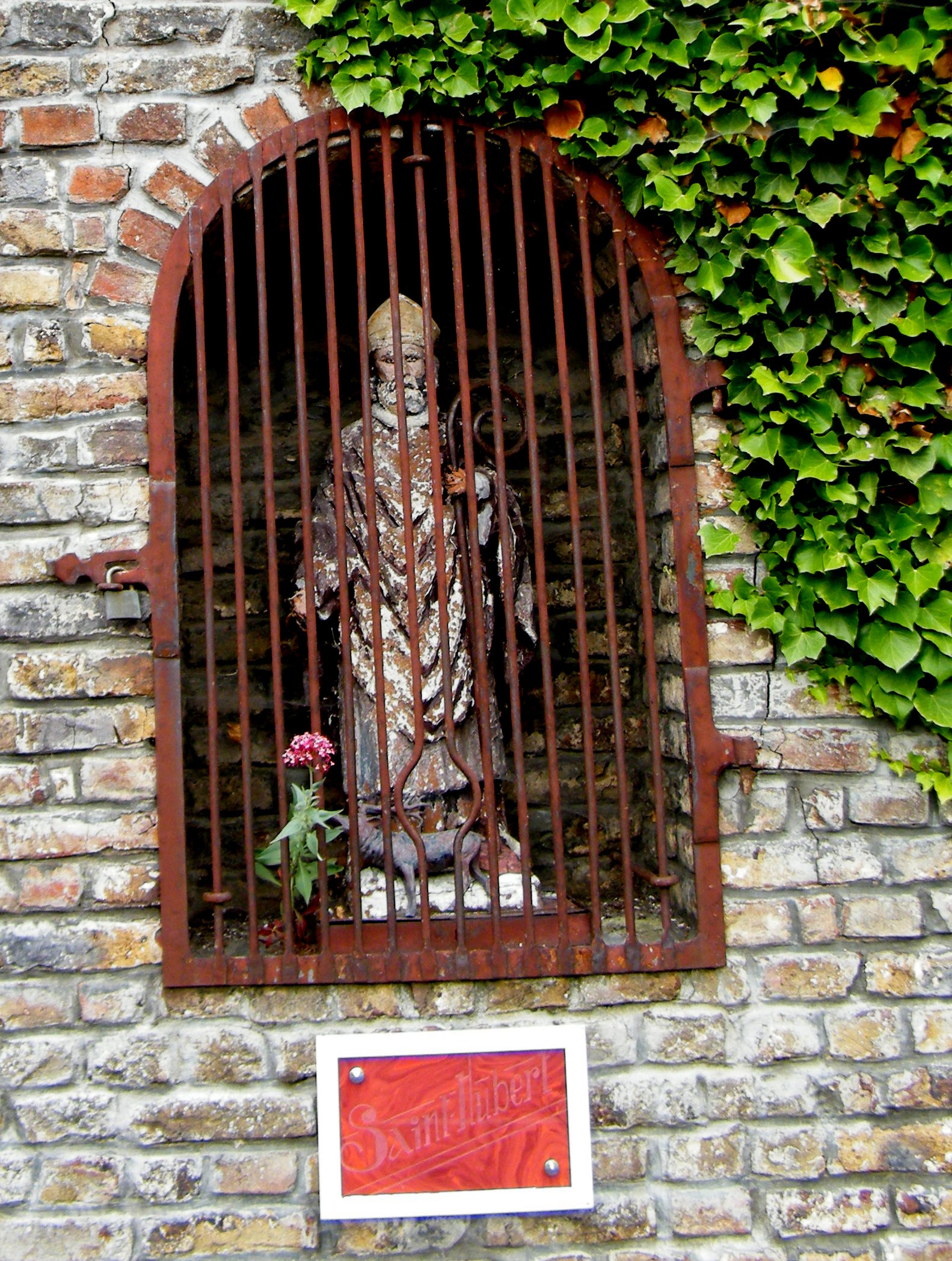
Saint Hubertus.

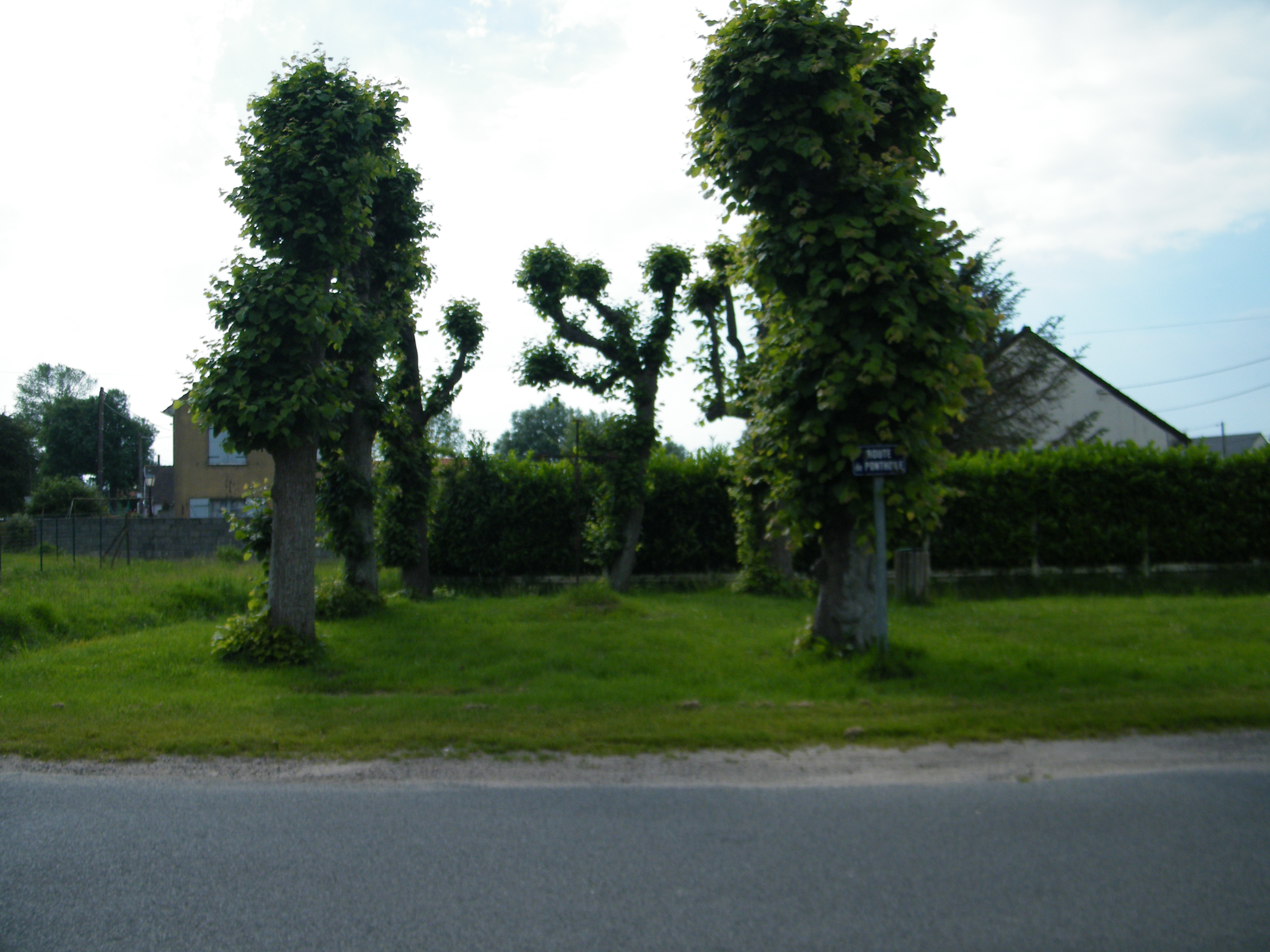
Cross in Neuville, rue de Ponthoile.

== See also ==
- Communes of the Somme department
