= Domvast =

- Commune
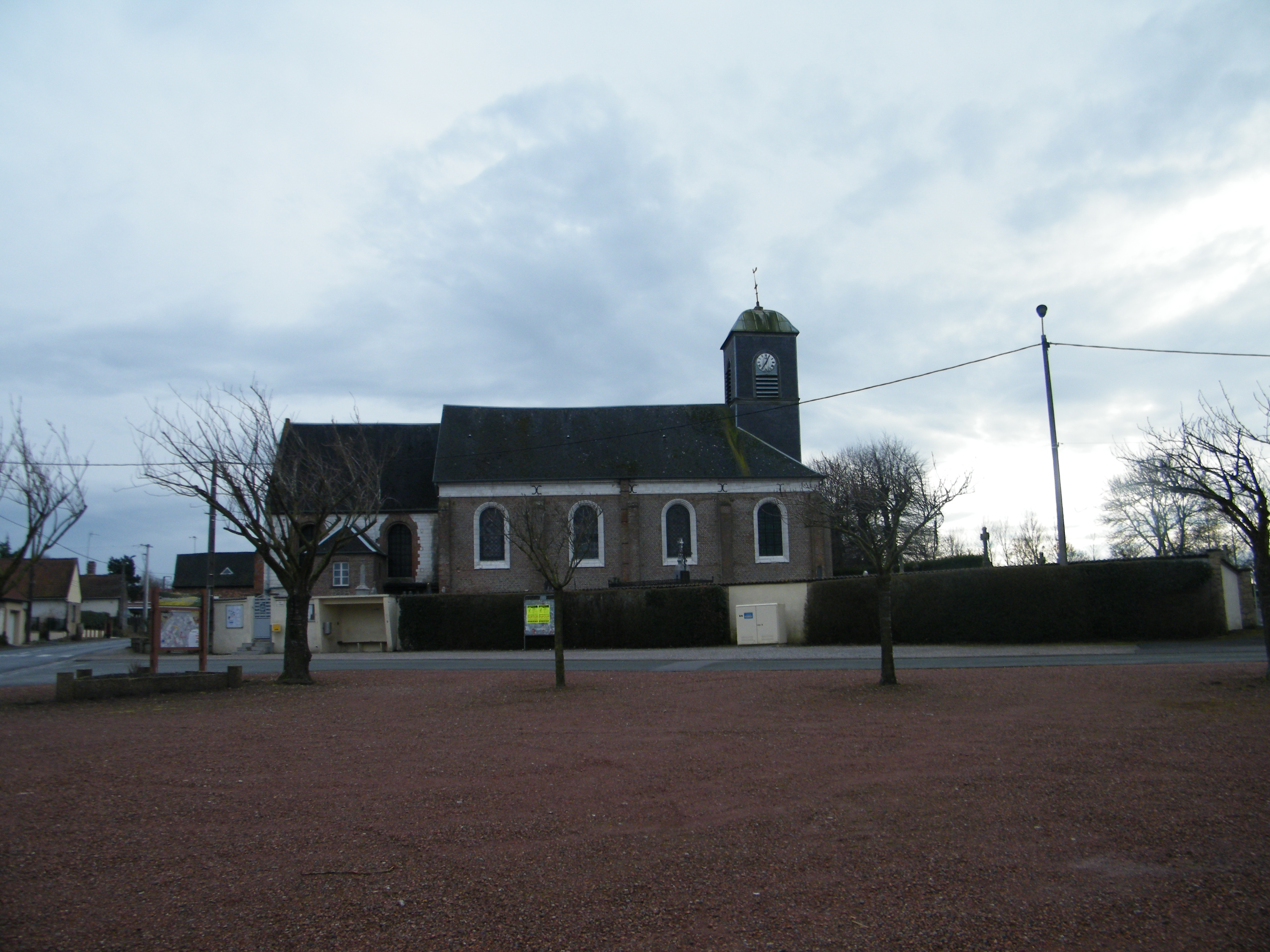
- Church in Domvast

- Coat of arms
- Location of Domvast
- Location within France Location within Hauts-de-France
- Coordinates: 50°11′50″N 1°55′19″E
- Country: France
- Region: Hauts-de-France
- Department: Somme
- Arrondissement: Abbeville
- Canton: Abbeville-1
- Intercommunality: CC Ponthieu-Marquenterre

Government
  - Mayor (2020–2026): Michel Gayet
- Area^{1}: 12.85 km^{2} (4.96 sq mi)
- Elevation: 80 m (260 ft)
- Highest elevation: 83 m (272 ft)
- Lowest elevation: 39 m (128 ft)
- Population (2023): 333
  - Density: 25.9/km^{2} (67.1/sq mi)
- Time zone: UTC+01:00 (CET)
  - Summer (DST): UTC+02:00 (CEST)
- INSEE/Postal code: 80250 /80150
- ^{1} French Land Register data, which excludes lakes, ponds, glaciers > 1 km^{2} (0.386 sq mi or 247 acres) and river estuaries.

Domvast (Picard: Donvo ) is a commune in the Somme department in Hauts-de-France in northern France.

== Geography ==
Domvast is situated on the D12 road, some 8 miles (13 km) northeast of Abbeville.

== Population ==
Historical population
Year	Pop.	±% p.a.
1968	255	—
1975	220	−2.09%
1982	213	−0.46%
1990	205	−0.48%
1999	212	+0.37%
2007	314	+5.03%
2012	344	+1.84%
2017	350	+0.35%
2023	333	−0.83%
Source: INSEE

== See also ==
- Communes of the Somme department
