= Millencourt-en-Ponthieu =

- Commune
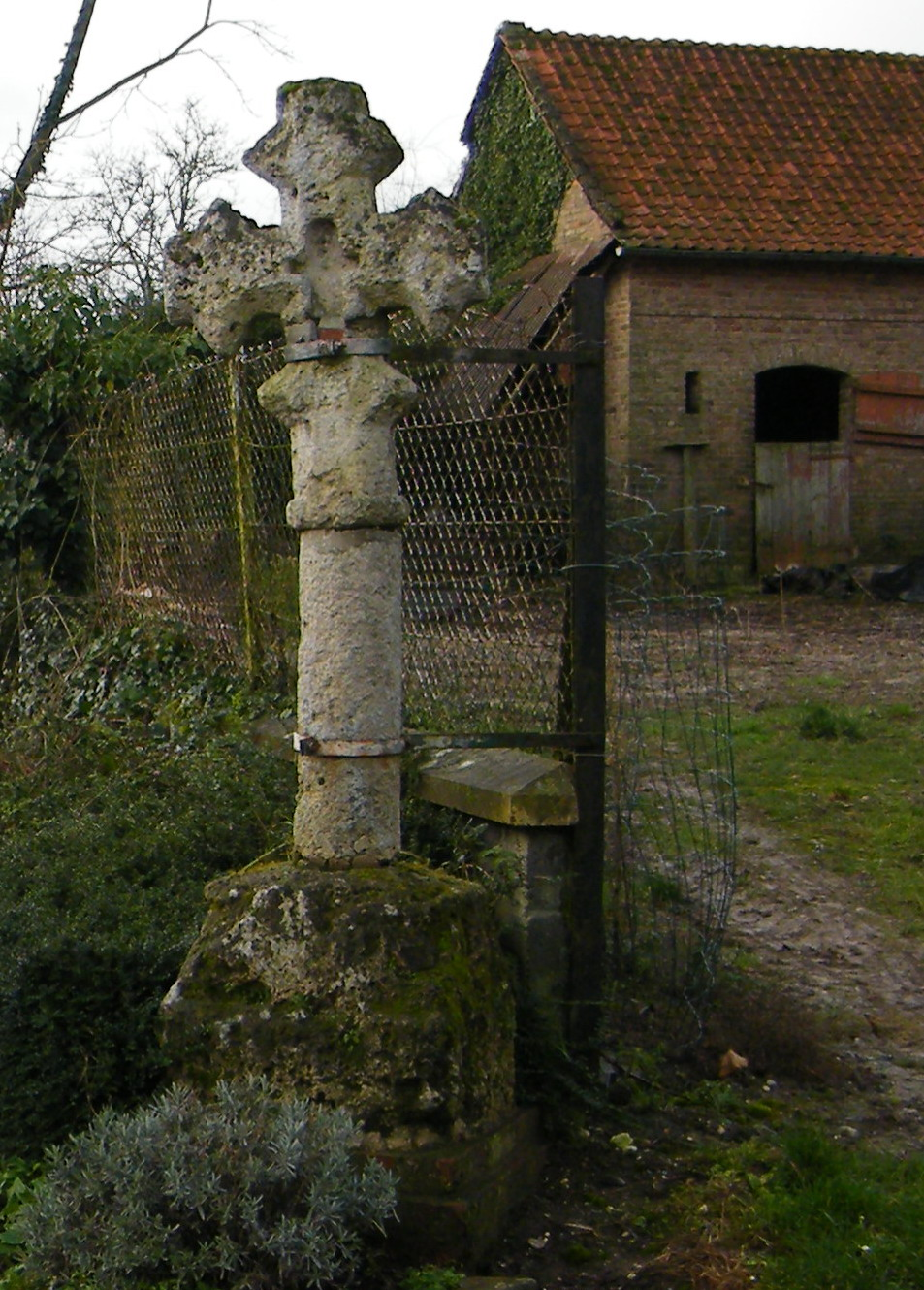
- The old cross in Millencourt-en-Ponthieu

- Coat of arms
- Location of Millencourt-en-Ponthieu
- Location within France Location within Hauts-de-France
- Coordinates: 50°09′09″N 1°54′09″E
- Country: France
- Region: Hauts-de-France
- Department: Somme
- Arrondissement: Abbeville
- Canton: Abbeville-1
- Intercommunality: CC Ponthieu-Marquenterre

Government
  - Mayor (2020–2026): Gérard Gallet
- Area^{1}: 8.62 km^{2} (3.33 sq mi)
- Elevation: 60 m (200 ft)
- Highest elevation: 87 m (285 ft)
- Lowest elevation: 14 m (46 ft)
- Population (2023): 337
  - Density: 39.1/km^{2} (101/sq mi)
- Time zone: UTC+01:00 (CET)
  - Summer (DST): UTC+02:00 (CEST)
- INSEE/Postal code: 80548 /80135
- ^{1} French Land Register data, which excludes lakes, ponds, glaciers > 1 km^{2} (0.386 sq mi or 247 acres) and river estuaries.

Millencourt-en-Ponthieu is a commune in the Somme department in Hauts-de-France in northern France.

== Geography ==
The commune is situated on the D82 road, some 5 miles (8 km) northeast of Abbeville.

== Population ==
Historical population
Year	Pop.	±% p.a.
1968	260	—
1975	241	−1.08%
1982	309	+3.61%
1990	355	+1.75%
1999	328	−0.88%
2007	347	+0.71%
2012	372	+1.40%
2017	359	−0.71%
2023	337	−1.05%
Source: INSEE

== See also ==
- Communes of the Somme department
