= Lamotte-Buleux =

- Commune
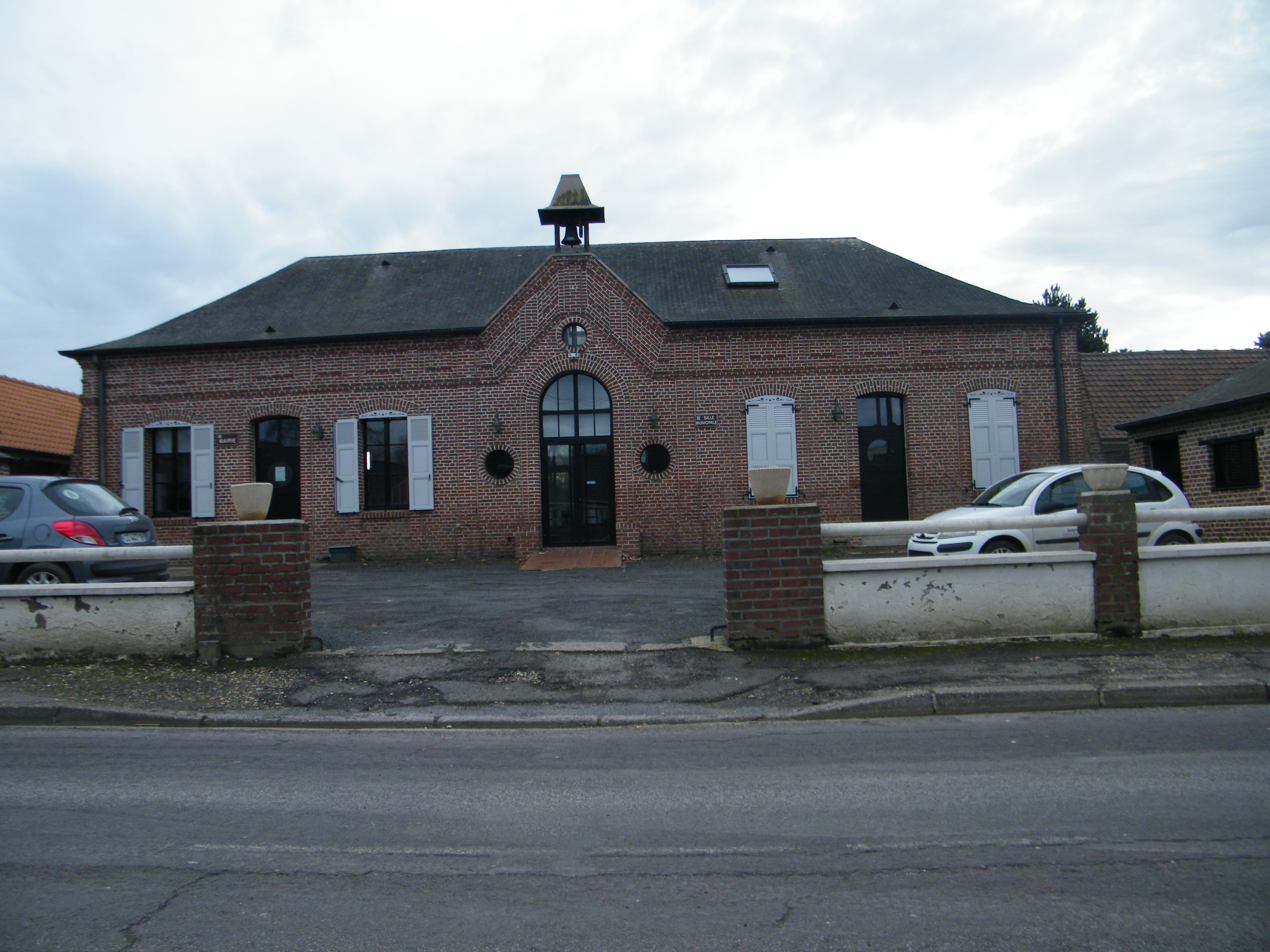
- The town hall in Lamotte-Buleux

- Coat of arms
- Location of Lamotte-Buleux
- Location within France Location within Hauts-de-France
- Coordinates: 50°11′19″N 1°49′56″E
- Country: France
- Region: Hauts-de-France
- Department: Somme
- Arrondissement: Abbeville
- Canton: Abbeville-1
- Intercommunality: CC Ponthieu-Marquenterre

Government
  - Mayor (2020–2026): Stéphane Deleens
- Area^{1}: 6.16 km^{2} (2.38 sq mi)
- Elevation: 58 m (190 ft)
- Highest elevation: 69 m (226 ft)
- Lowest elevation: 48 m (157 ft)
- Population (2023): 328
  - Density: 53.2/km^{2} (138/sq mi)
- Time zone: UTC+01:00 (CET)
  - Summer (DST): UTC+02:00 (CEST)
- INSEE/Postal code: 80462 /80150
- ^{1} French Land Register data, which excludes lakes, ponds, glaciers > 1 km^{2} (0.386 sq mi or 247 acres) and river estuaries.

Lamotte-Buleux (French pronunciation: [lamɔt bylø]; Picard: L'Motte-Buleux) is a commune in the Somme département in Hauts-de-France in northern France.

== Geography ==
The commune is situated on the D32 road, some 6 miles (10 km) north of Abbeville.

== Population ==
Historical population
Year	Pop.	±% p.a.
1968	302	—
1975	273	−1.43%
1982	304	+1.55%
1990	279	−1.07%
1999	288	+0.35%
2007	339	+2.06%
2012	345	+0.35%
2017	352	+0.40%
2023	328	−1.17%
Source: INSEE

== See also ==
- Communes of the Somme department
- Réseau des Bains de Mer
