= Communauté de communes du Haut Clocher =

Coordinates: 50.0779°N 1.995°E

Haut Clocher
- Former communauté de communes
- Interactive map of Haut Clocher
- Country: France
- Region: Hauts-de-France
- Department: Somme
- No. of communes: {{{nbcomm}}}
- Established: 1999
- Disbanded: 2017

The Communauté de communes du Haut Clocher is a former communauté de communes in the Somme département and in the Picardie région of France. It was created in December 1999. It was merged into the new Communauté de communes du Ponthieu-Marquenterre in January 2017.

== Composition ==
This Communauté de communes comprised 20 communes:

1. Ailly-le-Haut-Clocher
2. Brucamps
3. Buigny-l'Abbé
4. Bussus-Bussuel
5. Cocquerel
6. Coulonvillers
7. Cramont
8. Domqueur
9. Ergnies
10. Francières
11. Gorenflos
12. Long
13. Maison-Roland
14. Mesnil-Domqueur
15. Mouflers
16. Oneux
17. Pont-Remy
18. Saint-Riquier
19. Villers-sous-Ailly
20. Yaucourt-Bussus

== See also ==
- Communes of the Somme department
