= Canton of Ailly-le-Haut-Clocher =

Coordinates: 50°4′43″N 1°59′46″E

Ailly-le-Haut-Clocher
- Former canton
- Interactive map of Ailly-le-Haut-Clocher
- Country: France
- Region: Hauts-de-France
- Department: Somme
- No. of communes: {{{nbcomm}}}
- Disbanded: 2015
- Area: 154.75 km^{2} (59.75 sq mi)
- Population (2012): 7,793
  - Density: 50.36/km^{2} (130.4/sq mi)

The Canton of Ailly-le-Haut-Clocher is a former canton situated in the department of the Somme and in the Picardie region of northern France. It was disbanded following the French canton reorganisation which came into effect in March 2015. It consisted of 20 communes, which joined the canton of Rue in 2015. It had 7,793 inhabitants (2012).

== Geography ==
The canton is organised around the commune of Ailly-le-Haut-Clocher in the arrondissement of Abbeville. The altitude varies from 6m at Long to 136m at Cramont for an average of 68m.

The canton comprised 20 communes:

- Ailly-le-Haut-Clocher
- Brucamps
- Buigny-l'Abbé
- Bussus-Bussuel
- Cocquerel
- Coulonvillers
- Cramont
- Domqueur
- Ergnies
- Francières
- Gorenflos
- Long
- Maison-Roland
- Mesnil-Domqueur
- Mouflers
- Oneux
- Pont-Remy
- Saint-Riquier
- Villers-sous-Ailly
- Yaucourt-Bussus

== Population ==
Population Growth
1962	1968	1975	1982	1990	1999
7090	7297	6870	6686	6825	7043
Census count starting from 1962 : Population without double counting

== See also ==
- Arrondissements of the Somme department
- Cantons of the Somme department
- Communes of the Somme department
