= Canton of Crécy-en-Ponthieu =

Coordinates: 50°15′11″N 1°53′2″E

Crécy-en-Ponthieu
- Former canton
- Interactive map of Crécy-en-Ponthieu
- Country: France
- Region: Hauts-de-France
- Department: Somme
- No. of communes: {{{nbcomm}}}
- Disbanded: 2015
- Area: 225.59 km^{2} (87.10 sq mi)
- Population (2012): 6,023
  - Density: 26.70/km^{2} (69.15/sq mi)

The Canton of Crécy-en-Ponthieu is a former canton situated in the department of the Somme and in the Picardie region of northern France. It was disbanded following the French canton reorganisation which came into effect in March 2015. It had 6,023 inhabitants (2012).

== Geography ==
The canton is organised around the commune of Crécy-en-Ponthieu in the arrondissement of Abbeville. The altitude varies from 7m at Dominois to 142m at Domléger-Longvillers for an average of 61m.

The canton comprised 21 communes:

- Le Boisle
- Boufflers
- Brailly-Cornehotte
- Conteville
- Crécy-en-Ponthieu
- Dominois
- Domléger-Longvillers
- Dompierre-sur-Authie
- Estrées-lès-Crécy
- Fontaine-sur-Maye
- Froyelles
- Gueschart
- Hiermont
- Ligescourt
- Maison-Ponthieu
- Neuilly-le-Dien
- Noyelles-en-Chaussée
- Ponches-Estruval
- Vitz-sur-Authie
- Yvrench
- Yvrencheux

== Population ==
Population Growth
1962	1968	1975	1982	1990	1999
6881	7282	6711	6307	5939	5873
Census count starting from 1962 : Population without double counting

== See also ==
- Arrondissements of the Somme department
- Cantons of the Somme department
- Communes of the Somme department
