= Jean-Didier Berger =

French politician (born 1980)

Member of the French National Assembly for Hauts-de-Seine's 12th constituency
- Incumbent
- Assumed office 18 July 2024
- Preceded by: Jean-Louis Bourlanges

Personal details
- Born: 23 January 1980 (age 46)
- Party: The Republicans (2015–2019; since 2021); Soyons libres (since 2019); Union for a Popular Movement (until 2015)

Jean-Didier Berger (born 23 January 1980) is a French politician of the Republicans (LR) who has been serving as elected member of the National Assembly for Hauts-de-Seine's 12th constituency since the 2024 elections.

== Political career ==
Since 2021, Berger has served as first vice president of the Regional Council of Île-de-France.

For the 2022 French presidential election, Berger worked on Valérie Pécresse's campaign team.

=== Member of the National Assembly, 2024–present ===
In parliament, Berger has been serving on the Committee on Economic Affairs since 2024. In addition to his committee assignments, he is part of the French-Armenian Parliamentary Friendship Group.

In the Republicans' 2025 leadership election, Berger endorsed Laurent Wauquiez to succeed Éric Ciotti as the party's new chair and joined his campaign team.
