= Loi pour l'investissement locatif (Loi Robien) =

The Robien Package (French: Dispositif Robien), also known as the Loi pour l'investissement locatif (English: Law for Real Estate Investment) was a measure created by the law 2003-590 on 2 July 2003 to support the creation of urban rental properties. It replaced the Besson Project (Dispositif Besson) of 1999 (not to be confused with the Besson Law of 1990 (See: fr:Loi visant à la mise en œuvre du droit au logement)), itself the successor of the Périssol amortization that was put into place in 1996. It has since been phased out and has been replaced by the fr:Dispositif Scellier in 2008.

The Robien Package effectively increased the number of urban new constructions, especially in certain medium-sized cities. Named after the politician Gilles de Robien (UMP-UDF) and enacted under the Raffarin government, the law established a project to introduce fiscal benefits to investors owning rental properties meeting certain criteria and certain policyholders of the Société civile de placement immobilier.

The project received some criticism, not least for giving incentive for some private investors, particularly those with little experience, to purchase real estate from unscrupulous real estate developers and in areas under construction in smaller cities where the rental market became quickly saturated. Consequentially, the investors were unable to benefit from the financial benefits of the law as they were unable to rent them out for the duration expected by the project. According to the 2008 report of Jean-Yves Le Bouillonec (MP), some Robien rentals were among the most expensive in medium-sized cities, for example in Angers, where the average rental price of a 65 m^{2} apartment was €361 in 2007 compared to €924 of its Robien equivalent. The project had an annual cost a total of €400 million.
