= Agenville =

Commune in Hauts-de-France, France

- Commune
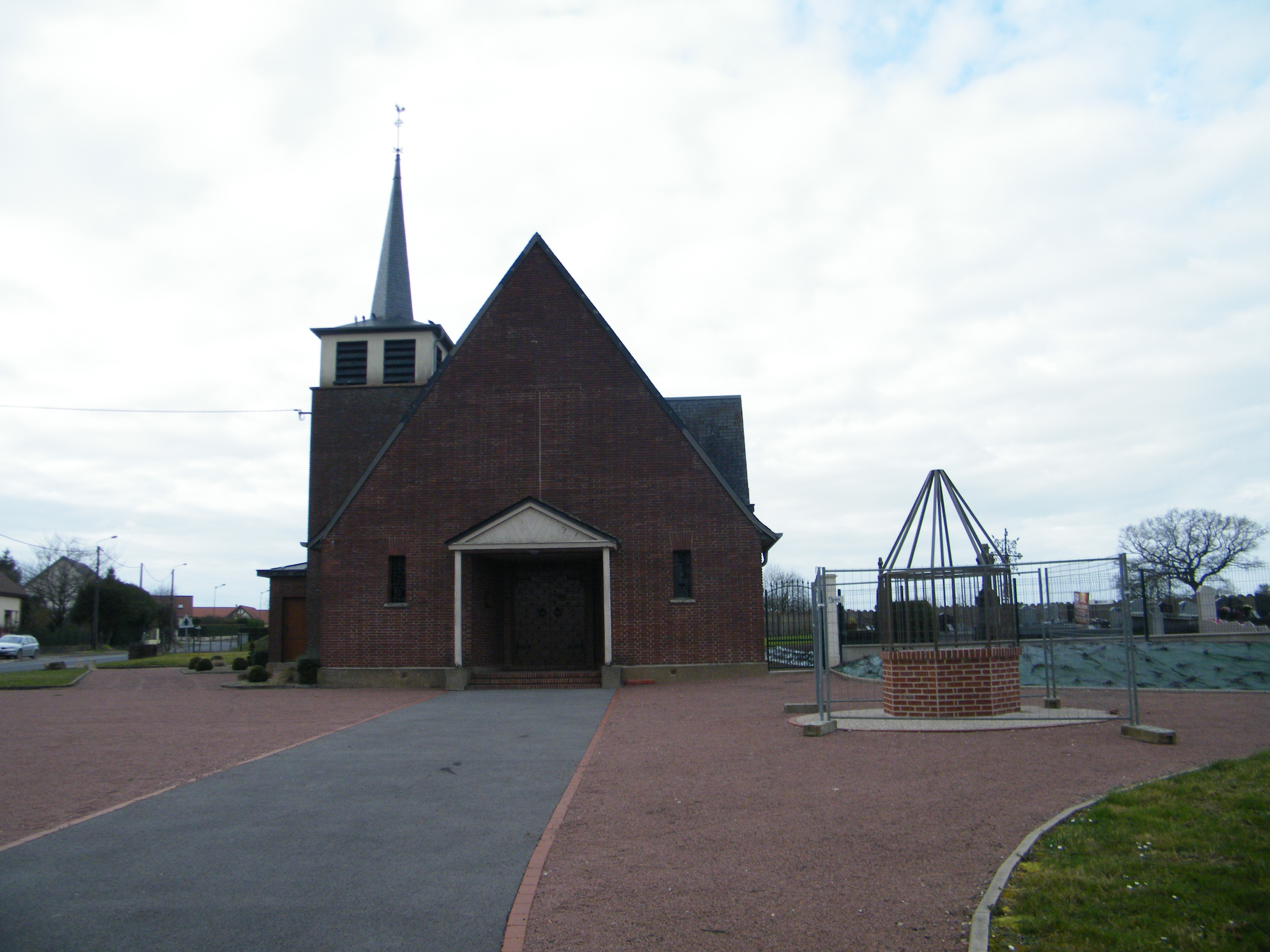
- The church of Saint-Sauveur
- Location of Agenville
- Location within France Location within Hauts-de-France
- Coordinates: 50°09′59″N 2°06′13″E
- Country: France
- Region: Hauts-de-France
- Department: Somme
- Arrondissement: Amiens
- Canton: Doullens
- Intercommunality: Territoire Nord Picardie

Government
  - Mayor (2022–2026): Ludivine Lefort
- Area^{1}: 3.3 km^{2} (1.3 sq mi)
- Elevation: 140 m (460 ft)
- Highest elevation: 136 m (446 ft)
- Lowest elevation: 88 m (289 ft)
- Population (2023): 83
  - Density: 25/km^{2} (65/sq mi)
- Time zone: UTC+01:00 (CET)
  - Summer (DST): UTC+02:00 (CEST)
- INSEE/Postal code: 80005 /80370
- ^{1} French Land Register data, which excludes lakes, ponds, glaciers > 1 km^{2} (0.386 sq mi or 247 acres) and river estuaries.

Agenville (French pronunciation: [aʒɑ̃vil]; Picard: Adinville) is a commune in the Somme department in Hauts-de-France in northern France.

== Geography ==
The commune is a village of mixed farming situated 25 km (16 mi) northeast of Abbeville on the D56 road. It is surrounded by the communes Domléger-Longvillers, Conteville and Prouville.

== History ==
Destroyed by the English at the time of the battle of Crecy in 1346 and rebuilt on a new site. Rebuilt after the bombardments of 1944, when 95% of the village was destroyed, as the V1 rocket site was nearby. Agenville was once a centre of a pilgrimage.

== Population ==
Historical population
Year	Pop.	±% p.a.
1968	103	—
1975	95	−1.15%
1982	89	−0.93%
1990	84	−0.72%
1999	91	+0.89%
2007	107	+2.05%
2012	107	+0.00%
2017	91	−3.19%
2023	83	−1.52%
Source: INSEE

== See also ==
- Communes of the Somme department
