= Mesnil-Domqueur =

- Commune
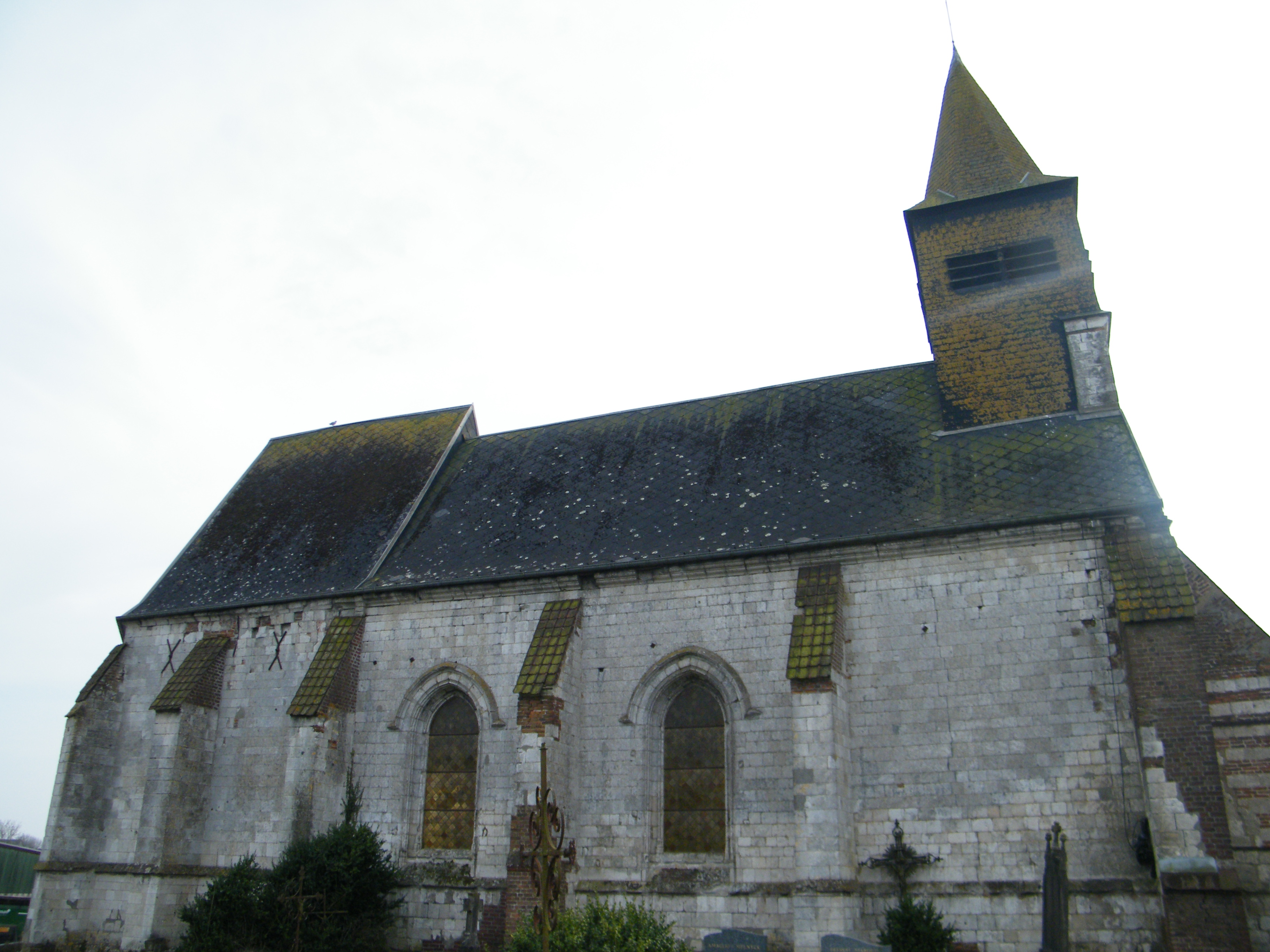
- The church in Mesnil-Domqueur

- Coat of arms
- Location of Mesnil-Domqueur
- Location within France Location within Hauts-de-France
- Coordinates: 50°08′13″N 2°04′18″E
- Country: France
- Region: Hauts-de-France
- Department: Somme
- Arrondissement: Abbeville
- Canton: Rue
- Intercommunality: CC Ponthieu-Marquenterre

Government
  - Mayor (2020–2026): Philippe Pierrin
- Area^{1}: 3.49 km^{2} (1.35 sq mi)
- Elevation: 122 m (400 ft)
- Highest elevation: 134 m (440 ft)
- Lowest elevation: 98 m (322 ft)
- Population (2023): 88
  - Density: 25/km^{2} (65/sq mi)
- Time zone: UTC+01:00 (CET)
  - Summer (DST): UTC+02:00 (CEST)
- INSEE/Postal code: 80537 /80620
- ^{1} French Land Register data, which excludes lakes, ponds, glaciers > 1 km^{2} (0.386 sq mi or 247 acres) and river estuaries.

Mesnil-Domqueur (French pronunciation: [menil dɔ̃kœʁ]; Picard: Au Mouni-Dontcheur) is a commune in the Somme department in Hauts-de-France in northern France.

== Geography ==
The commune is situated on the D130 road, some 17 kilometres (11 mi) northeast of Abbeville. It is surrounded by the communes Cramont, Domqueur and Domléger-Longvillers.

== Population ==
Historical population
Year	Pop.	±% p.a.
1968	86	—
1975	70	−2.90%
1982	81	+2.11%
1990	79	−0.31%
1999	57	−3.56%
2007	83	+4.81%
2012	87	+0.95%
2017	88	+0.23%
2023	88	+0.00%
Source: INSEE

== See also ==
- Communes of the Somme department
