= Brigitte Fouré =

French politician (born 1955)

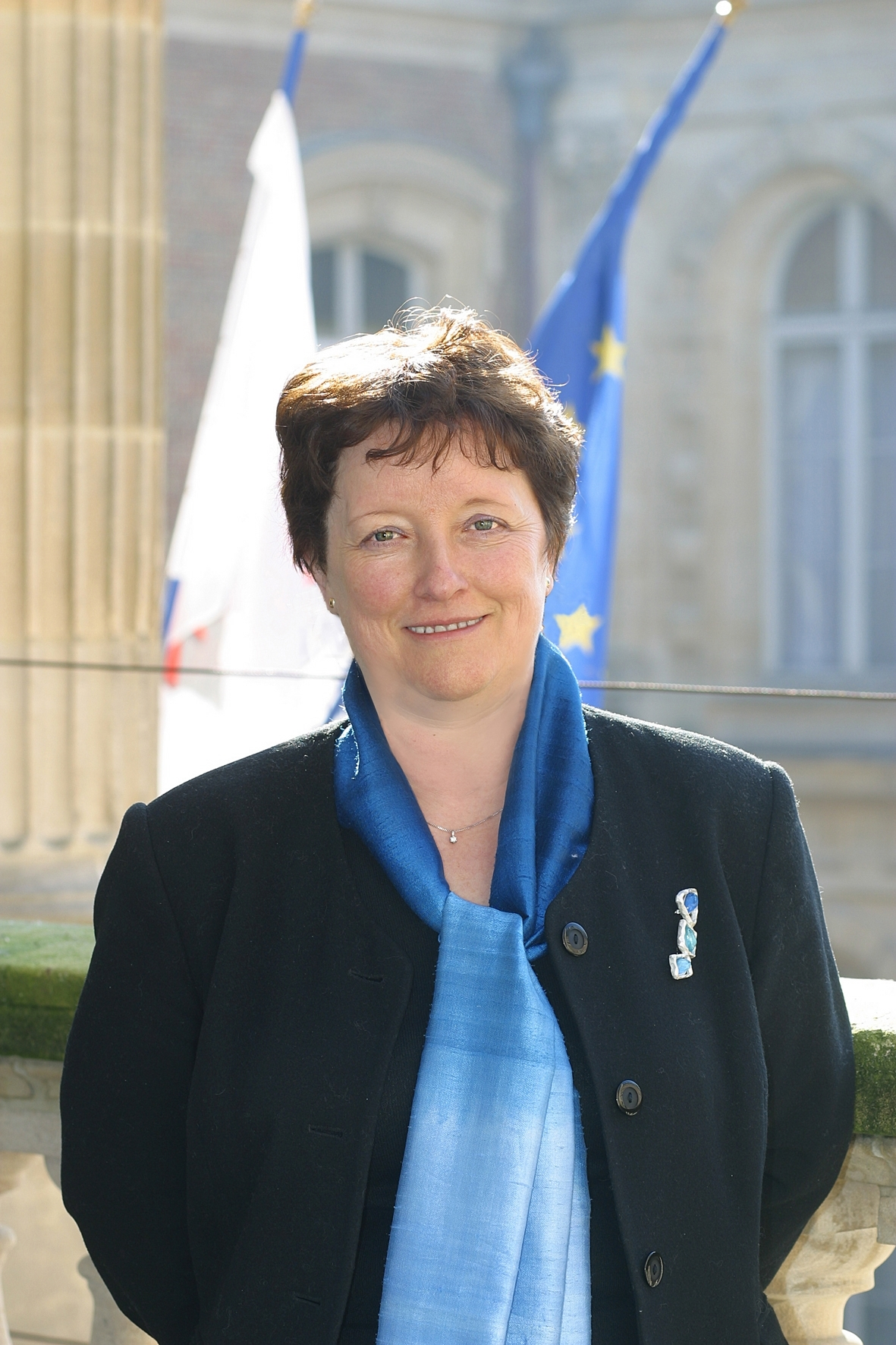

Mayor of Amiens
- In office 4 April 2014 – 24 October 2024
- Preceded by: Gilles Demailly
- Succeeded by: Hubert de Jenlis
- In office 27 June 2002 – 29 March 2007
- Preceded by: Gilles de Robien
- Succeeded by: Gilles de Robien

First Vice-President of the Regional Council of Hauts-de-France
- Incumbent
- Assumed office 23 November 2017

Member of the General Council of Somme
- In office 28 June 2010 – 8 September 2014

Member of the European Parliament
- In office 10 January 2008 – 13 July 2009
- Preceded by: Jean-Louis Bourlanges

Member of the Regional Council of Picardy
- In office 21 March 1998 – 1 January 2008
- Succeeded by: Gilles de Robien

Personal details
- Born: 13 August 1955 (age 71) Amiens, France
- Party: UDI
- Education: Panthéon-Assas University

Brigitte Fouré (French pronunciation: [bʁiʒit fuʁe]; born 13 August 1955 in Amiens) is a French university lecturer and former government minister, a member of the Nouveau Centre and of Société en mouvement ("Society on the Move"). She is also a lecturer in law at the University of Picardie Jules Verne.

== Early life and education ==
Daughter of a farmer, Fouré studied law at Amiens and Paris.

== Political career ==
An activist for the UNI and then the CNI, Fouré was elected regional councillor in 1986 and conseillère municipale ("Municipal Councillor") in 1989. With Gilles de Robien she had responsibility for education and youth work. She joined the Parti républicain ("Republican Party") in 1992, within the Union for French Democracy. She became Mayor of Amiens in 1992 and was appointed a minister in Jean-Pierre Raffarin's first government.

In the French Regional Elections of 2004, Fouré was elected on the right-wing ticket of Gilles de Robien. She resigned on 23 March 2007 to become second deputy mayor with responsibility for Local Democracy, Community Life, Prevention and Security.

On 1 January 2008 Fouré succeeded Jean-Louis Bourlanges as a Member of the European Parliament. In parliament, she briefly served on the Committee on Transport and Tourism. Her mandate expired in June 2009.

== Current mandates ==
- Regional Councillor of Picardy
- Municipal Councillor of Amiens

== Political positions ==
In 2019, Fouré publicly declared her support for incumbent President Emmanuel Macron.

== Honours ==
- Chevalier de la Légion d'honneur

== Sources ==
This article was translated from its equivalent in the French Wikipedia on 19 July 2009.
