= Bussus-lès-Yaucourt =

- Commune
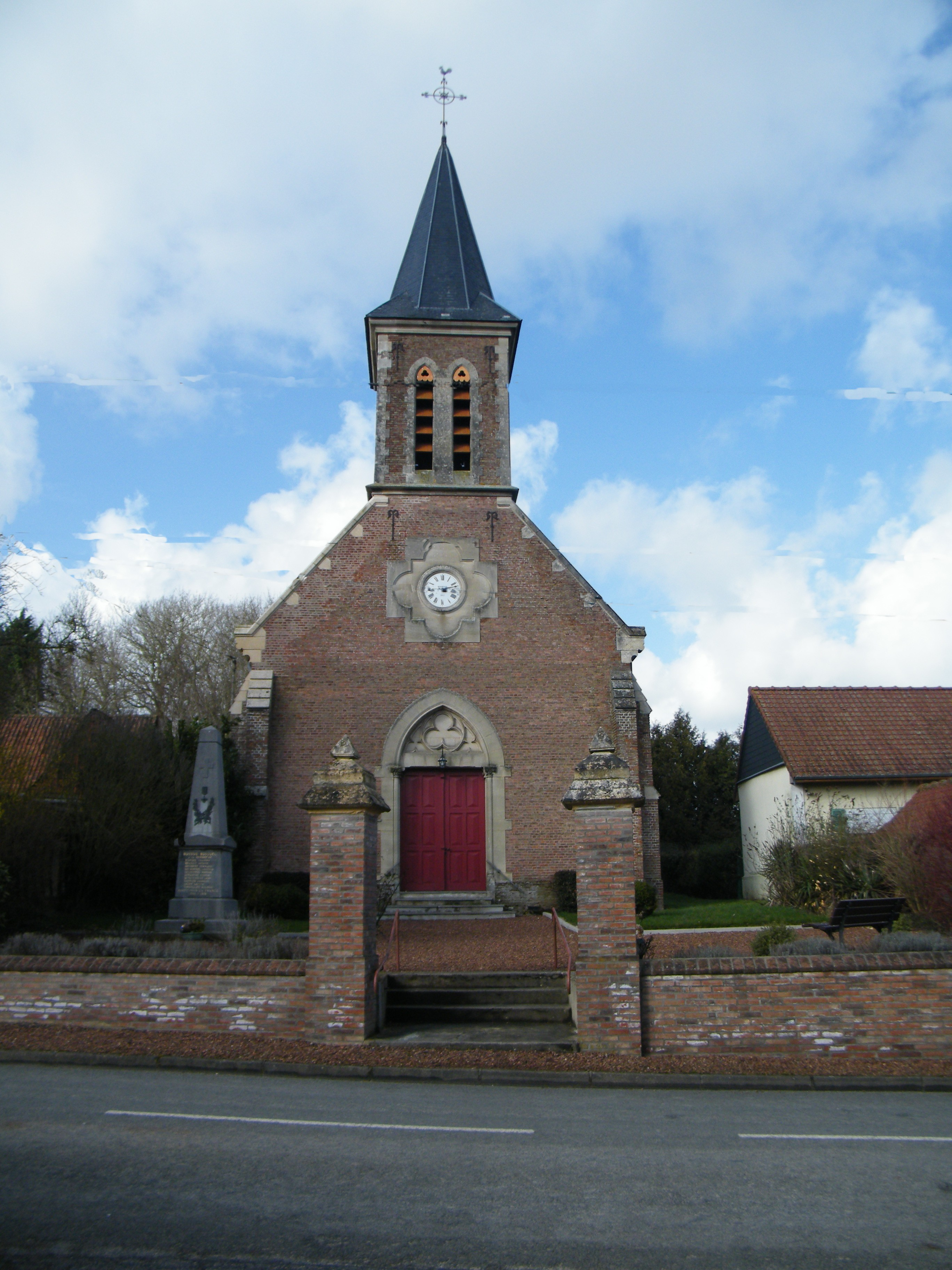
- The church in Bussus
- Location of Bussus-lès-Yaucourt
- Location within France Location within Hauts-de-France
- Coordinates: 50°06′38″N 2°00′02″E
- Country: France
- Region: Hauts-de-France
- Department: Somme
- Arrondissement: Abbeville
- Canton: Rue
- Intercommunality: CC Ponthieu-Marquenterre

Government
  - Mayor (2025–2026): Mathieu Doyer
- Area^{1}: 15.19 km^{2} (5.86 sq mi)
- Highest elevation: 112 m (367 ft)
- Lowest elevation: 35 m (115 ft)
- Population (2023): 556
  - Density: 36.6/km^{2} (94.8/sq mi)
- Time zone: UTC+01:00 (CET)
  - Summer (DST): UTC+02:00 (CEST)
- INSEE/Postal code: 80155 /80135
- ^{1} French Land Register data, which excludes lakes, ponds, glaciers > 1 km^{2} (0.386 sq mi or 247 acres) and river estuaries.

Bussus-lès-Yaucourt is a commune in the Somme department in Hauts-de-France in northern France. It was formed on 1 January 2025, with the merger of Bussus-Bussuel and Yaucourt-Bussus.

== See also ==
- Communes of the Somme department
