= Jean-Pierre Schosteck =

French politician (born 1942)

Mayor of Châtillon
- In office 14 March 1983 – 3 July 2020
- Preceded by: Jacques Le Dauphin
- Succeeded by: Nadège Azzaz

Deputy of the National Assembly for Hauts-de-Seine's 12th constituency
- In office 4 February 2008 – 19 June 2012
- Preceded by: Philippe Pemezec
- Succeeded by: Jean-Marc Germain

Personal details
- Born: 16 March 1942 (age 83); Paris, France
- Political party: The Republicans

Jean-Pierre Schosteck (born 16 March 1942) is a French politician. He is mayor of Châtillon and a member of The Republicans.
