= Foreign Affairs Committee (France) =

Standing committee of the French National Assembly

The Foreign Affairs Committee (French: Commission des Affaires étrangères) is one of the eight standing committees of the French National Assembly.

== Chairmen ==
- Édouard Balladur - 12th legislature of the French Fifth Republic
- Axel Poniatowski - 13th legislature of the French Fifth Republic
- Élisabeth Guigou - 14th legislature of the French Fifth Republic
- Marielle de Sarnez - 15th legislature of the French Fifth Republic, Jean-Louis Bourlanges after her death in January 2021 until the end of the legislature
- Jean-Louis Bourlanges - 16th legislature of the French Fifth Republic
- Jean-Noël Barrot - 17th legislature of the French Fifth Republic
