= Beaumetz =

Commune in northern France

- Commune
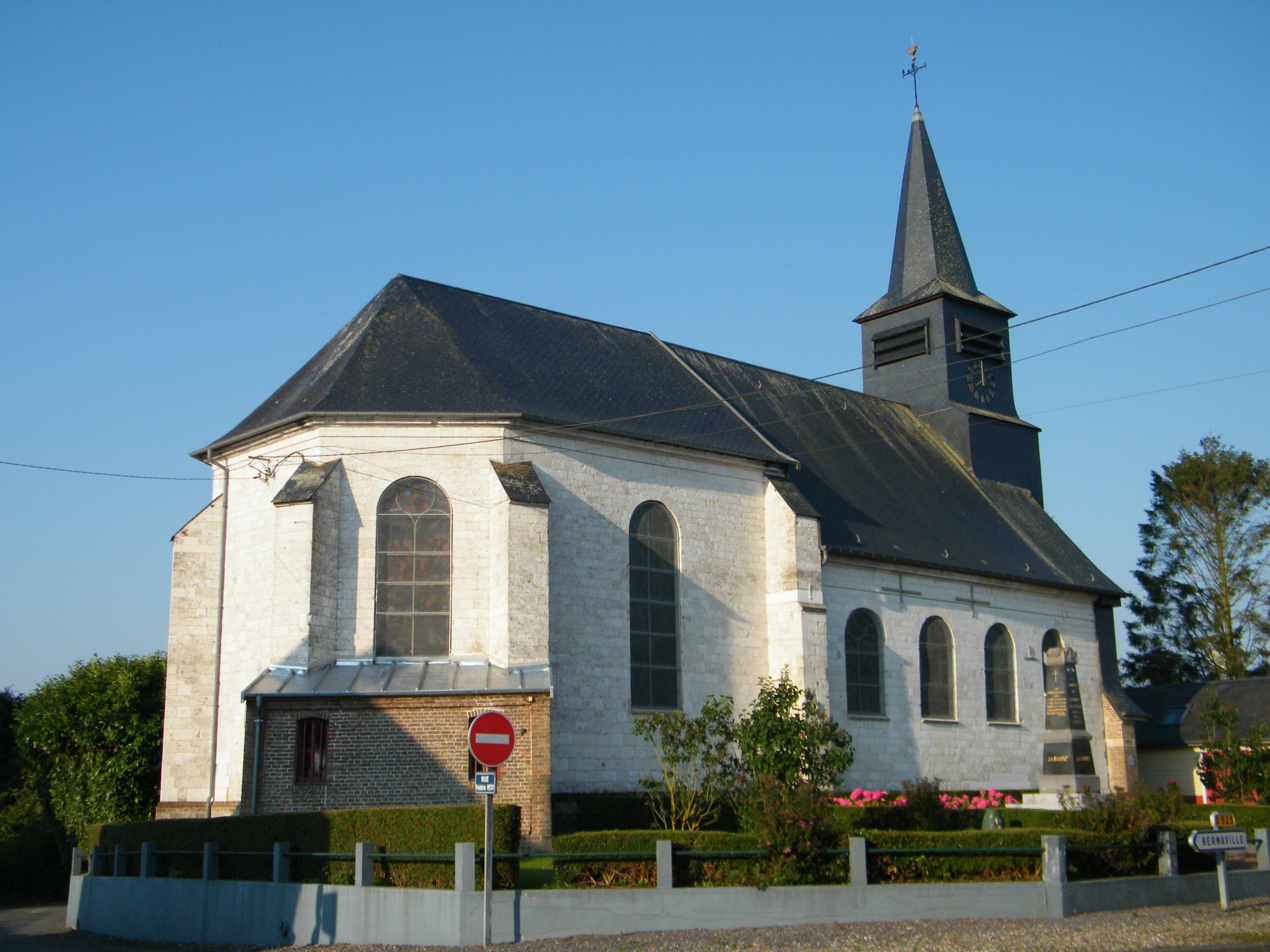
- The church in Beaumetz

- Coat of arms
- Location of Beaumetz
- Location within France Location within Hauts-de-France
- Coordinates: 50°08′30″N 2°07′19″E
- Country: France
- Region: Hauts-de-France
- Department: Somme
- Arrondissement: Amiens
- Canton: Doullens
- Intercommunality: CC Territoire Nord Picardie

Government
  - Mayor (2020–2026): Jean-Michel Magnier
- Area^{1}: 6.16 km^{2} (2.38 sq mi)
- Elevation: 142 m (466 ft)
- Highest elevation: 144 m (472 ft)
- Lowest elevation: 93 m (305 ft)
- Population (2023): 215
  - Density: 34.9/km^{2} (90.4/sq mi)
- Time zone: UTC+01:00 (CET)
  - Summer (DST): UTC+02:00 (CEST)
- INSEE/Postal code: 80068 /80370
- ^{1} French Land Register data, which excludes lakes, ponds, glaciers > 1 km^{2} (0.386 sq mi or 247 acres) and river estuaries.

Beaumetz (Picard: Bieumé) is a commune in the Somme department in Hauts-de-France in northern France.

== Geography ==
Beaumetz is situated at the junction of the D185 and D925 roads, some 20 miles (32 km) east of Abbeville. It is surrounded by the communes Ribeaucourt, Prouville and Domesmont.

== Population ==
Historical population
Year	Pop.	±% p.a.
1968	198	—
1975	191	−0.51%
1982	167	−1.90%
1990	157	−0.77%
1999	170	+0.89%
2007	199	+1.99%
2012	230	+2.94%
2017	226	−0.35%
2023	215	−0.83%
Source: INSEE

== See also ==
- Communes of the Somme department
