= Jean-Marc Germain (politician) =

French politician (born 1966)

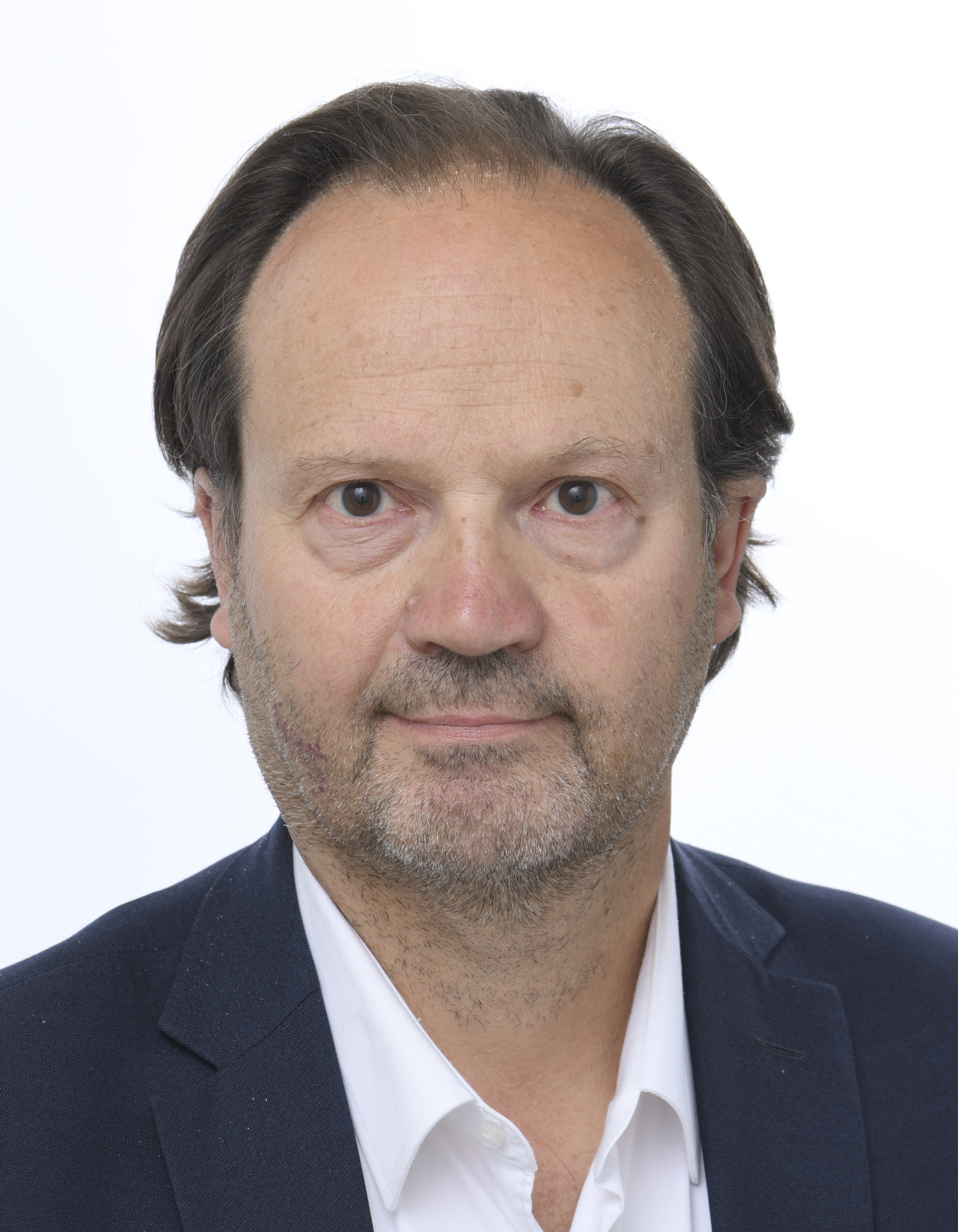

First Gentleman of Paris
- In office 5 April 2014 – 29 March 2026
- Mayor: Anne Hidalgo
- Preceded by: Xavière Tiberi

Member of the European Parliament for France
- Incumbent
- Assumed office 16 July 2024

Member of the National Assembly for Hauts-de-Seine's 12th constituency
- In office 20 June 2012 – 20 June 2017
- Preceded by: Jean-Pierre Schosteck
- Succeeded by: Jean-Louis Bourlanges

Personal details
- Born: 12 June 1966 (age 60) Lyon, France
- Party: Socialist Party
- Spouse: Anne Hidalgo (m. 2004)
- Children: Arthur Germain
- Education: École Polytechnique; École des hautes études en sciences sociales

Jean-Marc Germain (French pronunciation: [ʒɑ̃ maʁk ʒɛʁmɛ̃]; born 12 June 1966) is a French politician, member of the Socialist Party. He is the cabinet director of Martine Aubry in Socialist Party, and was elected to the European Parliament in 2024. Germain is also the husband of Anne Hidalgo, the former Mayor of Paris.

== Professional career ==
A graduate of the École Polytechnique, in 1992 he joined the Department of Forecasting at the Ministry of Economy and Finance. In August 1997, he joined the firm of Martine Aubry at the Ministry of Employment and Solidarity as a technical advisor, then in 2000 the office of Lionel Jospin at Matignon. In 2003, he found Martine Aubry in the urban community of Lille Métropole, as Deputy Director General of Services. Still with Martine Aubry, he became in 2005 general director of services of the city of Lille, and in 2008 director of cabinet of Martine Aubry, then both president of Lille metropolis and first secretary of the Socialist Party.

In the legislative election 2012, he was elected deputy of Hauts-de-Seine's 12th constituency.

== Personal life ==
In June 2004, he married Anne Hidalgo, then deputy mayor of Paris, encountered Martine Aubry firm in 1993. Together they have a son, Arthur, was born in 2001. It is the mayor of Paris, Bertrand Delanoë, who officiated the marriage, of which Martine Aubry is one of the witnesses.

== Political career ==
=== National mandates ===
On June 17, 2012, Jean-Marc Germain was elected MP for the twelfth district of Hauts-de-Seine in the second round of the legislative election, after a duel with Philippe Pemezec.

He is part of the group of deputies known as "slingers".

In the 2017 parliamentary elections, he was eliminated in the first round, in 4th position with 9.24% of the votes.

=== Political functions ===
He is the former cabinet director of Martine Aubry in the Socialist Party (PS). In 2012, following the Toulouse Congress, he was appointed National Secretary for Employment and Labor. In March 2014, he became National Secretary for La Francophonie.

He supported Benoît Hamon in the second round of the primary citizen of 2017 and became co-director of his presidential campaign with MP Mathieu Hanotin.

On July 8, 2017, he joined the PS collegiate leadership.

== Works ==
Tout avait si bien commencé : journal d'un « frondeur », éditions de l'Atelier, 2015.
