= Prouville =

- Commune
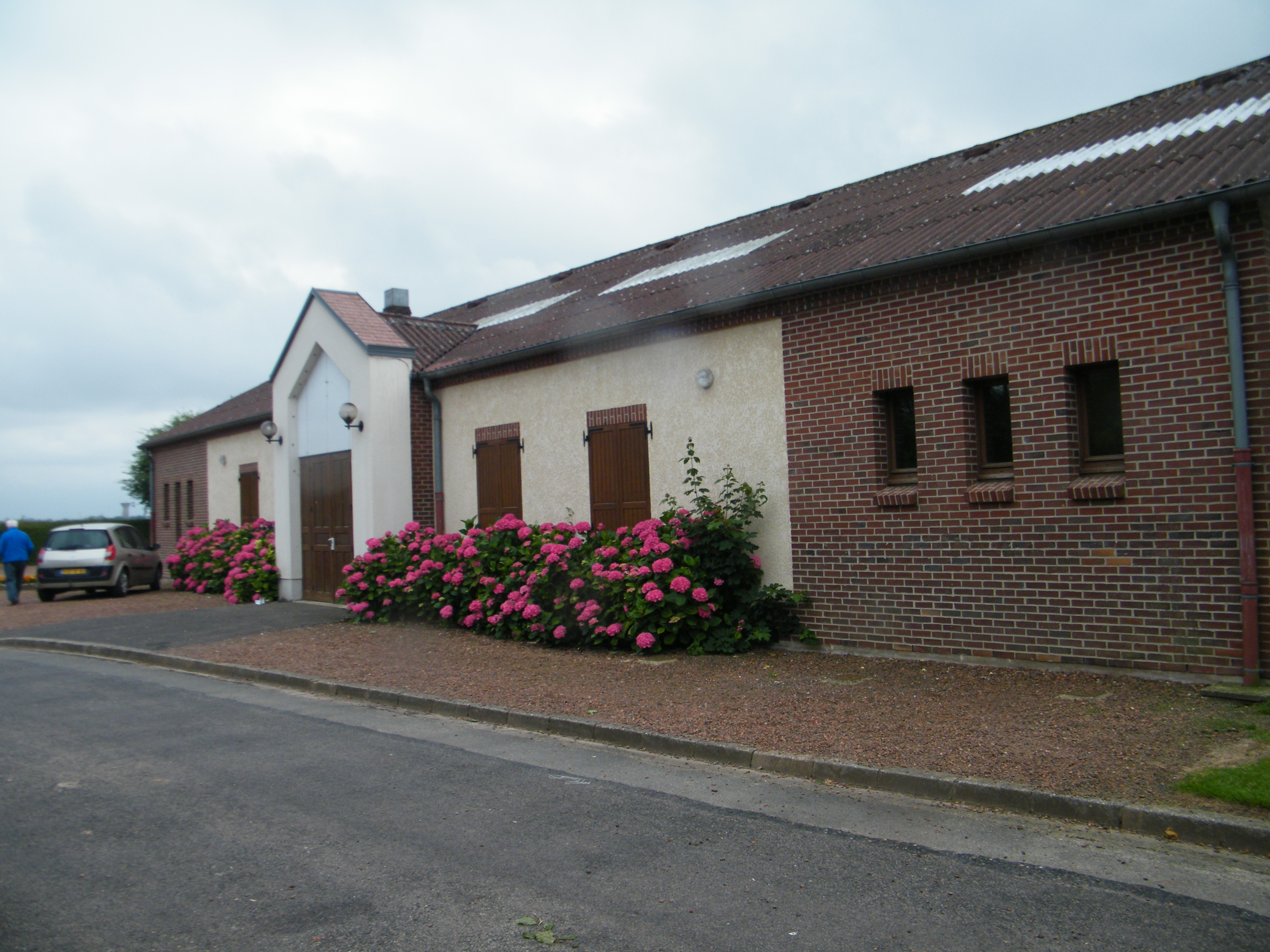
- The town hall in Prouville
- Location of Prouville
- Location within France Location within Hauts-de-France
- Coordinates: 50°08′54″N 2°07′35″E
- Country: France
- Region: Hauts-de-France
- Department: Somme
- Arrondissement: Amiens
- Canton: Doullens
- Intercommunality: CC Territoire Nord Picardie

Government
  - Mayor (2023–2026): Patrick Morival
- Area^{1}: 8.81 km^{2} (3.40 sq mi)
- Elevation: 140 m (460 ft)
- Highest elevation: 149 m (489 ft)
- Lowest elevation: 85 m (279 ft)
- Population (2023): 304
  - Density: 34.5/km^{2} (89.4/sq mi)
- Time zone: UTC+01:00 (CET)
  - Summer (DST): UTC+02:00 (CEST)
- INSEE/Postal code: 80642 /80370
- ^{1} French Land Register data, which excludes lakes, ponds, glaciers > 1 km^{2} (0.386 sq mi or 247 acres) and river estuaries.

Prouville (French pronunciation: [pʁuvil]) is a commune in the Somme department in Hauts-de-France in northern France.

== Geography ==
Prouville is situated on the D56 and D185 crossroads, some 21 kilometres (13 mi) east northeast of Abbeville. It is surrounded by the communes Beaumetz, Agenville and Bernaville.

== Population ==
Historical population
Year	Pop.	±% p.a.
1968	352	—
1975	297	−2.40%
1982	270	−1.35%
1990	275	+0.23%
1999	258	−0.71%
2007	305	+2.11%
2012	294	−0.73%
2017	314	+1.32%
2023	304	−0.54%
Source: INSEE

== See also ==
- Communes of the Somme department
