= Domléger-Longvillers =

- Commune
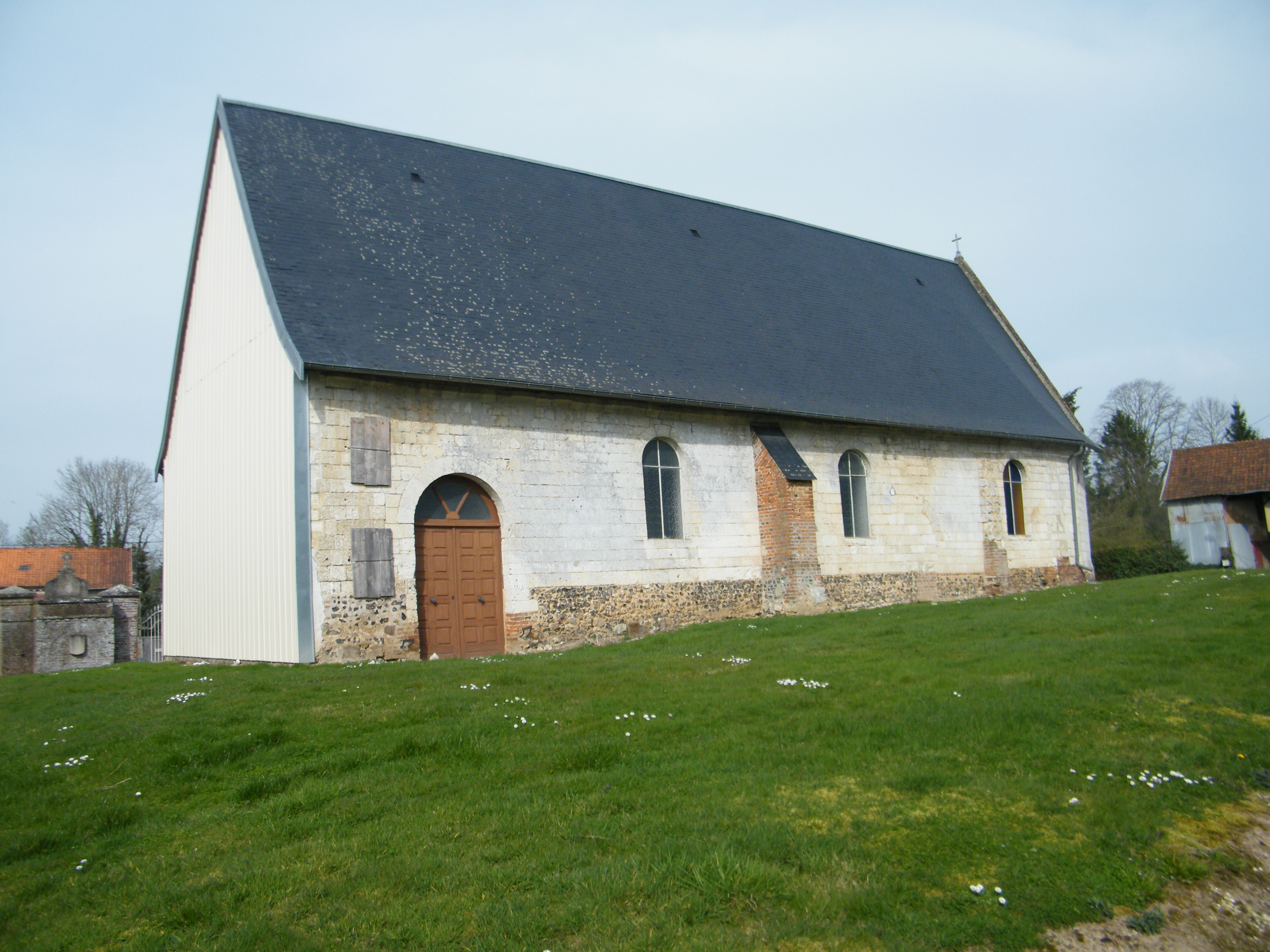
- The church in Longvillers
- Location of Domléger-Longvillers
- Location within France Location within Hauts-de-France
- Coordinates: 50°09′40″N 2°05′12″E
- Country: France
- Region: Hauts-de-France
- Department: Somme
- Arrondissement: Amiens
- Canton: Doullens
- Intercommunality: CC Territoire Nord Picardie

Government
  - Mayor (2020–2026): Yves Douay
- Area^{1}: 8.91 km^{2} (3.44 sq mi)
- Elevation: 141 m (463 ft)
- Highest elevation: 142 m (466 ft)
- Lowest elevation: 100 m (330 ft)
- Population (2023): 287
  - Density: 32.2/km^{2} (83.4/sq mi)
- Time zone: UTC+01:00 (CET)
  - Summer (DST): UTC+02:00 (CEST)
- INSEE/Postal code: 80245 /80370
- ^{1} French Land Register data, which excludes lakes, ponds, glaciers > 1 km^{2} (0.386 sq mi or 247 acres) and river estuaries.

Domléger-Longvillers (Picard: Donnegé-Neuvilé) is a commune in the Somme department in Hauts-de-France in northern France.

== Geography ==
The commune is situated on the D267 and D46 crossroads, some 19 kilometres (12 mi) northeast of Abbeville. It is surrounded by the communes Agenville, Cramont and Conteville.

== Population ==
Its inhabitants are called Domlégeois and Domlégeoises in French.

Historical population
Year	Pop.	±% p.a.
1968	372	—
1975	312	−2.48%
1982	255	−2.84%
1990	257	+0.10%
1999	267	+0.43%
2007	265	−0.09%
2012	280	+1.11%
2017	302	+1.52%
2023	287	−0.85%
Source: INSEE

== See also ==
- Communes of the Somme department
