= Gilles de Robien =

French politician (born 1941)

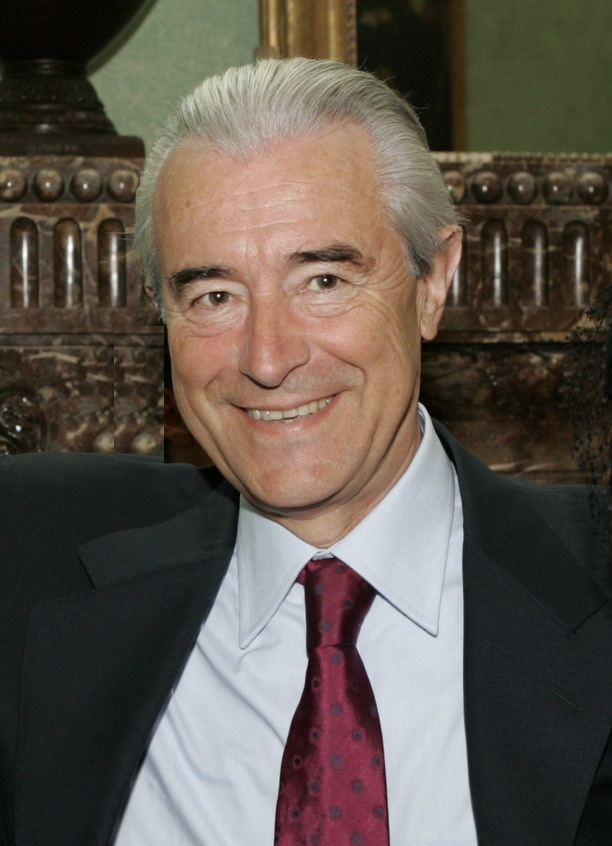

Minister of National Education
- In office 31 May 2005 – 15 May 2007
- President: Jacques Chirac
- Prime Minister: Dominique de Villepin
- Preceded by: François Fillon
- Succeeded by: Xavier Darcos

Minister of Transport
- In office 7 May 2002 – 31 May 2005
- President: Jacques Chirac
- Prime Minister: Jean-Pierre Raffarin
- Preceded by: Jean-Claude Gayssot
- Succeeded by: Dominique Perben

Mayor of Amiens
- In office 24 March 1989 – 27 June 2002
- Preceded by: René Lamps
- Succeeded by: Brigitte Fouré
- In office 29 March 2007 – 21 March 2008
- Preceded by: Brigitte Fouré
- Succeeded by: Gilles Demailly

Personal details
- Born: 10 April 1941 (age 84) Cocquerel, France
- Party: UDF
- Education: Lycée Hoche

Vicomte Gilles de Robien (French pronunciation: [ʒil də ʁɔbjɛ̃]; born 10 April 1941) is a French politician and former government minister.

The son of Count Jean de Robien by his wife Éliane Le Mesre de Pas, he is descended from the noble Breton family de Robien.

In 1989, De Robien was elected Mayor of Amiens, being re-elected for two further terms. However, in the French municipal elections of 2008, he was defeated by Gilles Demailly of the French Socialist Party.

De Robien served as French Minister for Education from August 2005 to May 2007, and as a Deputy from 1996 to 2007.

== Political career ==
Government offices

Minister for Transport: 2002–2005.

Minister for National Education: 2005–2007.

Electoral mandates

National Assembly of France

Vice President of the National Assembly of France: 1993–1998.

Member of the National Assembly of France for the Somme: 1986–2002 (appointed Minister in 2002). Elected in 1986 (re-elected: 1988, 1993, 1997, 2002).

Regional Council

Regional Councillor of Picardy: 1992–2004. Re-elected in 1998.

Municipal Council

Mayor of Amiens: 1989–2002 (Resigned) / 2007–2008. Re-elected in 1995, 2001, 2007.

Deputy Mayor of Amiens: 2002–2007.

City Councillor of Amiens: 1989–2008. Re-elected in 1995, 2001.

Agglomeration Community Council

President of the Communauté d'agglomération Amiens Métropole: 1994–2008. Re-elected in 1995, 2001.

Member of the Communauté d'agglomération Amiens Métropole: 1994–2008. Re-elected in 1995, 2001.

== Honours ==
- Chevalier, Légion d'honneur
- Commandeur, Order of Palmes académiques
- Honorary Knight Commander of the Order of the British Empire (Hon. KBE)
- Grand Officer, Ordem Nacional do Cruzeiro do Sul (Brasil)
- Grand Cross, Orden al Mérito de Chile
- Grand Cross, Orden del Mérito Civil (Spain)
- Knight Grand Cross, Ordine al merito della Repubblica Italiana
- Grand Officer, Order of Ouissam Alaouite (Morocco)

Political offices
Preceded by François Fillon	Minister of National Education; 2005 – 2007	Succeeded by Xavier Darcos
