= Jean-Louis Bourlanges =

French politician (born 1946)

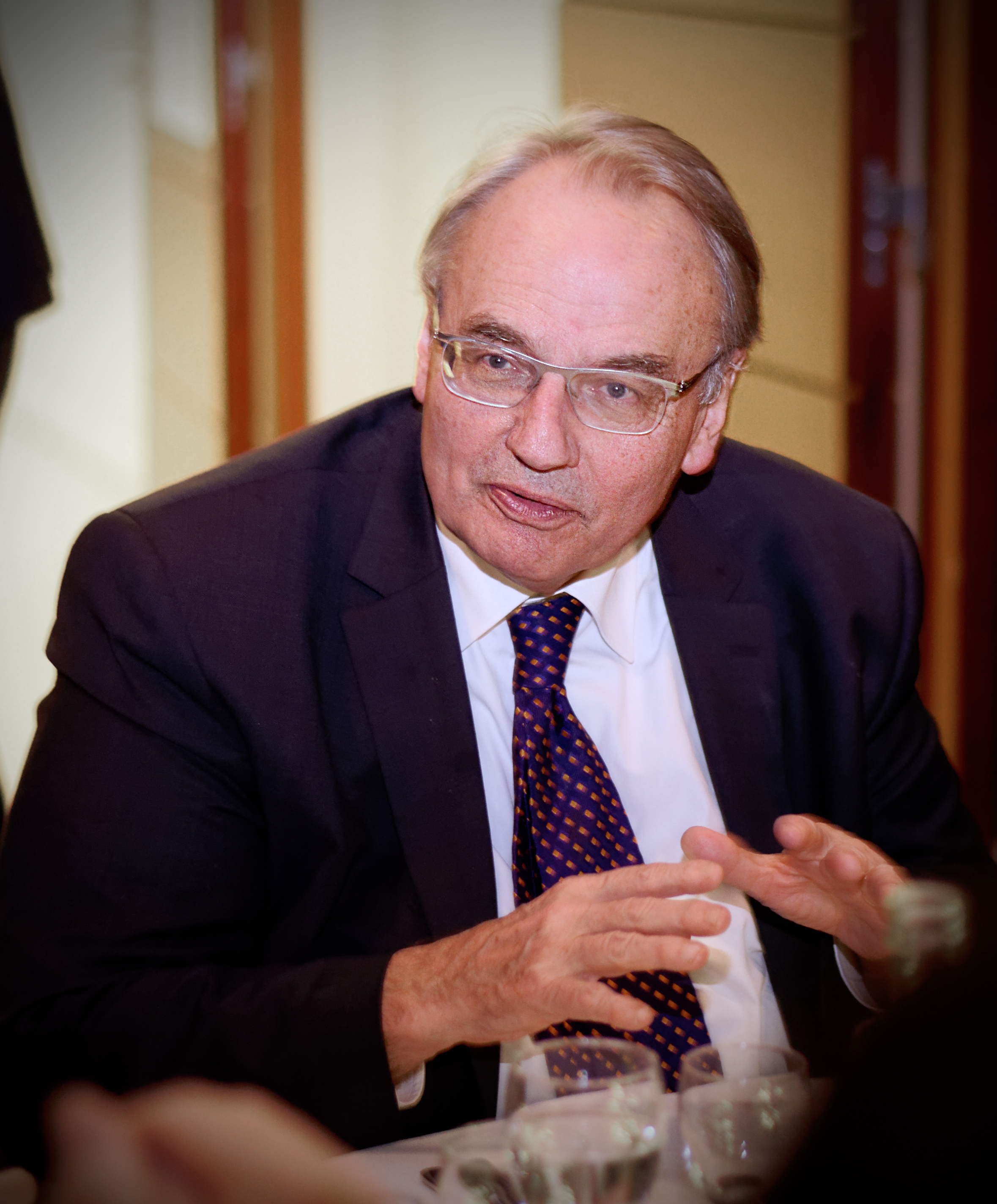
- Bourlanges in 2017

Member of the National Assembly
- In office 21 June 2017 – 9 June 2024
- Parliament: 15th and 16th (Fifth French Republic)
- Election: 18 June 2017; 19 June 2022
- Preceded by: Jean-Marc Germain
- Parliamentary group: MoDem (2017-2020); MDDA (2020-2022); DEM (2022-2024)
- Constituency: Hauts-de-Seine's 12th constituency

President of the Foreign Affairs Committee of the National Assembly
- In office 27 January 2021 – 9 June 2024
- Election: 27 January 2021; 30 June 2022
- Preceded by: Marielle de Sarnez

Member of the European Parliament
- In office 25 July 1989 – 31 December 2007
- Parliament: 3rd, 4th, 5th and 6th
- Succeeded by: Brigitte Fouré
- Parliamentary group: EPP
- Constituency: France

President of the European Parliament Committee on Civil Liberties, Justice and Home Affairs
- In office 22 July 2004 – 20 February 2005
- Preceded by: Jorge Hernandez Mollard
- Succeeded by: Jean-Marie Cavada

President of the European Parliament Committee on Budgetary Control
- In office 28 April 1993 – 18 July 1994
- Succeeded by: Alain Lamassoure

Membre of the Regional Council of High Normandy
- In office 21 March 1986 – 20 March 1998

Personal details
- Born: 13 July 1946 (age 80) Neuilly-sur-Seine, France
- Party: Union for French Democracy (until 2007); Democratic Movement (2017–present)
- Education: Sciences Po; École nationale d'administration
- Occupation: Civil servant

Jean-Louis Bourlanges (French pronunciation: [ʒɑ̃ lwi buʁlɑ̃ʒ]; born 13 July 1946) is a French politician who represented the 12th constituency of the Hauts-de-Seine department in the National Assembly from 2017 to 2024. A member of the Democratic Movement (MoDem), he presided over the Committee on Foreign Affairs of the National Assembly from 2021.

Bourlanges previously served as Member of the European Parliament (MEP) from 1989 to 2007. He was elected on the Union for French Democracy (UDF) list and sat with the Alliance of Liberals and Democrats for Europe group.

He is a graduate of the Paris Institute of Political Studies (better known as Sciences Po), where he is currently an associate professor.

== Political career ==
=== Early career in local politics ===
Bourlanges, a graduate of the École nationale d'administration who was appointed an auditor of the Court of Audit in 1979, was a municipal councillor of Dieppe (1983–1989) and regional councillor of Haute-Normandie (1986–1998).

=== Member of the European Parliament, 1989–2007 ===
During his time as a Member of the European Parliament, Bourlanges served on the Committee on Transport and Tourism (1989–1993), the Committee on Budgetary Control (1993–1999), the Committee on Budgets (1994–2002) and the Committee on International Trade (2005–2007), among others. From 2003 until 2004 he chaired the Committee on Civil Liberties, Justice and Home Affairs.

Following the 2004 European elections, Bourlanges was instrumental in establishing the Alliance of Liberals and Democrats for Europe group in the European Parliament. In 2007, he left his parliamentary seat two years before the next elections. He was succeeded in the European Parliament by Brigitte Fouré.

Ahead of the 2007 French presidential election, Bourlanges was a vocal critic of efforts made by the Socialist Party's candidate Ségolène Royal to seek the endorsement of his party, the Union for French Democracy. In the second round of the election, he supported Nicolas Sarkozy of the Union for a Popular Movement.

=== Later career ===
Bourlanges was a regular contributor to the radio broadcast L'Esprit public on France Culture until 2017.

=== Return to politics ===
Following the 2012 French legislative election, Bourlanges supported Jean-Louis Borloo's initiative to establish the new centre-right Union of Democrats and Independents party.

Ahead of the 2017 presidential election, Bourlanges quit his role as a radio commentator and publicly endorsed Emmanuel Macron. He was critical of the Union of Democrats and Independents' support of The Republicans nominee François Fillon.

=== Member of the National Assembly, 2017–present ===
In the 2017 election for the National Assembly, Bourlanges was elected as the Member of Parliament for Hauts-de-Seine's 12th constituency with the support of La République En Marche! as a member of the Democratic Movement.

In Parliament, Bourlanges has since been serving on the Committee on Foreign Affairs and the Committee on European Affairs. From 2017 until 2019, he was also a member of the Finance Committee. Since 2019, she has also been a member of the French delegation to the Franco-German Parliamentary Assembly. In January 2021, Bourlanges was elected to succeed Marielle de Sarnez at the presidency of the Foreign Affairs Committee.

In May 2022, Bourlanges was a notable critic of the appointment of Pap Ndiaye as Education Minister in the government of Prime Minister Élisabeth Borne by President Emmanuel Macron. The following month, he won reelection to a second term in the National Assembly in the 2022 legislative election.

On 1 December 2022, Bourlanges was among the guests invited to the state dinner hosted by U.S. President Joe Biden in honor of President Emmanuel Macron at the White House.

== Other activities ==
- Institut français des relations internationales (Ifri), Member of the Board of Directors
- Jacques Delors Institute, Member of the Advisory Board
- Trilateral Commission, Member of the European Group

== Political positions ==
In July 2019, Bourlanges voted in favour of the French ratification of the European Union's Comprehensive Economic and Trade Agreement (CETA) with Canada.
