= Hauts-de-Seine's 12th constituency =

Constituency of the National Assembly of France

12th constituency of Hauts-de-Seine
- inline Constituency of the National Assembly of France

- Deputy: Jean-Louis Bourlanges; MoDem
- Department: Hauts-de-Seine
- Cantons: Châtillon, Clamart, Fontenay-aux-Roses, Plessis-Robinson
- Registered voters: 89,872

The 12th constituency of the Hauts-de-Seine is a French legislative constituency in the Hauts-de-Seine département. It is represented in the 15th legislature by Jean-Louis Bourlanges of the Democratic Movement.

== Description ==
Hauts-de-Seine's 12th Constituency lies in the south east of the department.

Politically the seat has favoured the right, however it has elected left wing deputies on three occasions; 1967, 1981 and 2012.

== Historic Representation ==
Election	Member	Party
1967	Robert Levol	PCF
1968	Pierre Mazeaud	UDR
1973	Pierre Mazeaud	UDR
1978	Jean Fonteneau	UDF
1981	Georges Le Baill	PS
1986	Proportional representation – no election by constituency	
1988	Jean-Pierre Foucher	UDF
1993	Jean-Pierre Foucher	UDF
1997	Jean-Pierre Foucher	UDF
2002	Philippe Pemezec	RPF
2002	Philippe Pemezec	UMP
2007	Philippe Pemezec	UMP
2008	Jean-Pierre Schosteck	UMP
2012	Jean-Marc Germain	PS
2017	Jean-Louis Bourlanges	MoDem
2022	Jean-Louis Bourlanges	MoDem

== Election results ==
=== 2024 ===
Candidate	Party	Alliance	First round			Second round		
Candidate	Party	Alliance	Votes	%	+/–	Votes	%	+/–
Jean-Didier Berger	LR		26,790	39.43	+26.33	34,455	54.31	N/A
Lounes Adjroud	PS	NFP	26,034	38.32	+8.60	28,985	45.69	+3.22
Christophe Versini	RN		11,610	17.24	+9.40			
Stéphane Legrand	DIV		1,762	2.59	N/A			
Philippe Houplain	REC		736	1.08	-3.42			
Yann Bernard	LO		444	0.65	-0.32			
Guillaume Chinan	DIV		444	0.65	N/A			
Assma Benharkat	DIV		23	0.03	N/A			
Valid votes			67,943	98.28	+0.17	63,440	96.05	+1.47
Blank votes			827	1.20	-0.24	1,909	2.89	-1.09
Null votes			359	0.52	+0.07	703	1.06	-0.38
Turnout			69,129	73.68	+19.02	66,052	70.39	+16.49
Abstentions			24,694	26.32	-19.02	27,781	29.61	-16.49
Registered voters			93,823			93,833		
Source: Ministry of the Interior, Le Monde
Result						LR GAIN FROM MoDem		

=== 2022 ===
Legislative Election 2022: Hauts-de-Seine's 12th constituency
Party	Candidate	Votes	%	±%
MoDem (Ensemble)	Jean-Louis Bourlanges	15,423	30.80	-9.95
LFI (NUPÉS)	Cathy Thomas	14,883	29.72	+7.41
LR (UDC)	Benoit Blot	6,558	13.10	−12.25
RN	Marc Thomas	3,927	7.84	+3.38
UDI (UDC)	Laurent Vastel	2,969	5.93	N/A
REC	Florent Noblet	2,253	4.50	N/A
DVE	Hayat Bakhti	1,524	3.04	N/A
Others	N/A	2,536		
Turnout		51,042	54.66	−0.78
2nd round result
MoDem (Ensemble)	Jean-Louis Bourlanges	27,386	57.53	-0.39
LFI (NUPÉS)	Cathy Thomas	20,221	42.47	N/A
Turnout		47,607	53.90	+9.83
MoDem hold				

=== 2017 ===
Legislative Election 2017: Hauts-de-Seine's 12th constituency
Party	Candidate	Votes	%	±%
MoDem	Jean-Louis Bourlanges	20,978	40.75	+37.25
LR	Philippe Pemezec	13,050	25.35	−14.64
LFI	Madeleine Bahloul	4,893	9.51	N/A
PS	Jean-Marc Germain	4,758	9.24	−27.30
FN	Damien Yvenat	2,295	4.46	−2.00
EELV	Théo Garcia-Badin	1,834	3.56	−1.05
Others	N/A	3,668		
Turnout		51,476	55.44	−6.23
2nd round result
MoDem	Jean-Louis Bourlanges	23,705	57.92	N/A
LR	Philippe Pemezec	17,221	42.08	−7.48
Turnout		40,926	44.07	−17.76
MoDem gain from PS		Swing		

=== 2012 ===
Legislative Election 2012: Hauts-de-Seine's 12th constituency
Party	Candidate	Votes	%	±%
UMP	Philippe Pemezec	22,160	39.99	−6.60
PS	Jean-Marc Germain	20,248	36.54	+6.43
FN	Blanche Doucet	3,580	6.46	+4.14
FG	Jocelyne Le Metayer	3,498	6.31	+3.68
EELV	Francine Bavay	2,554	4.61	+0.72
MoDem	Christian Delom	1,940	3.50	−7.40
Others	N/A	1,438		
Turnout		55,418	61.67	−3.65
2nd round result
PS	Jean-Marc Germain	28,027	50.44	+3.34
UMP	Philippe Pemezec	27,540	49.56	−3.34
Turnout		55,567	61.83	−0.65
PS gain from UMP				

=== 2007 ===
Legislative Election 2007: Hauts-de-Seine's 12th constituency
Party	Candidate	Votes	%	±%
UMP	Philippe Pemezec	25,883	46.59	
PS	Philippe Kaltenbach	16,730	30.11	
MoDem	Christian Delom	6,057	10.90	
LV	Isabelle Chabran	2,159	3.89	
PCF	Ludovic Zanolin	1,460	2.63	
FN	Jean-Pierre Schmitt	1,287	2.32	
Others	N/A	1,984		
Turnout		56,058	65.32	
2nd round result
UMP	Philippe Pemezec	27,719	52.90	
PS	Philippe Kaltenbach	24,682	47.10	
Turnout		53,615	62.48	
UMP hold				

=== 2002 ===
Legislative Election 2002: Hauts-de-Seine's 12th constituency
Party	Candidate	Votes	%	±%
LV	Francine Bavay	15,634	29.84	
RPF	Philippe Pemezec	14,179	27.06	
UMP	Jean-Pierre Foucher*	12,923	24.66	
FN	Alain Le Berre	3,555	6.78	
PCF	Marie Jeanne Chillon	1,793	3.42	
Others	N/A	4,315		
Turnout		53,067	67.69	
2nd round result
RPF	Philippe Pemezec	26,155	53.63	
LV	Francine Bavay	22,617	46.37	
Turnout		50,290	64.14	
RPF gain from UDF				

* Withdrew before the 2nd round

=== 1997 ===
Legislative Election 1997: Hauts-de-Seine's 12th constituency
Party	Candidate	Votes	%	±%
PS	Pascal Buchet	13,780	28.04	
UDF	Jean-Pierre Foucher	11,607	23.62	
RPR	Philippe Pemezec*	8,748	17.80	
FN	Alain Le Berre	5,550	11.29	
DIV	Gaston Peyronneau	3,642	7.41	
LV	Simon Scrive	1,993	4.06	
LO	Robert Larcher	1,240	2.52	
GE	Philippe Germa	1,235	2.51	
Others	N/A	1,353		
Turnout		50,568	67.76	
2nd round result
UDF	Jean-Pierre Foucher	26,016	51.05	
PS	Pascal Buchet	24,945	48.95	
Turnout		53,353	71.69	
UDF hold				

* RPR dissident

== Sources ==
- Official results of French elections from 1998: "Résultats électoraux officiels en France" (in French). Archived from the original on 20 December 2011.
