= Domqueur =

- Commune
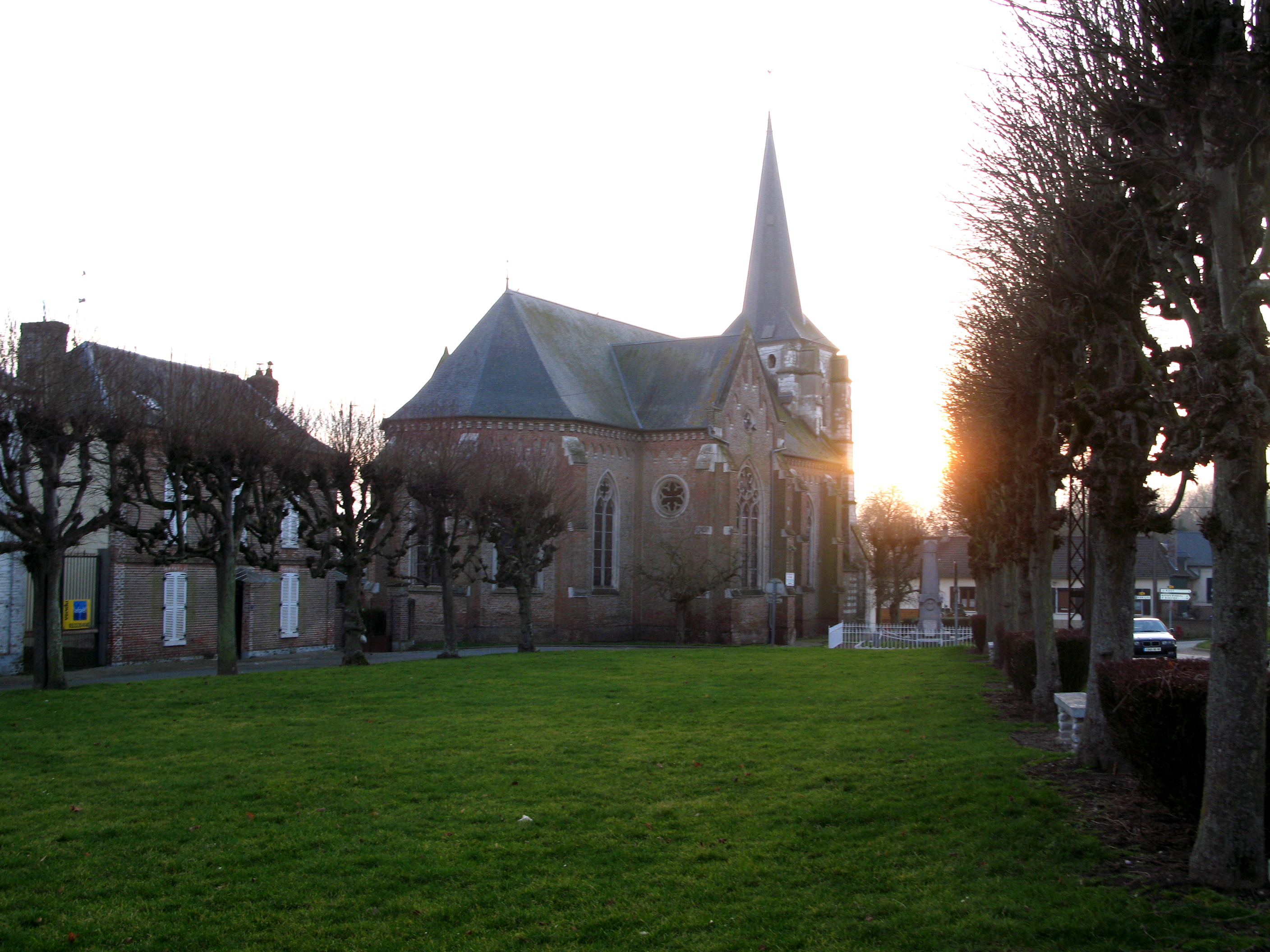
- The church in Domqueur

- Coat of arms
- Location of Domqueur
- Location within France Location within Hauts-de-France
- Coordinates: 50°06′55″N 2°03′39″E
- Country: France
- Region: Hauts-de-France
- Department: Somme
- Arrondissement: Abbeville
- Canton: Rue
- Intercommunality: CC Ponthieu-Marquenterre

Government
  - Mayor (2020–2026): Maïté Beron
- Area^{1}: 8.37 km^{2} (3.23 sq mi)
- Elevation: 90 m (300 ft)
- Highest elevation: 118 m (387 ft)
- Lowest elevation: 63 m (207 ft)
- Population (2023): 308
  - Density: 36.8/km^{2} (95.3/sq mi)
- Time zone: UTC+01:00 (CET)
  - Summer (DST): UTC+02:00 (CEST)
- INSEE/Postal code: 80249 /80620
- ^{1} French Land Register data, which excludes lakes, ponds, glaciers > 1 km^{2} (0.386 sq mi or 247 acres) and river estuaries.

Domqueur (French pronunciation: [dɔ̃kœʁ]; Picard: Dontcheur) is a commune in the Somme department in Hauts-de-France in northern France.

== Geography ==
Domqueur is situated on the D46 and D108 junction, some 15 kilometres (9 mi) north-east of Abbeville. It is surrounded by the communes Gorenflos, Maison-Roland and Ergnies.

== Population ==
Historical population
Year	Pop.	±% p.a.
1968	326	—
1975	276	−2.35%
1982	261	−0.80%
1990	243	−0.89%
1999	262	+0.84%
2007	274	+0.56%
2012	298	+1.69%
2017	311	+0.86%
2023	308	−0.16%
Source: INSEE

== See also ==
- Communes of the Somme department
