= Villers-sous-Ailly =

- Commune
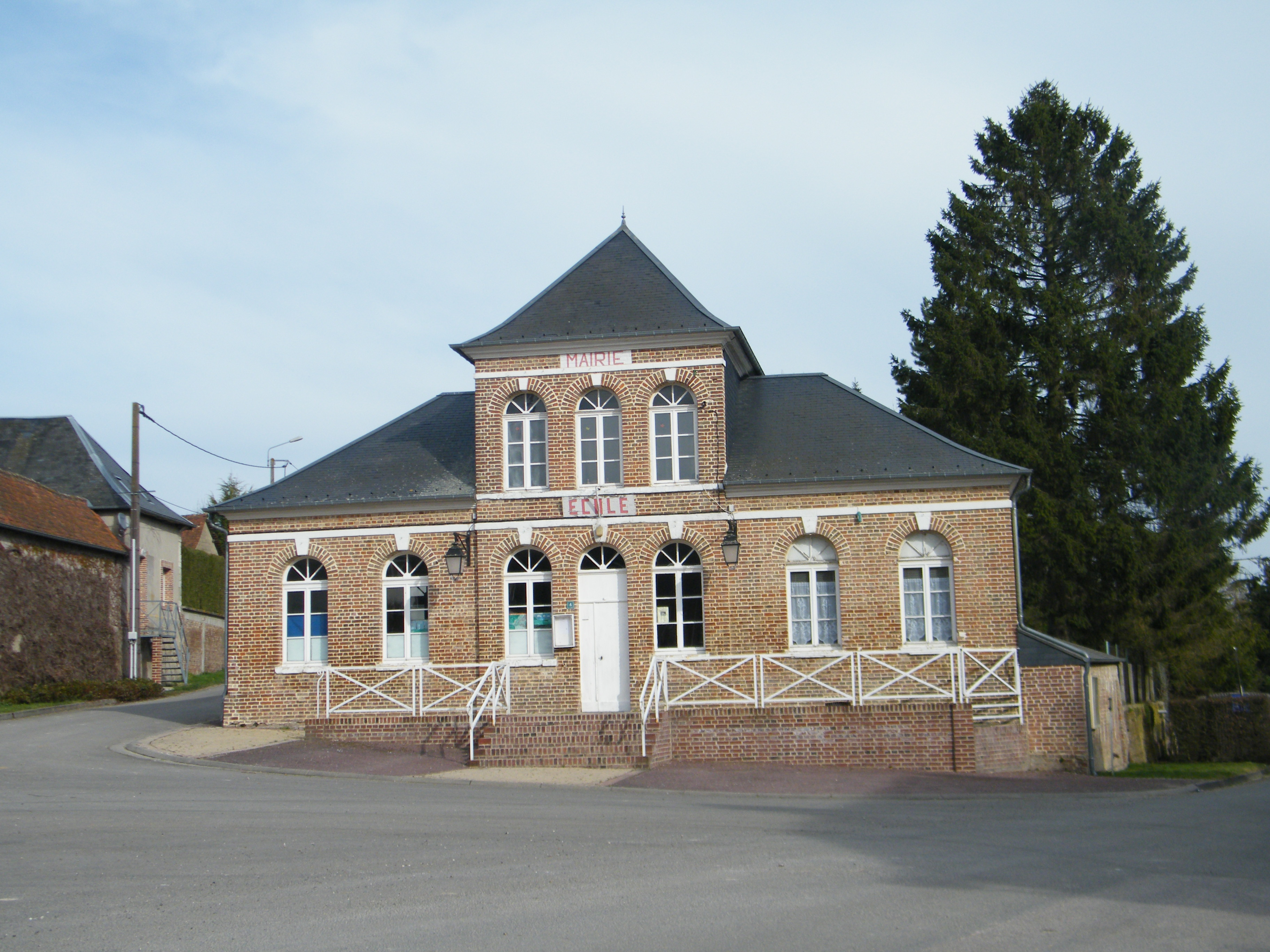
- The town hall and school in Villers-sous-Ailly
- Location of Villers-sous-Ailly
- Location within France Location within Hauts-de-France
- Coordinates: 50°03′44″N 2°01′03″E
- Country: France
- Region: Hauts-de-France
- Department: Somme
- Arrondissement: Abbeville
- Canton: Rue
- Intercommunality: CC Ponthieu-Marquenterre

Government
  - Mayor (2020–2026): Laurent Sauvage
- Area^{1}: 6.26 km^{2} (2.42 sq mi)
- Elevation: 80 m (260 ft)
- Highest elevation: 112 m (367 ft)
- Lowest elevation: 40 m (130 ft)
- Population (2023): 167
  - Density: 26.7/km^{2} (69.1/sq mi)
- Time zone: UTC+01:00 (CET)
  - Summer (DST): UTC+02:00 (CEST)
- INSEE/Postal code: 80804 /80690
- ^{1} French Land Register data, which excludes lakes, ponds, glaciers > 1 km^{2} (0.386 sq mi or 247 acres) and river estuaries.

Villers-sous-Ailly (French pronunciation: [vilɛʁ su.z‿aji], literally Villers under Ailly) is a commune in the Somme department in Hauts-de-France in northern France.

== Geography ==
The commune is situated 8 miles(12 km) southeast of Abbeville, on the D237 road.

== Population ==
Historical population
Year	Pop.	±% p.a.
1968	143	—
1975	109	−3.80%
1982	122	+1.62%
1990	146	+2.27%
1999	146	+0.00%
2007	180	+2.65%
2012	189	+0.98%
2017	181	−0.86%
2023	167	−1.33%
Source: INSEE

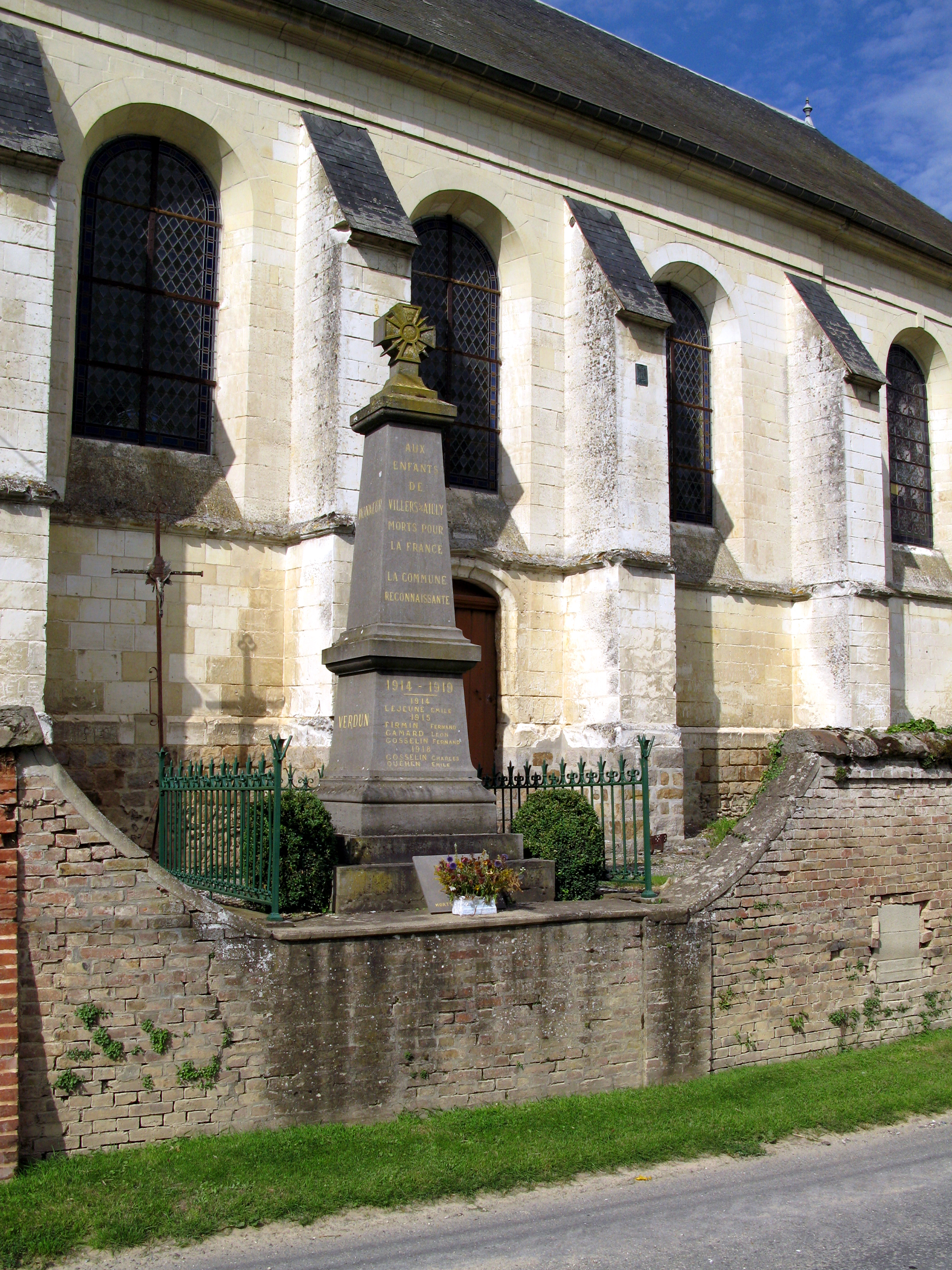
The war memorial next to the church

== See also ==
- Communes of the Somme department
