= Dominois =

- Commune
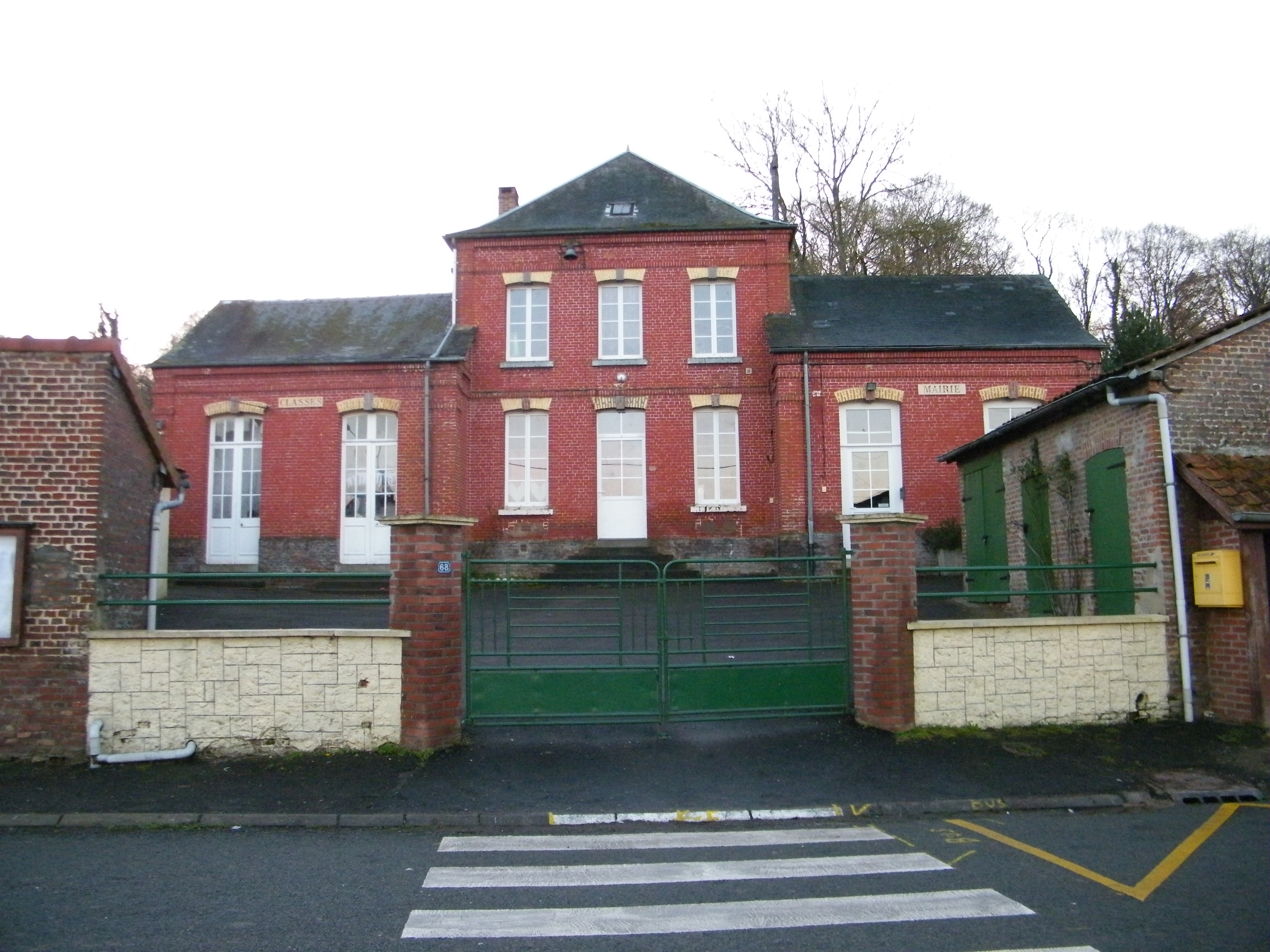
- The town hall in Dominois

- Coat of arms
- Location of Dominois
- Location within France Location within Hauts-de-France
- Coordinates: 50°19′56″N 1°51′12″E
- Country: France
- Region: Hauts-de-France
- Department: Somme
- Arrondissement: Abbeville
- Canton: Rue
- Intercommunality: CC Ponthieu-Marquenterre

Government
  - Mayor (2020–2026): Jean-Louis Labry
- Area^{1}: 6.15 km^{2} (2.37 sq mi)
- Elevation: 13 m (43 ft)
- Highest elevation: 74 m (243 ft)
- Lowest elevation: 7 m (23 ft)
- Population (2023): 168
  - Density: 27.3/km^{2} (70.8/sq mi)
- Time zone: UTC+01:00 (CET)
  - Summer (DST): UTC+02:00 (CEST)
- INSEE/Postal code: 80244 /80120
- ^{1} French Land Register data, which excludes lakes, ponds, glaciers > 1 km^{2} (0.386 sq mi or 247 acres) and river estuaries.

Dominois (French pronunciation: [dɔminwa]; Picard: Domino ) is a commune in the Somme department in Hauts-de-France in northern France.

== Geography ==
Dominois is situated on the D192 road, on the banks of the river Authie, the border with Pas-de-Calais, some 20 miles (32 km) north of Abbeville.

== Population ==
Historical population
Year	Pop.	±% p.a.
1968	209	—
1975	201	−0.56%
1982	183	−1.33%
1990	169	−0.99%
1999	141	−1.99%
2007	149	+0.69%
2012	203	+6.38%
2017	177	−2.70%
2023	168	−0.87%
Source: INSEE

== See also ==
- Communes of the Somme department
