= Cocquerel =

- Commune
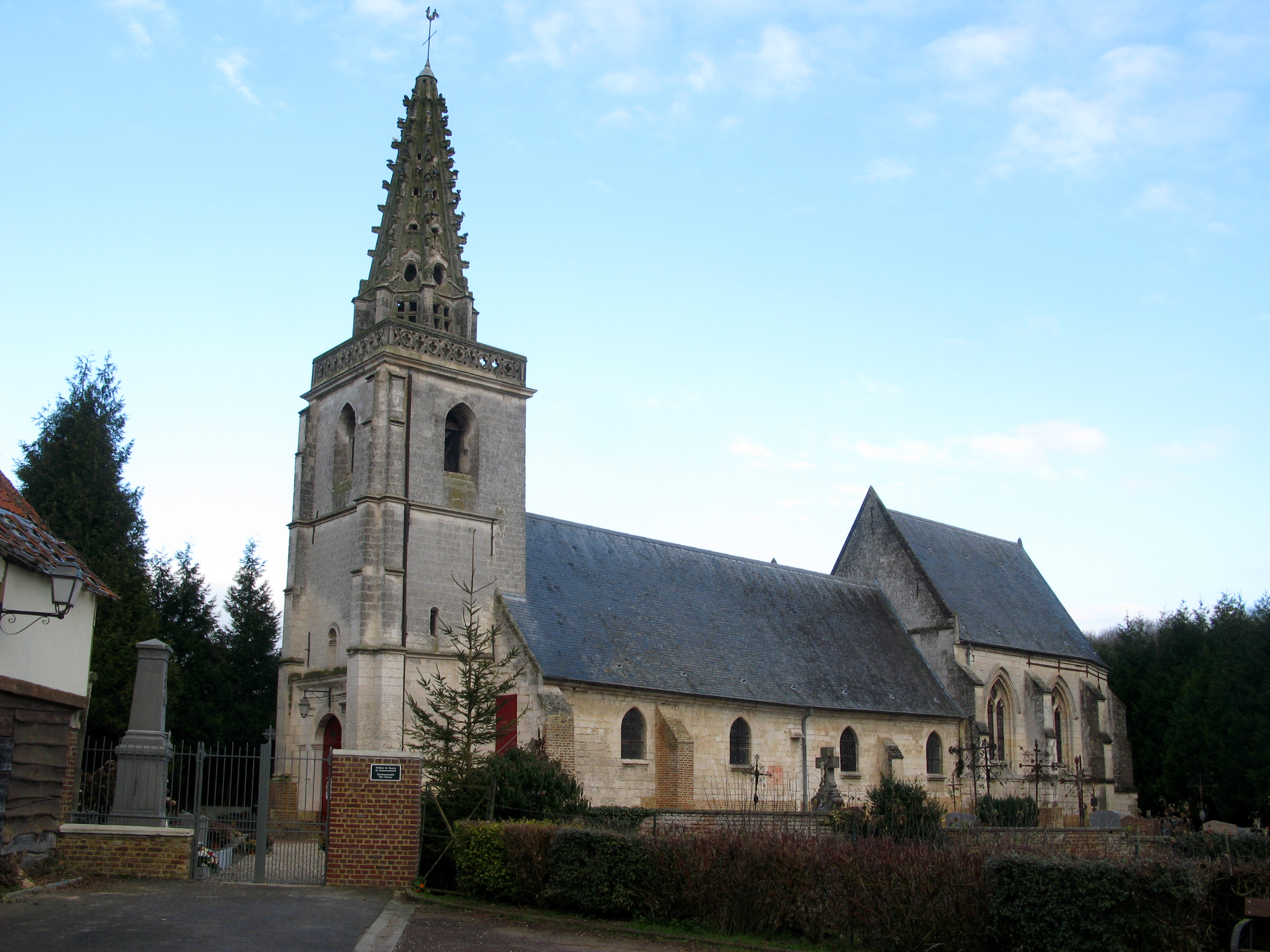
- The church in Cocquerel

- Coat of arms
- Location of Cocquerel
- Location within France Location within Hauts-de-France
- Coordinates: 50°02′39″N 1°57′00″E
- Country: France
- Region: Hauts-de-France
- Department: Somme
- Arrondissement: Abbeville
- Canton: Rue
- Intercommunality: CC Ponthieu-Marquenterre

Government
  - Mayor (2020–2026): Maurice Crépin
- Area^{1}: 9.54 km^{2} (3.68 sq mi)
- Elevation: 13 m (43 ft)
- Highest elevation: 113 m (371 ft)
- Lowest elevation: 7 m (23 ft)
- Population (2023): 220
  - Density: 23/km^{2} (60/sq mi)
- Time zone: UTC+01:00 (CET)
  - Summer (DST): UTC+02:00 (CEST)
- INSEE/Postal code: 80200 /80510
- ^{1} French Land Register data, which excludes lakes, ponds, glaciers > 1 km^{2} (0.386 sq mi or 247 acres) and river estuaries.

Cocquerel (French pronunciation: [kɔkʁɛl]; Picard: Cocré) is a commune in the Somme department in Hauts-de-France in northern France.

== Geography ==
Cocquerel is situated on the D112, on the banks of the river Somme, some 7 miles (11 km) southeast of Abbeville.

== Towns Nearby ==
The following diagram shows the towns nearby with in a 2.3 mi (3.7 km) radius.

Distances and relative position of some populations

== Population ==
Historical population
Year	Pop.	±% p.a.
1968	138	—
1975	117	−2.33%
1982	114	−0.37%
1990	141	+2.69%
1999	172	+2.23%
2007	202	+2.03%
2012	226	+2.27%
2017	229	+0.26%
2023	220	−0.67%
Source: INSEE

== Personalities ==
Gilles de Robien, politician, Mayor of Amiens and a former national Minister of education.

== See also ==
- Communes of the Somme department
