= Bussus-Bussuel =

- Part of Bussus-lès-Yaucourt
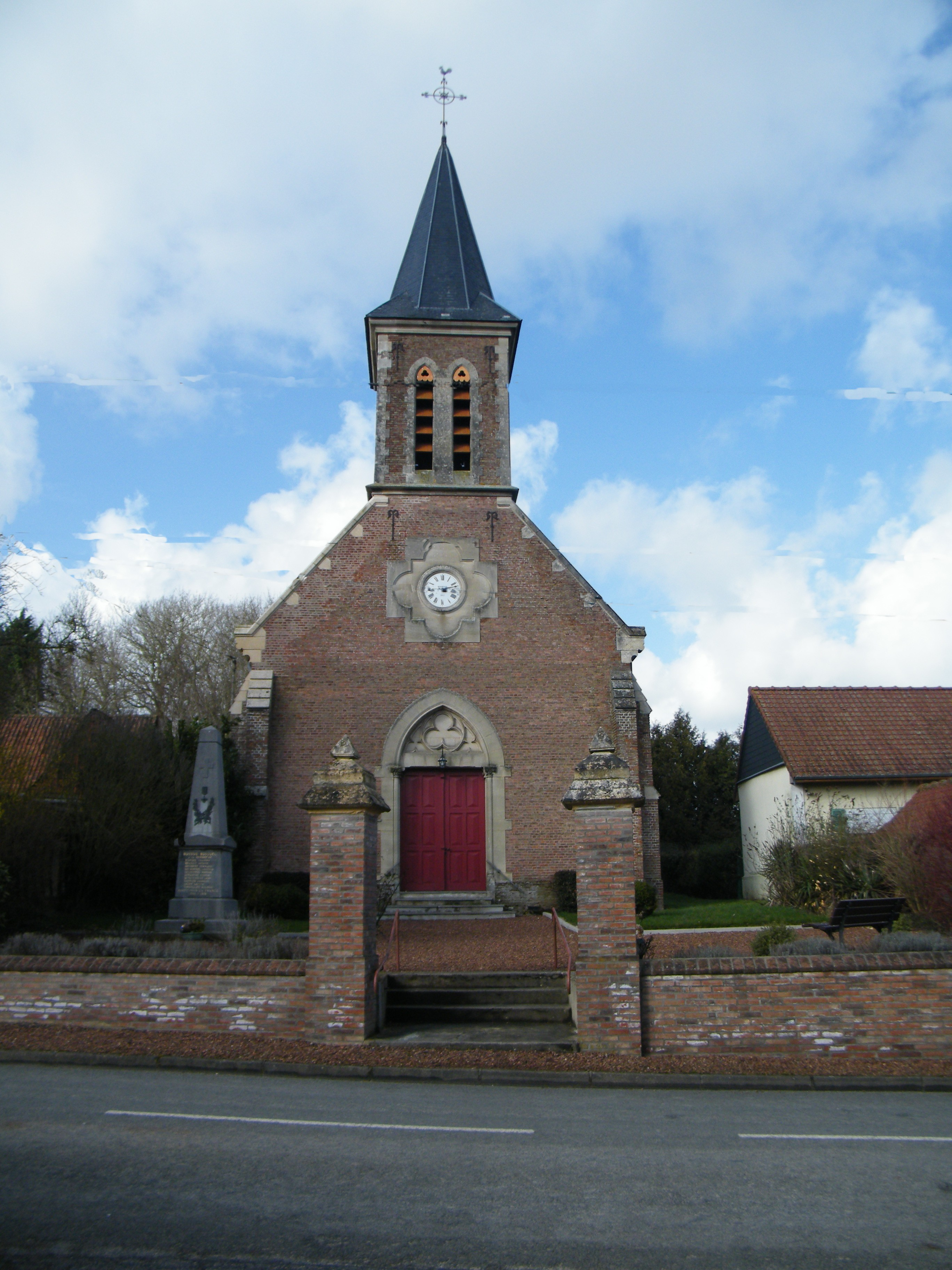
- The church in Bussus
- Location of Bussus-Bussuel
- Location within France Location within Hauts-de-France
- Coordinates: 50°06′38″N 2°00′02″E
- Country: France
- Region: Hauts-de-France
- Department: Somme
- Arrondissement: Abbeville
- Canton: Rue
- Commune: Bussus-lès-Yaucourt
- Area^{1}: 8.16 km^{2} (3.15 sq mi)
- Elevation: 42 m (138 ft)
- Highest elevation: 112 m (367 ft)
- Lowest elevation: 47 m (154 ft)
- Population (2022): 306
  - Density: 37.5/km^{2} (97.1/sq mi)
- Time zone: UTC+01:00 (CET)
  - Summer (DST): UTC+02:00 (CEST)
- Postal code: 80135
- ^{1} French Land Register data, which excludes lakes, ponds, glaciers > 1 km^{2} (0.386 sq mi or 247 acres) and river estuaries.

Bussus-Bussuel (Picard: Buchu-Buchuel) is a former commune in the Somme department in Hauts-de-France in northern France. On 1 January 2025, it was merged into the new commune of Bussus-lès-Yaucourt.

== Geography ==
The commune is situated on the D153 road, 11 km (7 mi) east of Abbeville.

== Population ==
Historical population
Year	Pop.	±% p.a.
1968	248	—
1975	220	−1.70%
1982	221	+0.06%
1990	223	+0.11%
1999	247	+1.14%
2007	268	+1.03%
2012	317	+3.42%
2017	297	−1.29%
Source: INSEE

== See also ==
- Communes of the Somme department
