= Yaucourt-Bussus =

- Part of Bussus-lès-Yaucourt
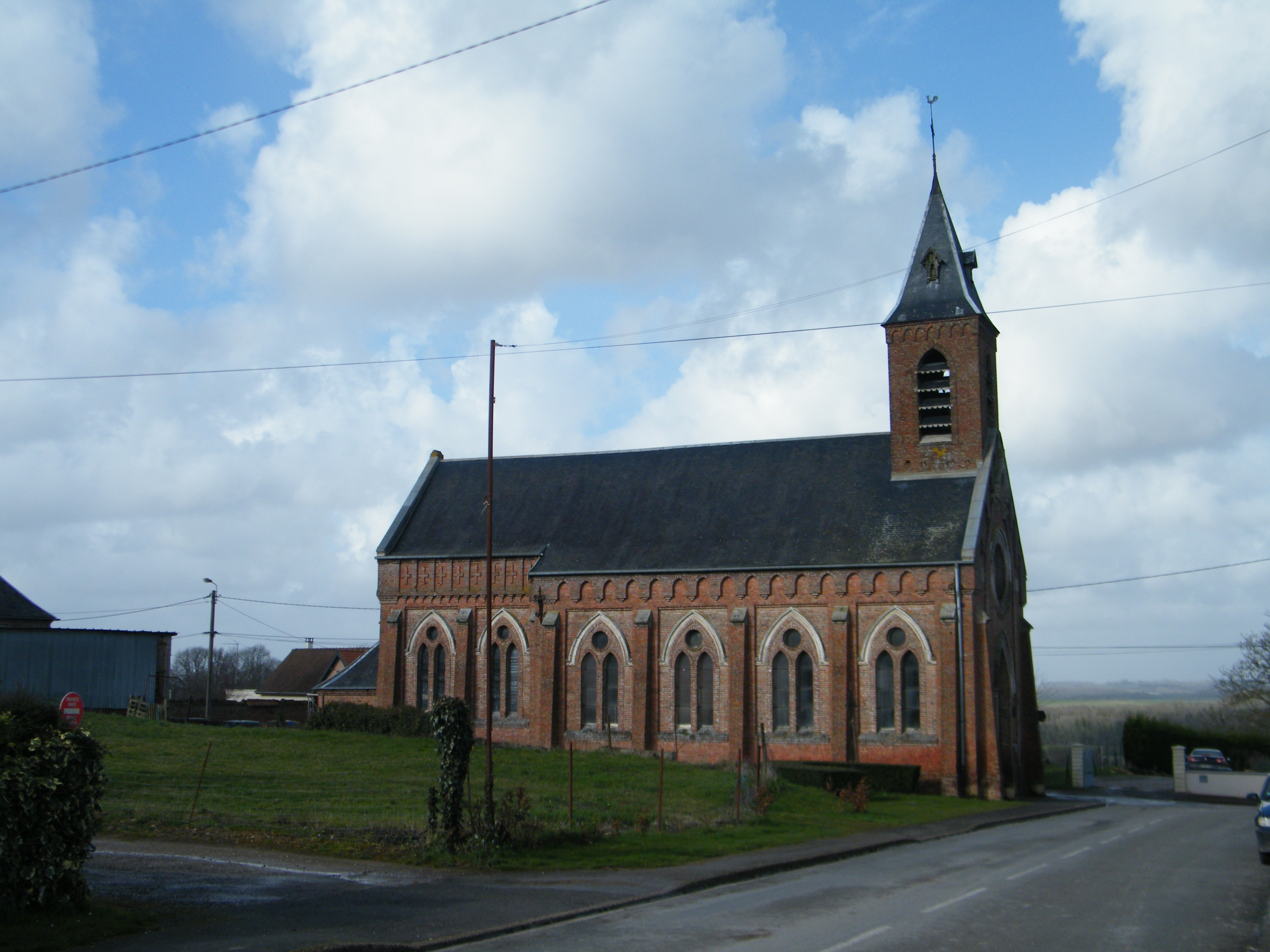
- The church in Yaucourt

- Coat of arms
- Location of Yaucourt-Bussus
- Location within France Location within Hauts-de-France
- Coordinates: 50°06′16″N 1°58′39″E
- Country: France
- Region: Hauts-de-France
- Department: Somme
- Arrondissement: Abbeville
- Canton: Rue
- Commune: Bussus-lès-Yaucourt
- Area^{1}: 7.03 km^{2} (2.71 sq mi)
- Elevation: 80 m (260 ft)
- Highest elevation: 112 m (367 ft)
- Lowest elevation: 35 m (115 ft)
- Population (2022): 247
  - Density: 35.1/km^{2} (91.0/sq mi)
- Time zone: UTC+01:00 (CET)
  - Summer (DST): UTC+02:00 (CEST)
- Postal code: 80135
- ^{1} French Land Register data, which excludes lakes, ponds, glaciers > 1 km^{2} (0.386 sq mi or 247 acres) and river estuaries.

Yaucourt-Bussus is a former commune in the Somme department in Hauts-de-France in northern France. On 1 January 2025, it was merged into the new commune of Bussus-lès-Yaucourt.

== Geography ==
The commune is situated 8 kilometres (5 mi) east of Abbeville, on the D153 road

== Population ==
Historical population
Year	Pop.	±% p.a.
1968	124	—
1975	129	+0.57%
1982	121	−0.91%
1990	146	+2.38%
1999	175	+2.03%
2007	226	+3.25%
2012	215	−0.99%
2017	244	+2.56%
Source: INSEE

== See also ==
- Communes of the Somme department
