= Long, Somme =

Long
- Commune
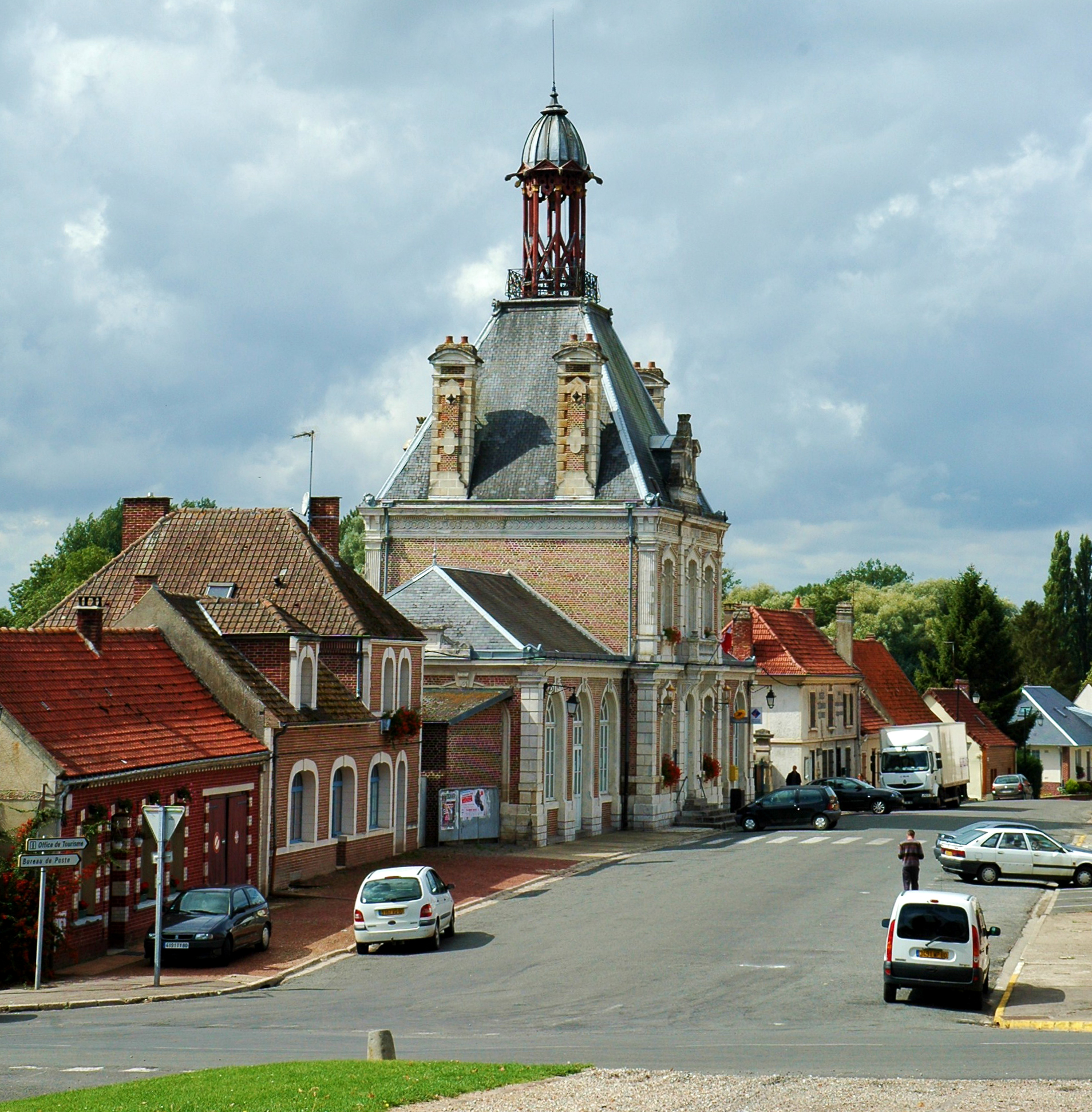
- The town hall in Long

- Coat of arms
- Location of Long
- Location within France Location within Hauts-de-France
- Coordinates: 50°02′24″N 1°58′55″E
- Country: France
- Region: Hauts-de-France
- Department: Somme
- Arrondissement: Abbeville
- Canton: Rue
- Intercommunality: CC Ponthieu-Marquenterre

Government
  - Mayor (2020–2026): Jean-Marie Pecquet
- Area^{1}: 9.19 km^{2} (3.55 sq mi)
- Elevation: 104 m (341 ft)
- Highest elevation: 111 m (364 ft)
- Lowest elevation: 6 m (20 ft)
- Population (2023): 590
  - Density: 64/km^{2} (170/sq mi)
- Time zone: UTC+01:00 (CET)
  - Summer (DST): UTC+02:00 (CEST)
- INSEE/Postal code: 80486 /80510
- ^{1} French Land Register data, which excludes lakes, ponds, glaciers > 1 km^{2} (0.386 sq mi or 247 acres) and river estuaries.

Long (French pronunciation: [lɔ̃]) is a commune in the Somme department in Hauts-de-France in northern France.

== Geography ==
Long is situated on the D32 and the D112 crossroads, some 10 miles (16 km) southeast of Abbeville in a part of the valley of the Somme that is filled by lakes and ponds.

== Population ==
Historical population
| Year | Pop. | ±% p.a. |
|---|---|---|
| 1968 | 648 | — |
| 1975 | 606 | −0.95% |
| 1982 | 574 | −0.77% |
| 1990 | 575 | +0.02% |
| 1999 | 624 | +0.91% |
| 2007 | 658 | +0.67% |
| 2012 | 640 | −0.55% |
| 2017 | 621 | −0.60% |
| 2023 | 590 | −0.85% |
Source: INSEE

== Places of interest ==
=== Church of St. Jean-Baptiste ===
The first church was built here in the 12th century and must have been quite small compared to the present-day building. Another church replaced the original in the 15th century. During the 19th century, as the population of the town had grown to 1800 people, another church had to be built, though the bell-tower of the original was incorporated within the new building, which was completed in 1851.

=== The hydro-electric plant ===
In 1900, the municipal council decided to build an electricity generating plant, powered by the waters of the Somme. Inaugurated three years later on 7 June 1903, the three turbines provided electricity at 120 volts DC for the entire village, at little charge. It also provided running water to every home too.
By 1968, the world had caught up and overtaken the generators at Long. A 220volt supply from the national grid ( and, for the first time, electricity bills ) arrived in the commune. The plant continued to pump water until 1974. The building now houses a museum.

=== The Château at Long ===
The 18th-century château, in pink brick and white stone, with a mansard roof, was built on the site of an earlier medieval castle.
During the Second World War, the building was badly damaged by occupying troops, who burnt doors, windows and flooring.
Lovingly restored during the 1960s, the building is now open to the public.

== See also ==
- Communes of the Somme department
