= Maison-Roland =

- Commune
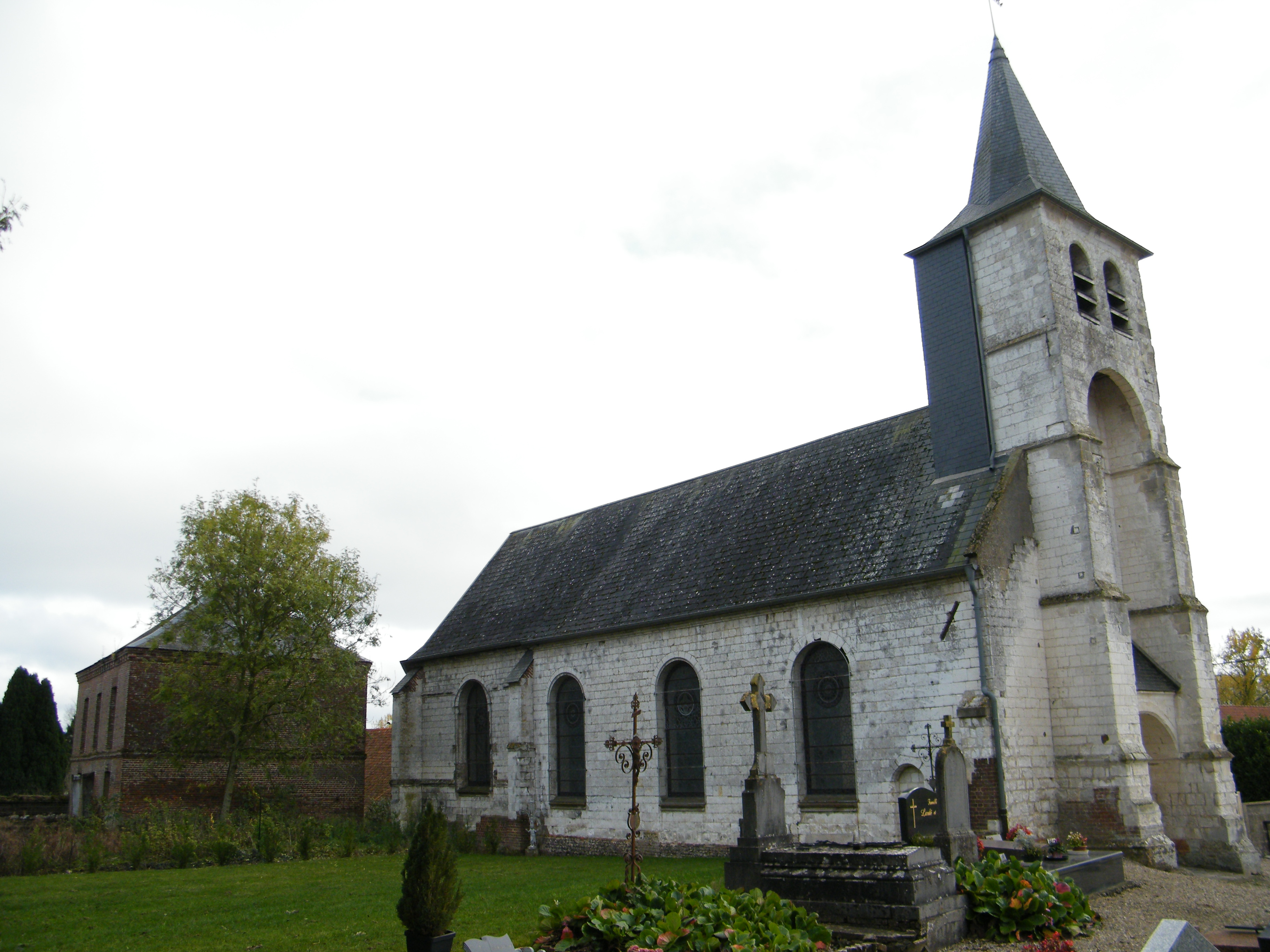
- The church in Maison-Roland

- Coat of arms
- Location of Maison-Roland
- Location within France Location within Hauts-de-France
- Coordinates: 50°07′45″N 2°01′21″E
- Country: France
- Region: Hauts-de-France
- Department: Somme
- Arrondissement: Abbeville
- Canton: Rue
- Intercommunality: CC Ponthieu-Marquenterre

Government
  - Mayor (2020–2026): Murielle Dulary
- Area^{1}: 4.91 km^{2} (1.90 sq mi)
- Elevation: 129 m (423 ft)
- Highest elevation: 123 m (404 ft)
- Lowest elevation: 63 m (207 ft)
- Population (2023): 97
  - Density: 20/km^{2} (51/sq mi)
- Time zone: UTC+01:00 (CET)
  - Summer (DST): UTC+02:00 (CEST)
- INSEE/Postal code: 80502 /80135
- ^{1} French Land Register data, which excludes lakes, ponds, glaciers > 1 km^{2} (0.386 sq mi or 247 acres) and river estuaries.

Maison-Roland (French pronunciation: [mɛzɔ̃ ʁɔlɑ̃]) is a commune in the Somme department in Hauts-de-France in northern France.

== Geography ==
The commune is situated on the D108e road, some 11 miles (18 km) east-northeast of Abbeville.

== Population ==
Historical population
Year	Pop.	±% p.a.
1968	156	—
1975	145	−1.04%
1982	141	−0.40%
1990	128	−1.20%
1999	109	−1.77%
2007	112	+0.34%
2012	120	+1.39%
2017	106	−2.45%
2023	97	−1.47%
Source: INSEE

== Places of interest ==
- The church at Maison-Roland

== See also ==
- Communes of the Somme department
