= Ailly-le-Haut-Clocher =

Commune in Hauts-de-France, France

- Commune
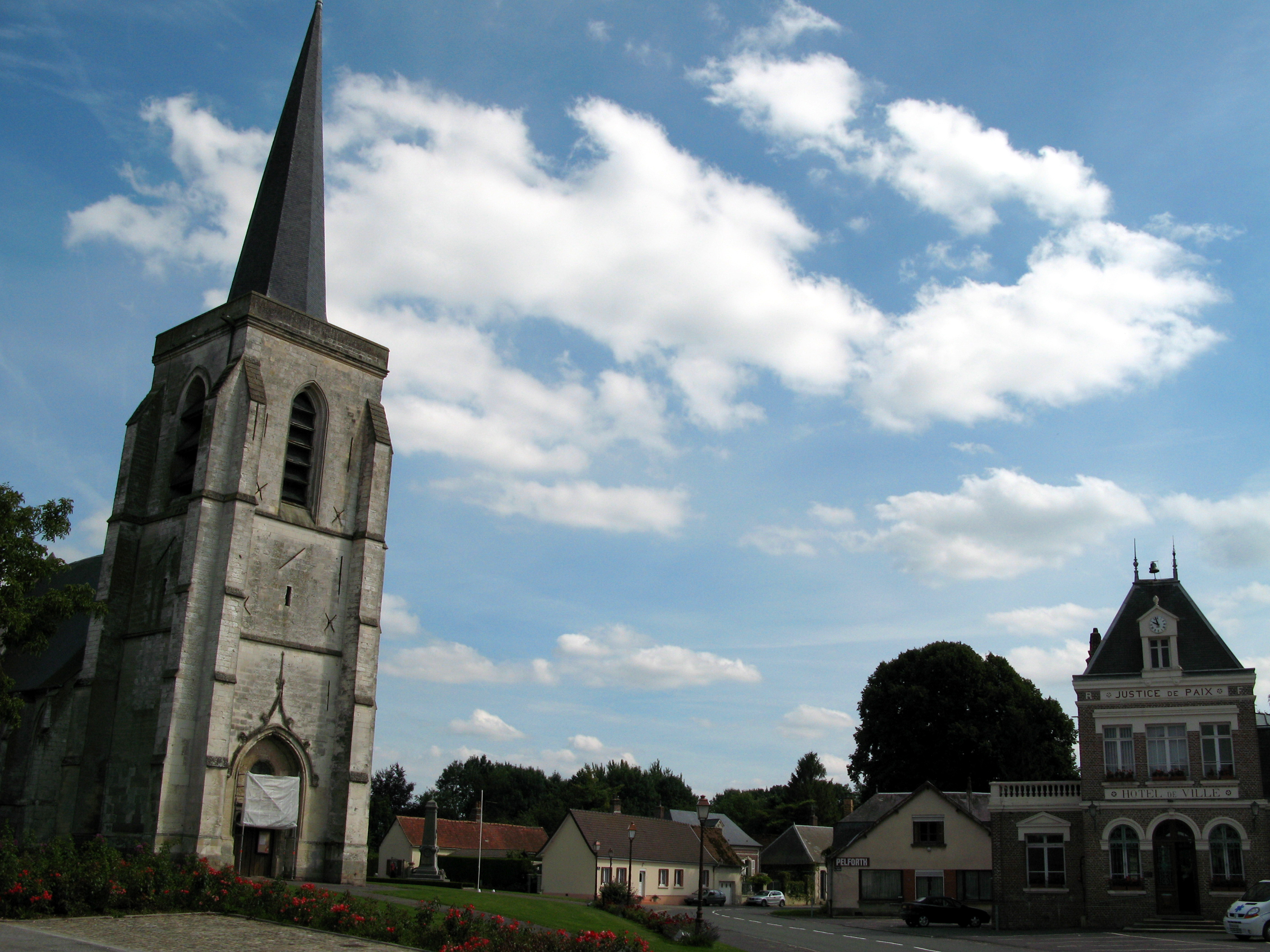
- The main square

- Coat of arms
- Location of Ailly-le-Haut-Clocher
- Location within France Location within Hauts-de-France
- Coordinates: 50°04′43″N 1°59′46″E
- Country: France
- Region: Hauts-de-France
- Department: Somme
- Arrondissement: Abbeville
- Canton: Rue
- Intercommunality: Ponthieu-Marquenterre

Government
  - Mayor (2024–2026): Bruno Balesdent
- Area^{1}: 10.81 km^{2} (4.17 sq mi)
- Elevation: 107 m (351 ft)
- Highest elevation: 115 m (377 ft)
- Lowest elevation: 72 m (236 ft)
- Population (2023): 1,024
  - Density: 94.73/km^{2} (245.3/sq mi)
- Time zone: UTC+01:00 (CET)
  - Summer (DST): UTC+02:00 (CEST)
- INSEE/Postal code: 80009 /80690
- ^{1} French Land Register data, which excludes lakes, ponds, glaciers > 1 km^{2} (0.386 sq mi or 247 acres) and river estuaries.

Ailly-le-Haut-Clocher (Picard: Ailly-echl-heut-clotcher) is a commune in the Somme department in Hauts-de-France in northern France.

== Geography ==
The commune liest about 25 km (16 mi) southwest of Abbeville, at the junction of the national road N1 and the departmental road D32. Part of the old region of Ponthieu, the town is situated on a large plateau. Only the slightest undulation of the land is noticeable. 3 neighbourhoods can be distinguished: Ailly (the "centre") and the former hamlets of Famechon and Alliel.

== History ==
The place name Ailly comes from the name "Alius", a Gallo-Roman, whose farm was located at the site of the present cemetery, on the national road. Aerial photography can pick out the farm boundaries. “Haut-Clocher” refers to the “high steeple”, because of the arrow-shaped characteristic of the church spire, that was used as an observation and triangulation point by the cartographers in charge of creating the Cassini maps of France in 1760.

- Ailly’s former names were: Asliacum, Alliacus, Aliacus and Ally.
- A place known as the “Three Cities”, between Ailly and Famechon, is believed to have been a Gallo-Roman cemetery, where stone axes, stone coffins containing skeletons and medallions have been found.
- In 831, Ailly belonged to the abbey of Saint Riquier.
- Four fiefdoms were created at Ailly: one held by Nicolas Deroussen, another by Jean Maye, a third one held by J. Belleborgue and the other by François de Bacouel.
- In 1500, Catherine de Fosseux, married Robert d’Ococh,
- Ailly was sold to Josse of Beauvarlet, mayor of Abbeville.
- In 1546, the church was burnt down by marauders. 130 inhabitants that had taken refuge in the building were killed. The leader of the arsonists was himself burned at the stake at Abbeville on 16 July 1546. 10 years later, the new arrow spire was constructed by François Glassant, carpenter.
- In 1615, Ailly was ravaged by the troops of the Maréchal d'Ancre (who was later murdered on 25 April 1617).
- In 1639, War against Spain, Ailly was pillaged by French troops of Charles de La Porte.
- During September 1849, Victor Hugo passed through the town. He noted that there were few signs of cholera.
- Freak hailstorms devastated the town in 1885.

== Places and monuments ==
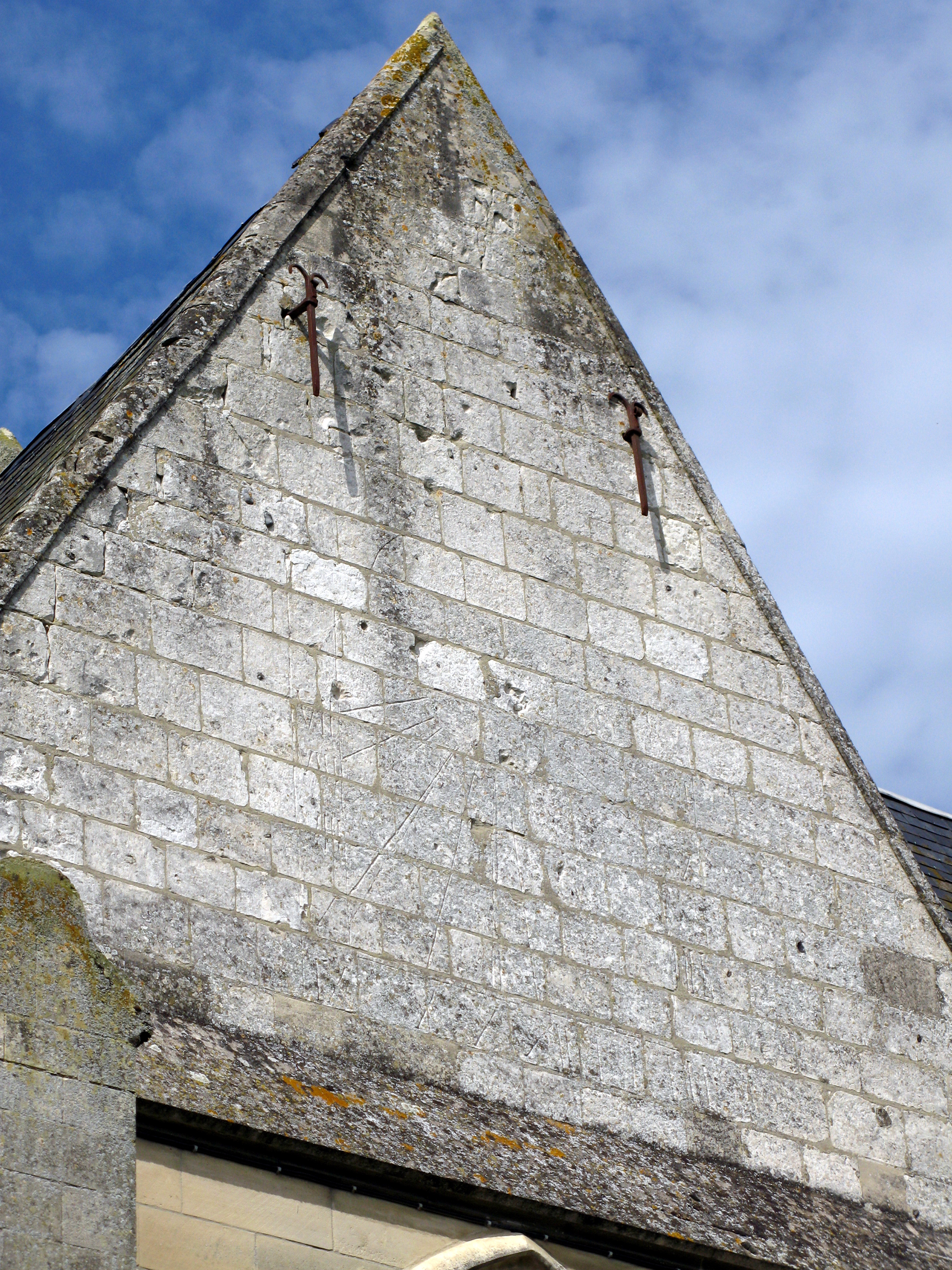
The fading sundial

- Notre-Dame de l'Assomption church: Classified historic monument, dating back to the 13th century. The sundial on the south facing wall of the structure, is not very visible except in favorable conditions, such as at the end of a sunny day.
- Monument to the dead: Erected just to the south of the church.

== People ==
- Pierre d'Ailly, bishop of Cambrai and cardinal of Rome, was a native of Ailly. He was the Convenor of the Council of Constance, which resolved the Great Papal Schism of 1378-1417.
- John-Baptiste Honoré Deroussen, Lawyer to Parliament (1748–1804).
- Ernest Deroussen, Army infantry officer, killed in the assault on the Malakoff Tower at Sebastopol, decorated with the Legion of Honour.

== Facilities and economical life ==
The town has a primary school, a high school and is equipped with several athletic facilities. Because this rural town is located on the roads serving Abbeville and Amiens, many locals work outside their community. In the 1930s, a factory making buttons of mother-of-pearl employed many Alliciens. Nowadays, economical life is reduced to two endive producers, mixed farming and a few craftsmen.

== Population ==
Historical population
Year	Pop.	±% p.a.
1968	757	—
1975	778	+0.39%
1982	801	+0.42%
1990	809	+0.12%
1999	831	+0.30%
2007	862	+0.46%
2012	921	+1.33%
2017	966	+0.96%
2023	1,024	+0.98%
Source: INSEE

== See also ==
- Communes of the Somme department
