= Ergnies =

- Commune
- Location of Ergnies
- Location within France Location within Hauts-de-France
- Coordinates: 50°05′12″N 2°02′18″E
- Country: France
- Region: Hauts-de-France
- Department: Somme
- Arrondissement: Abbeville
- Canton: Rue
- Intercommunality: CC Ponthieu-Marquenterre

Government
  - Mayor (2020–2026): Damien Briet
- Area^{1}: 1.96 km^{2} (0.76 sq mi)
- Elevation: 105 m (344 ft)
- Highest elevation: 117 m (384 ft)
- Lowest elevation: 84 m (276 ft)
- Population (2023): 159
  - Density: 81.1/km^{2} (210/sq mi)
- Time zone: UTC+01:00 (CET)
  - Summer (DST): UTC+02:00 (CEST)
- INSEE/Postal code: 80281 /80690
- ^{1} French Land Register data, which excludes lakes, ponds, glaciers > 1 km^{2} (0.386 sq mi or 247 acres) and river estuaries.

Ergnies (French pronunciation: [ɛʁɲi]; Picard: Arni ) is a commune in the Somme department in Hauts-de-France in northern France.

== Geography ==
Ergnies is situated on the D46 road, some 16 km (10 mi) east of Abbeville.

== Population ==
Historical population
Year	Pop.	±% p.a.
1968	93	—
1975	88	−0.79%
1982	99	+1.70%
1990	114	+1.78%
1999	152	+3.25%
2007	193	+3.03%
2012	196	+0.31%
2017	180	−1.69%
2023	159	−2.05%
Source: INSEE

== See also ==
- Communes of the Somme department
