= Conteville, Somme =

Conteville
- Commune
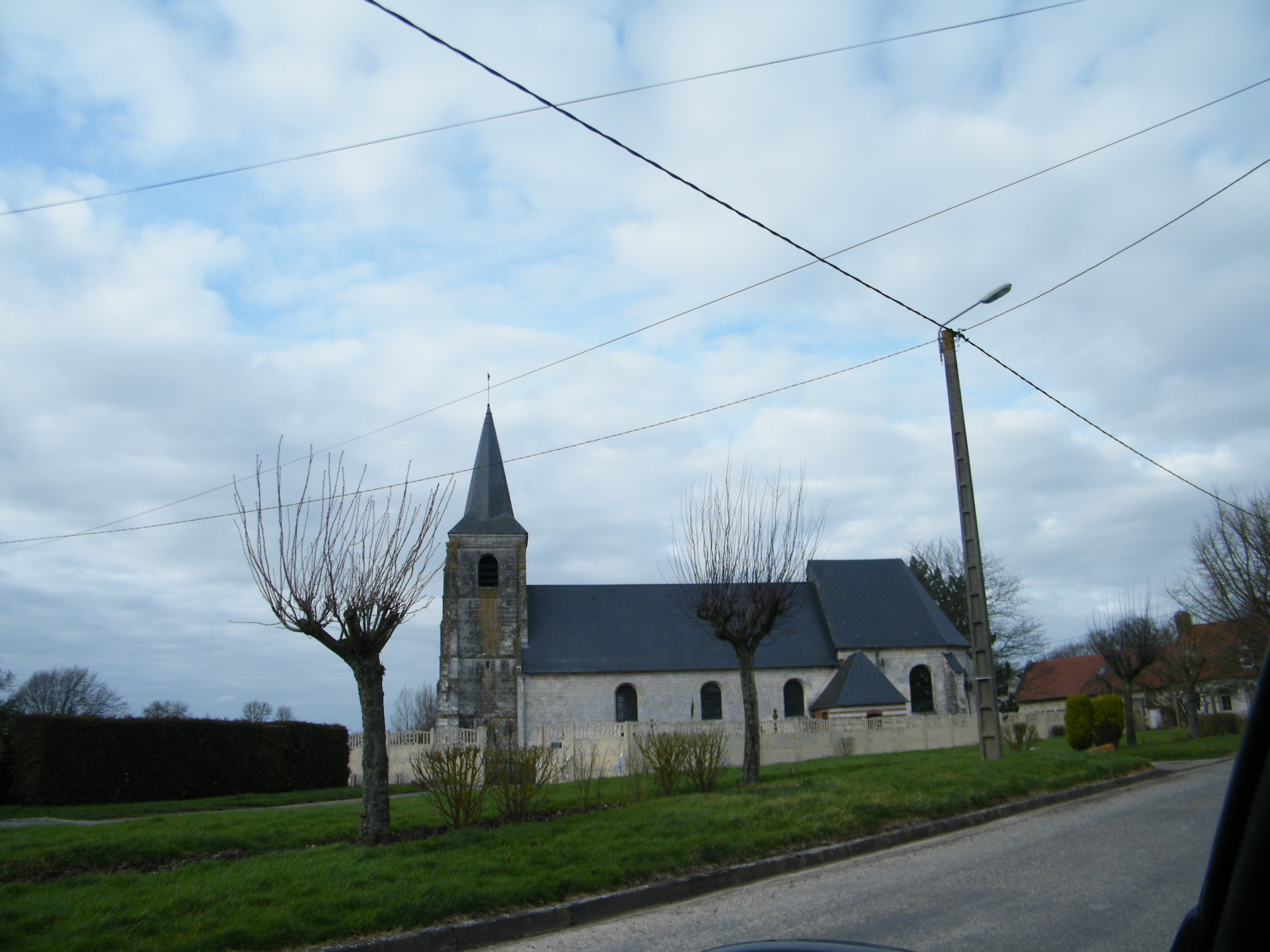
- The church in Conteville
- Location of Conteville
- Location within France Location within Hauts-de-France
- Coordinates: 50°10′45″N 2°04′33″E
- Country: France
- Region: Hauts-de-France
- Department: Somme
- Arrondissement: Amiens
- Canton: Doullens
- Intercommunality: CC Territoire Nord Picardie

Government
  - Mayor (2020–2026): Vincent Marquant
- Area^{1}: 6.46 km^{2} (2.49 sq mi)
- Elevation: 132 m (433 ft)
- Highest elevation: 136 m (446 ft)
- Lowest elevation: 80 m (260 ft)
- Population (2023): 210
  - Density: 33/km^{2} (84/sq mi)
- Time zone: UTC+01:00 (CET)
  - Summer (DST): UTC+02:00 (CEST)
- INSEE/Postal code: 80208 /80370
- ^{1} French Land Register data, which excludes lakes, ponds, glaciers > 1 km^{2} (0.386 sq mi or 247 acres) and river estuaries.

Conteville (French pronunciation: [kɔ̃tvil]) is a commune in the Somme department in Hauts-de-France in northern France.

== Geography ==
Conteville is situated on the D156 and D66 crossroads, some 19 kilometres (12 mi) northeast of Abbeville. It is surrounded by the communes Hiermont, Domléger-Longvillers and Cramont.

== Population ==
Historical population
Year	Pop.	±% p.a.
1968	212	—
1975	160	−3.94%
1982	154	−0.54%
1990	158	+0.32%
1999	172	+0.95%
2007	193	+1.45%
2012	198	+0.51%
2017	211	+1.28%
2023	210	−0.08%
Source: INSEE

== See also ==
- Communes of the Somme department
