= Cramont =

- Commune
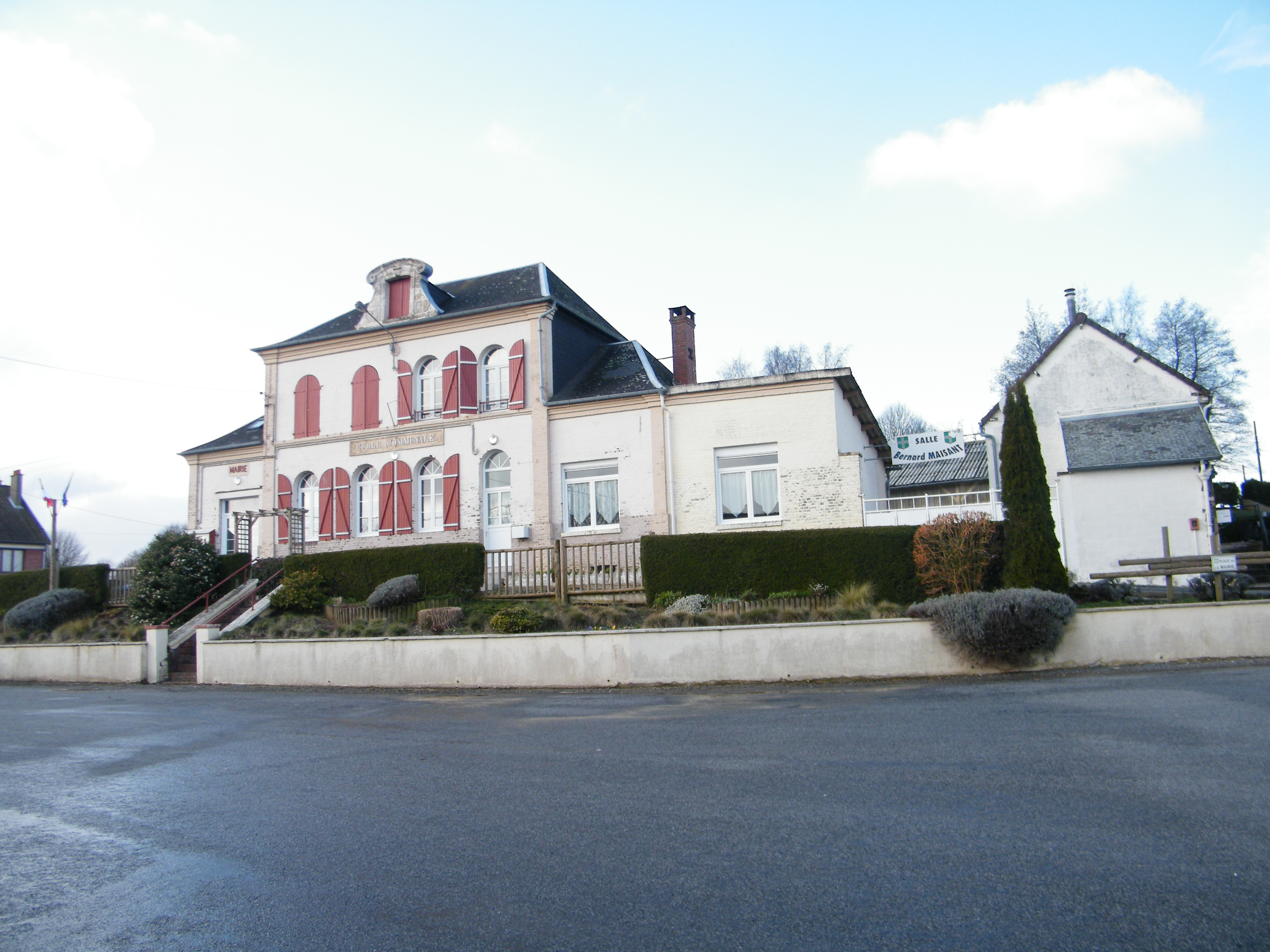
- The town hall and school in Cramont
- Location of Cramont
- Location within France Location within Hauts-de-France
- Coordinates: 50°08′55″N 2°03′22″E
- Country: France
- Region: Hauts-de-France
- Department: Somme
- Arrondissement: Abbeville
- Canton: Rue
- Intercommunality: CC Ponthieu-Marquenterre

Government
  - Mayor (2020–2026): Hervé Level
- Area^{1}: 9.56 km^{2} (3.69 sq mi)
- Elevation: 88 m (289 ft)
- Highest elevation: 136 m (446 ft)
- Lowest elevation: 70 m (230 ft)
- Population (2023): 304
  - Density: 31.8/km^{2} (82.4/sq mi)
- Time zone: UTC+01:00 (CET)
  - Summer (DST): UTC+02:00 (CEST)
- INSEE/Postal code: 80221 /80370
- ^{1} French Land Register data, which excludes lakes, ponds, glaciers > 1 km^{2} (0.386 sq mi or 247 acres) and river estuaries.

Cramont (French pronunciation: [kʁamɔ̃]) is a commune in the Somme department in Hauts-de-France in northern France.

== Geography ==
Cramont is situated on the D166 road, some 12 miles (19 km) northeast of Abbeville.

== History ==
In 1524, the troops of Charles Quint, Holy Roman Emperor and king of Spain reduced the town and much of the surrounding area to ashes.

In 1867, the population stood at 615, in 162 houses. The chief occupations were centred on the linen industry.

== Places of interest ==
- St. Martin's church built in 1857 by Oswald Macqueron, is built of stone and covered in slates.

== Population ==
The inhabitants of the town of Cramont are referred to as Cramontois, Cramontoises in French.

Historical population
Year	Pop.	±% p.a.
1968	337	—
1975	297	−1.79%
1982	269	−1.40%
1990	262	−0.33%
1999	262	+0.00%
2007	290	+1.28%
2012	305	+1.01%
2017	303	−0.13%
2023	304	+0.05%
Source: INSEE

== See also ==
- Communes of the Somme department
