= Rocquencourt =

Rocquencourt refers to two places in France:

- Rocquencourt, Yvelines
- Rocquencourt, Oise
