= Boves station =

Railway station in Boves, France

Coordinates: 49°50′46″N 2°23′53″E

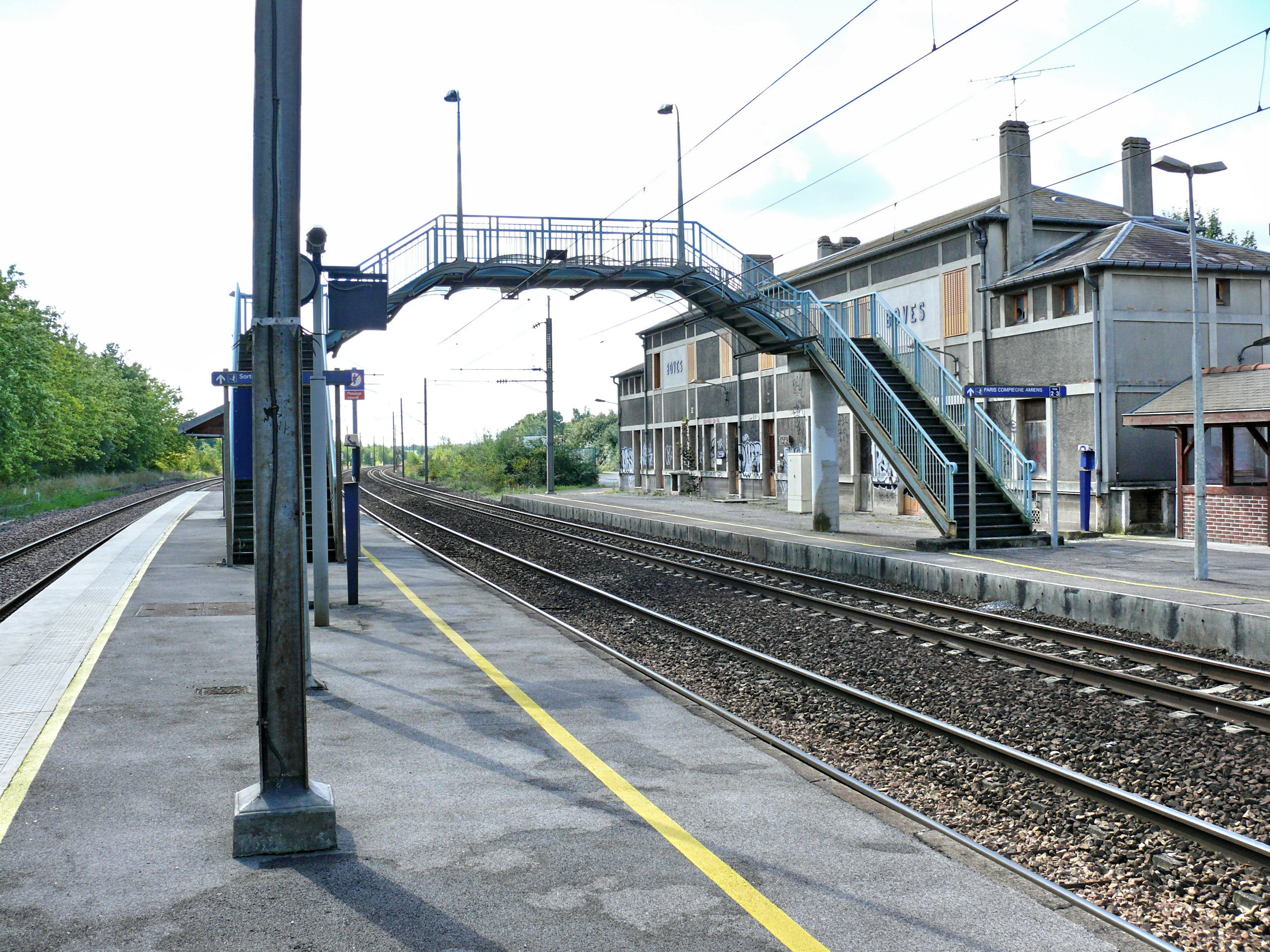
Boves station

Boves is a railway station located in Boves, France. It is situated on the Paris–Lille railway. It is served by regional TER Hauts-de-France trains from Amiens to Creil and Compiègne.

Preceding station	TER Hauts-de-France	Following station
Longueau towards Amiens	Proxi P10	Dommartin-Remiencourt towards Creil
Longueau towards Amiens	Proxi P23	Thézy-Glimont towards Compiègne
