= Dommartin, Somme =

Dommartin
- Commune
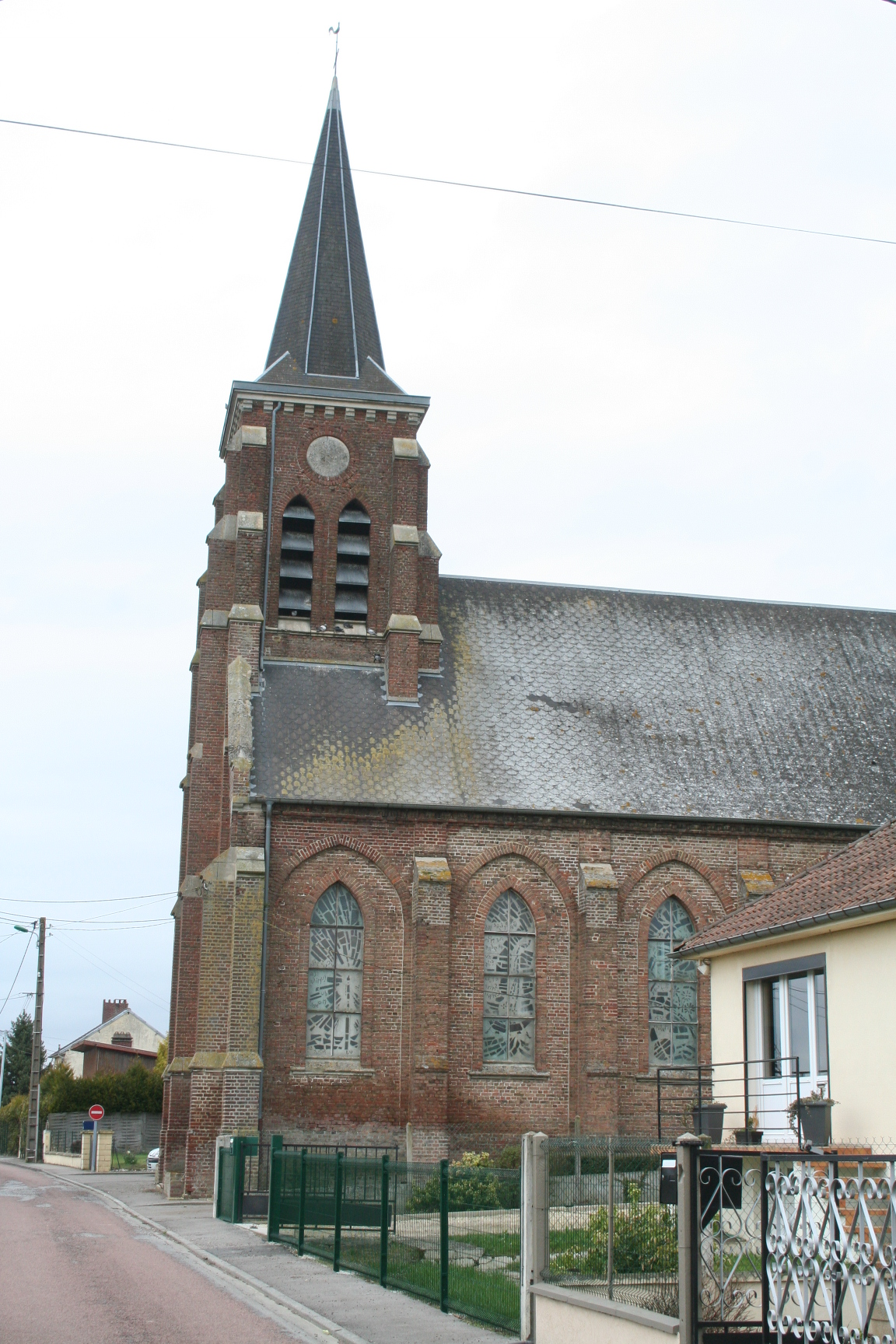
- The church in Dommartin

- Coat of arms
- Location of Dommartin
- Location within France Location within Hauts-de-France
- Coordinates: 49°48′05″N 2°23′31″E
- Country: France
- Region: Hauts-de-France
- Department: Somme
- Arrondissement: Montdidier
- Canton: Ailly-sur-Noye
- Intercommunality: CC Avre Luce Noye

Government
  - Mayor (2020–2026): Fabienne Peronnet
- Area^{1}: 6.55 km^{2} (2.53 sq mi)
- Elevation: 106 m (348 ft)
- Highest elevation: 115 m (377 ft)
- Lowest elevation: 32 m (105 ft)
- Population (2023): 346
  - Density: 52.8/km^{2} (137/sq mi)
- Time zone: UTC+01:00 (CET)
  - Summer (DST): UTC+02:00 (CEST)
- INSEE/Postal code: 80246 /80440
- ^{1} French Land Register data, which excludes lakes, ponds, glaciers > 1 km^{2} (0.386 sq mi or 247 acres) and river estuaries.

Dommartin (French pronunciation: [dɔ̃maʁtɛ̃]; Picard: Domartin) is a commune in the Somme department in Hauts-de-France in northern France.

== Geography ==
Dommartin is situated on the D90 road, on the banks of the river Noye, some 8 miles (13 km) southeast of Amiens. Dommartin-Remiencourt station has rail connections to Amiens and Creil.

== Population ==
Historical population

Year	Pop.	±% p.a.
1793	276	—
1861	383	+0.48%
1911	252	−0.83%
1962	255	+0.02%
1968	281	+1.63%
1975	280	−0.05%
1982	352	+3.32%

Year	Pop.	±% p.a.
1990	380	+0.96%
1999	387	+0.20%
2007	386	−0.03%
2012	341	−2.45%
2017	350	+0.52%
2023	346	−0.19%

Source: EHESS and INSEE

== See also ==
- Communes of the Somme department
