= La Faloise station =

French railway station

La Faloise

General information
- Location: rue de la Gare; La Faloise
- Coordinates: 49°41′47″N 2°20′55″E
- Owner: RFF/SNCF
- Line: Paris–Lille railway
- Platforms: 2
- Tracks: 2

Other information
- Station code: 87313239

History
- Opened: 1846

Services
Preceding station	TER Hauts-de-France	Following station
Ailly-sur-Noye towards Amiens	Proxi P10	Breteuil-Embranchement towards Creil
Location

La Faloise is a railway station located in the commune of La Faloise in the Somme department, France. It is served by TER Hauts-de-France trains from Creil to Amiens. Its elevation is 85 m.

It was first opened on 20 June 1846, when the Paris-Amiens section of the Paris–Lille railway was opened.

== The monument ==
The monument located on the platform facing Paris commemorates the fatal accident that occurred on 20 September 1910. Three employees of the Compagnie du Nord, Jean Hein, Adolphe Cras and Alcide Foy, were killed as they were hit by a fast train.

== Gallery ==
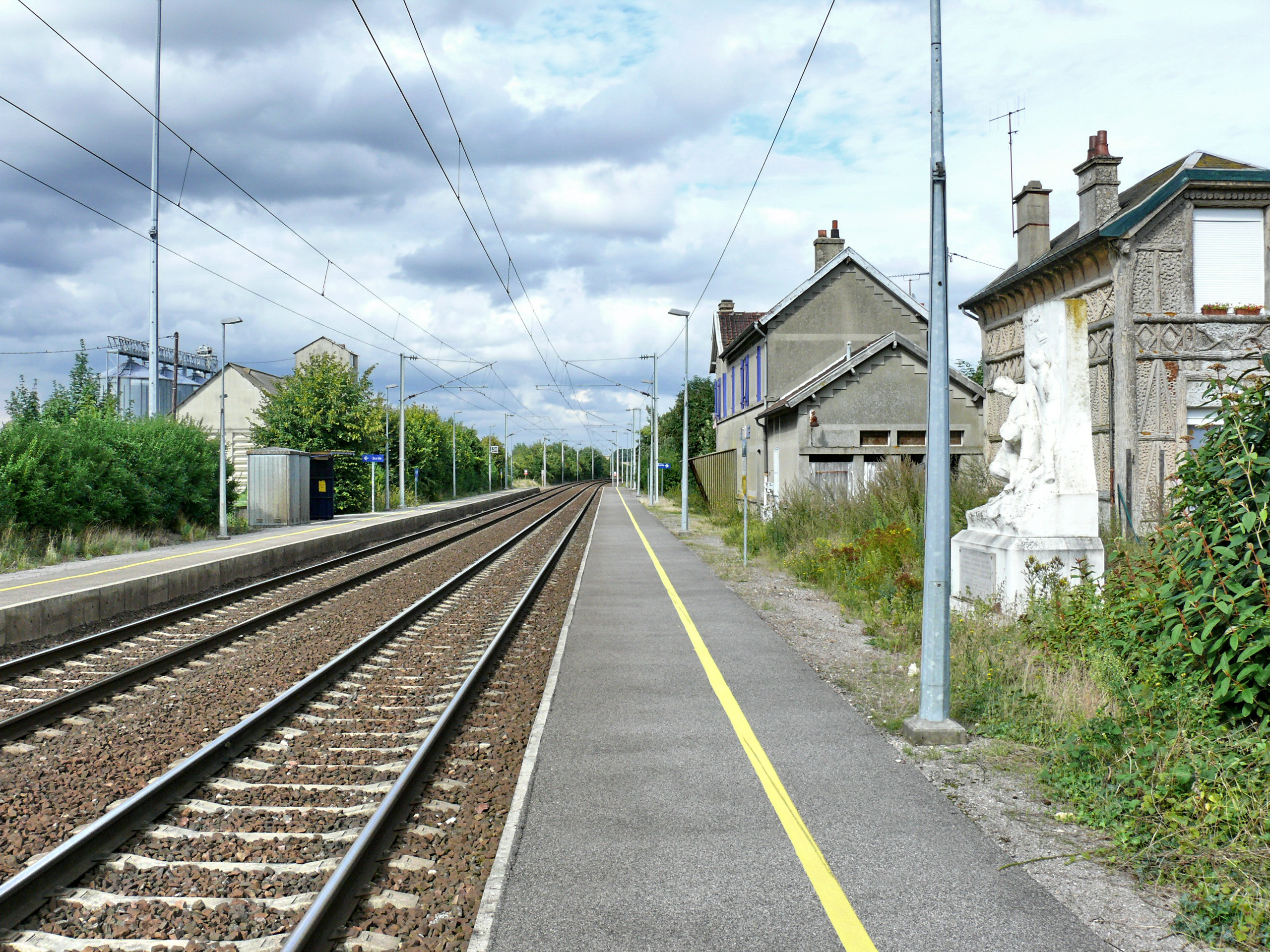
View of the railway station

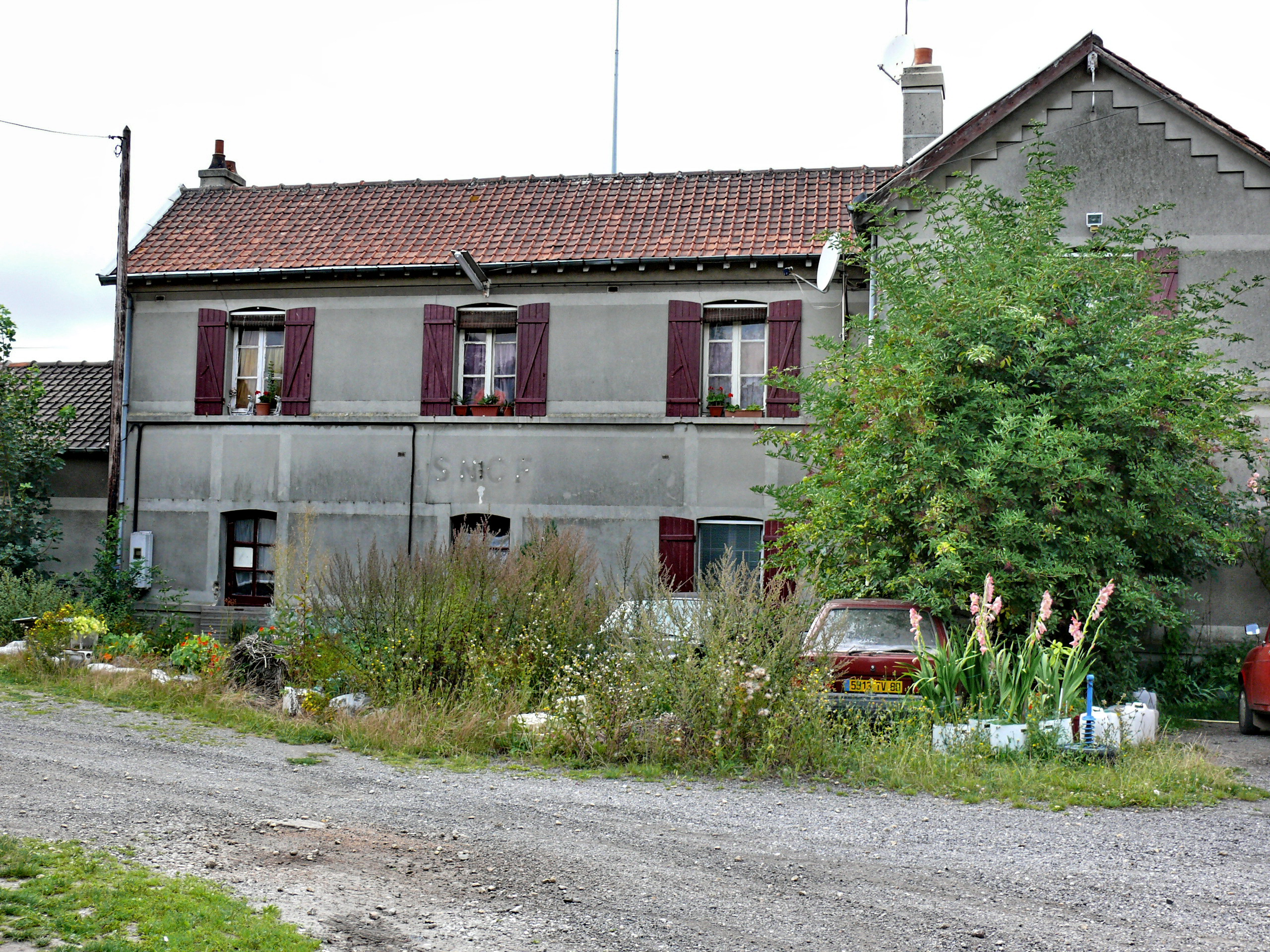
The former station building

== See also ==
- List of SNCF stations in Hauts-de-France
