= Dommartin–Remiencourt station =

French railway station

Dommartin–Remiencourt
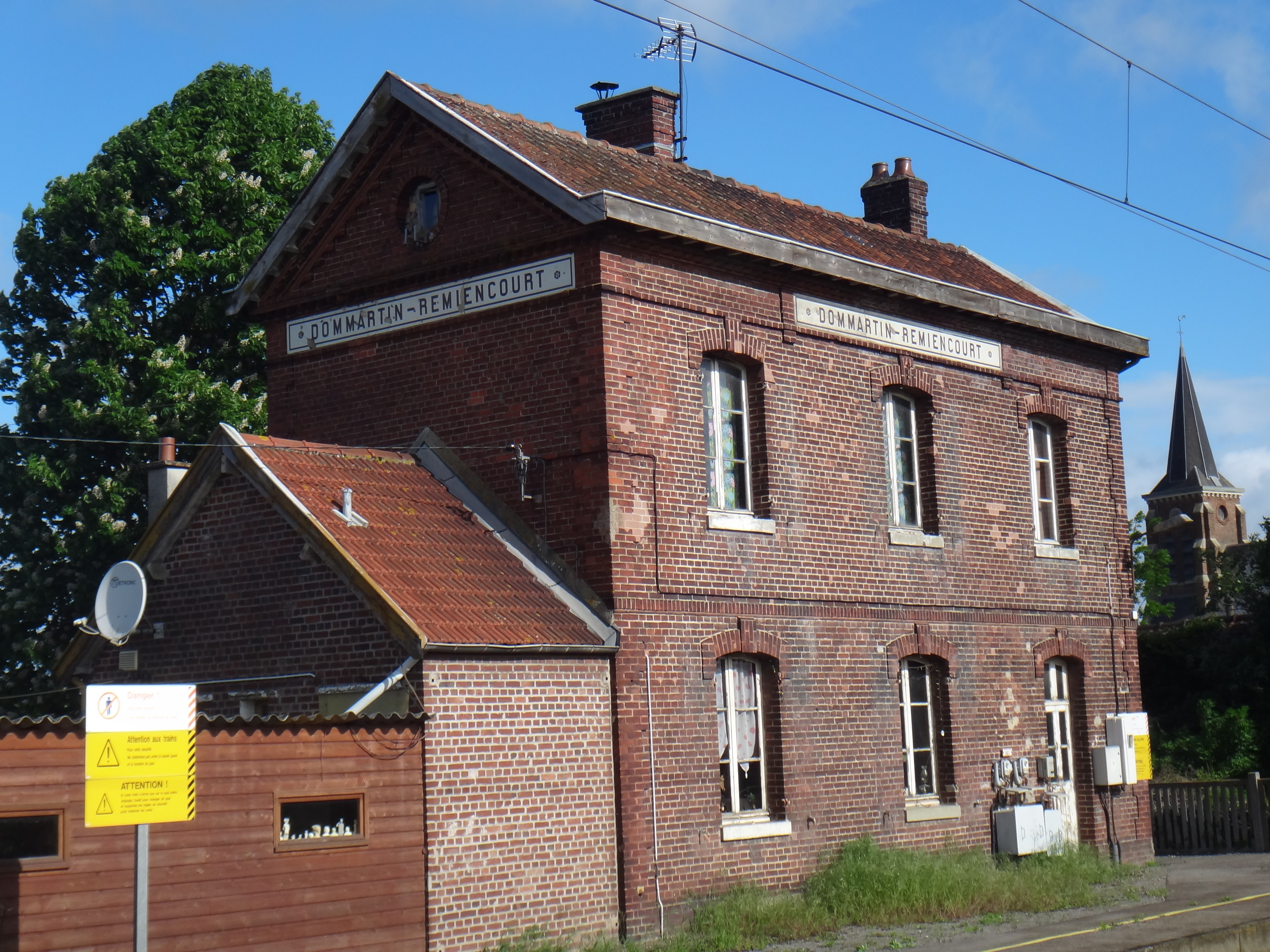
- Station shown in 2014, seen trackside.

General information
- Location: Dommartin
- Coordinates: 49°47′58″N 2°23′33″E
- Owner: RFF/SNCF
- Line: Paris–Lille railway

Other information
- Station code: 87316109

Services
Preceding station	TER Hauts-de-France	Following station
Boves towards Amiens	Proxi P10	Ailly-sur-Noye towards Creil
Location

Dommartin–Remiencourt is a railway station located in the commune of Dommartin near Remiencourt in the Somme department, France. The station is served by TER Hauts-de-France trains from Creil to Amiens. The station is at km 116.573 of the Paris-Lille Line and its elevation is 47 m.

The line was first opened on 20 June 1846 by the Compagnie du chemin de fer du Nord (Nord Railway Company). At the time trains did not stop at Dommartin-Remiencourt.

== See also ==
- List of SNCF stations in Hauts-de-France
