= Ailly-sur-Noye station =

French railway station

Ailly-sur-Noye
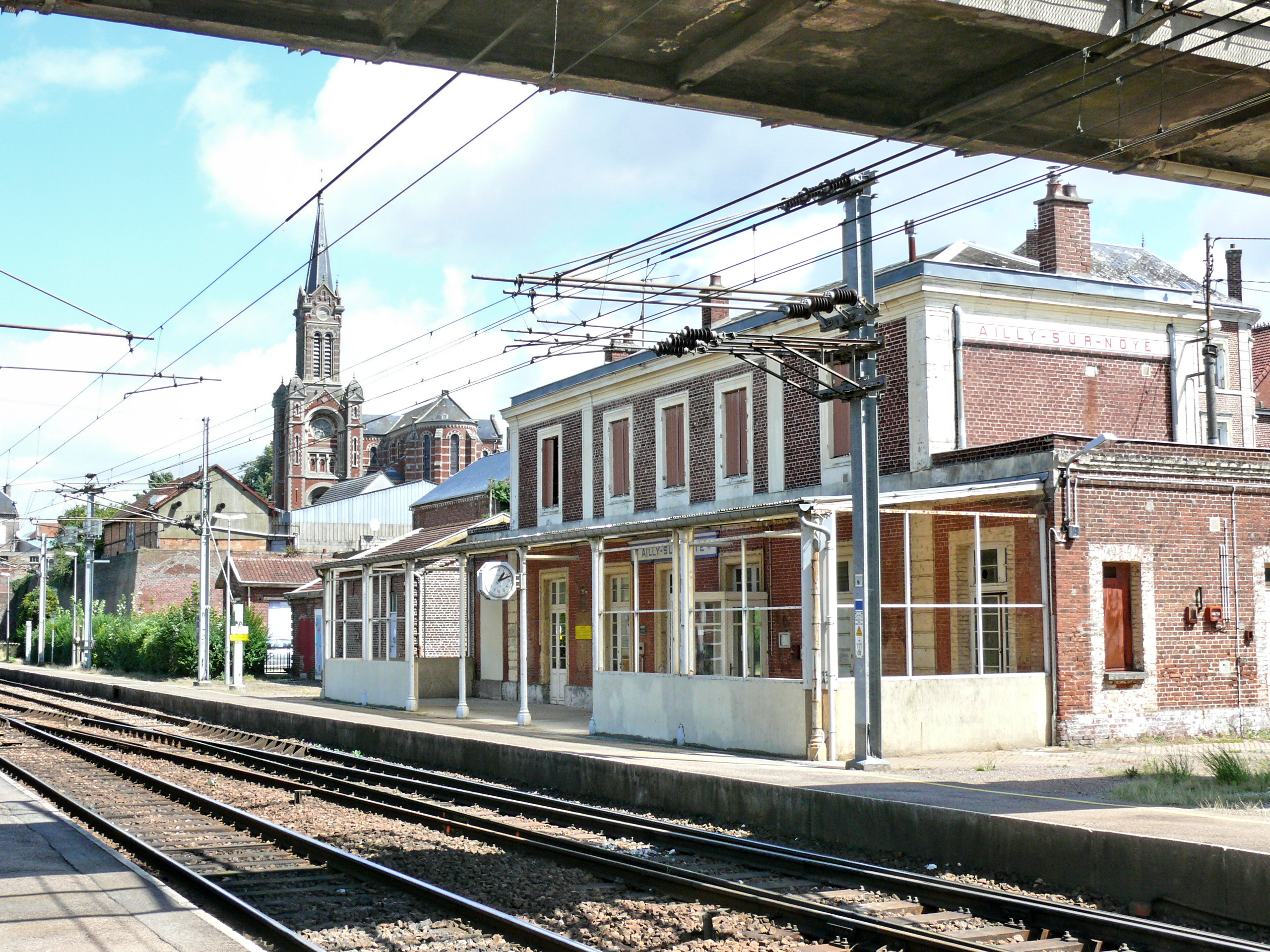

General information
- Location: rue de la Gare; Ailly-sur-Noye
- Coordinates: 49°45′16″N 2°21′50″E
- Owner: RFF/SNCF
- Line: Paris–Lille railway
- Platforms: 2
- Tracks: 2

Other information
- Station code: 87313221

History
- Opened: 1846

Services
Preceding station	TER Hauts-de-France	Following station
Longueau towards Amiens	Citi C10	Breteuil-Embranchement towards Paris-Nord
Dommartin–Remiencourt towards Amiens	Proxi P10	La Faloise towards Creil
Location

Ailly-sur-Noye is a railway station located in the course of Ailly-sur-Noye in the Somme department, France. The station is served by TER Hauts-de-France trains from Paris-Nord to Amiens.

The station dates from 1846 when the Paris-Amiens section of the Paris–Lille railway was opened.

== Gallery ==
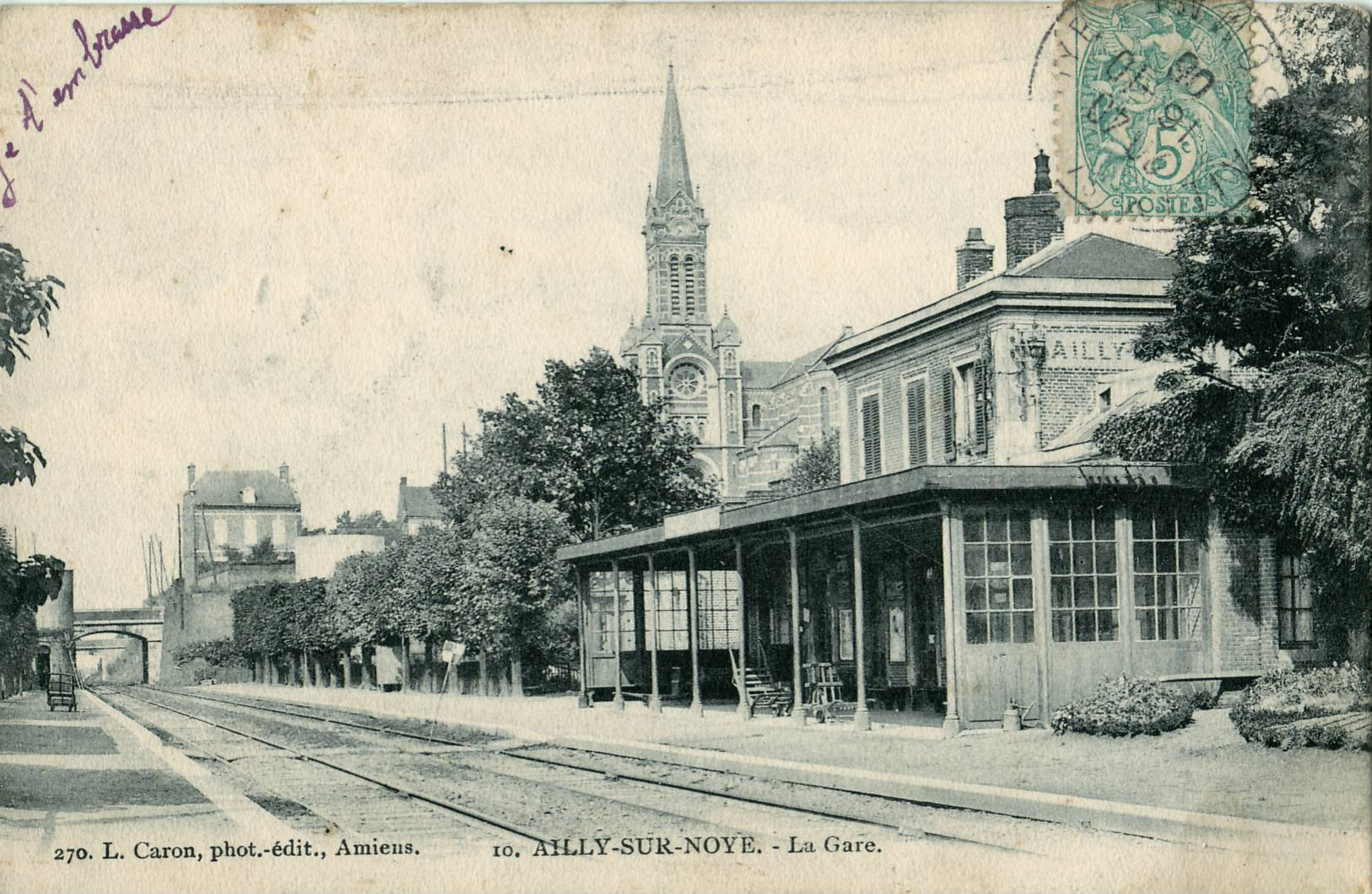
The station in the early 20th century. The line was not electrified then.

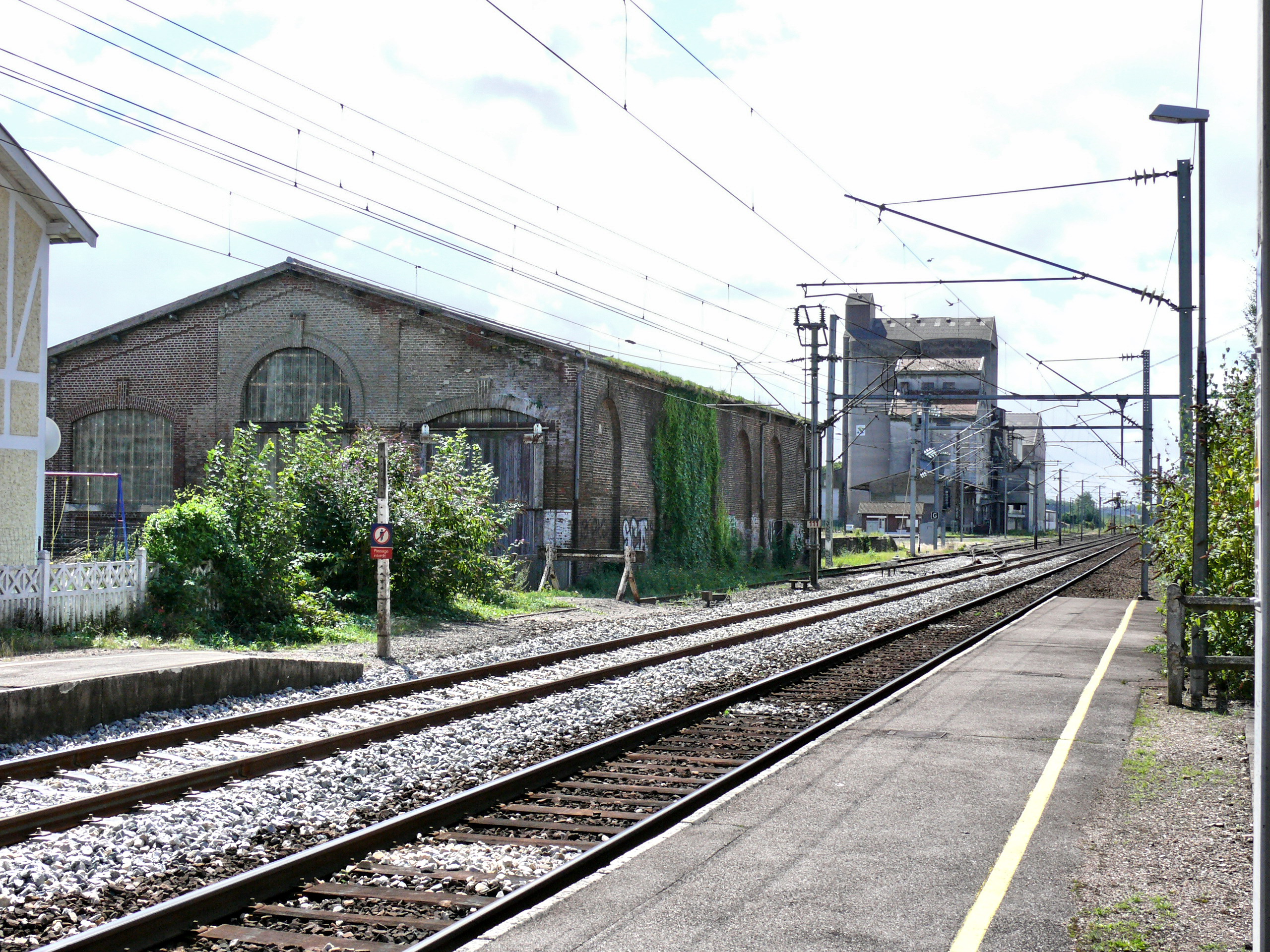
The freight station.

== See also ==
- List of SNCF stations in Hauts-de-France
