= La Faloise =

- Commune
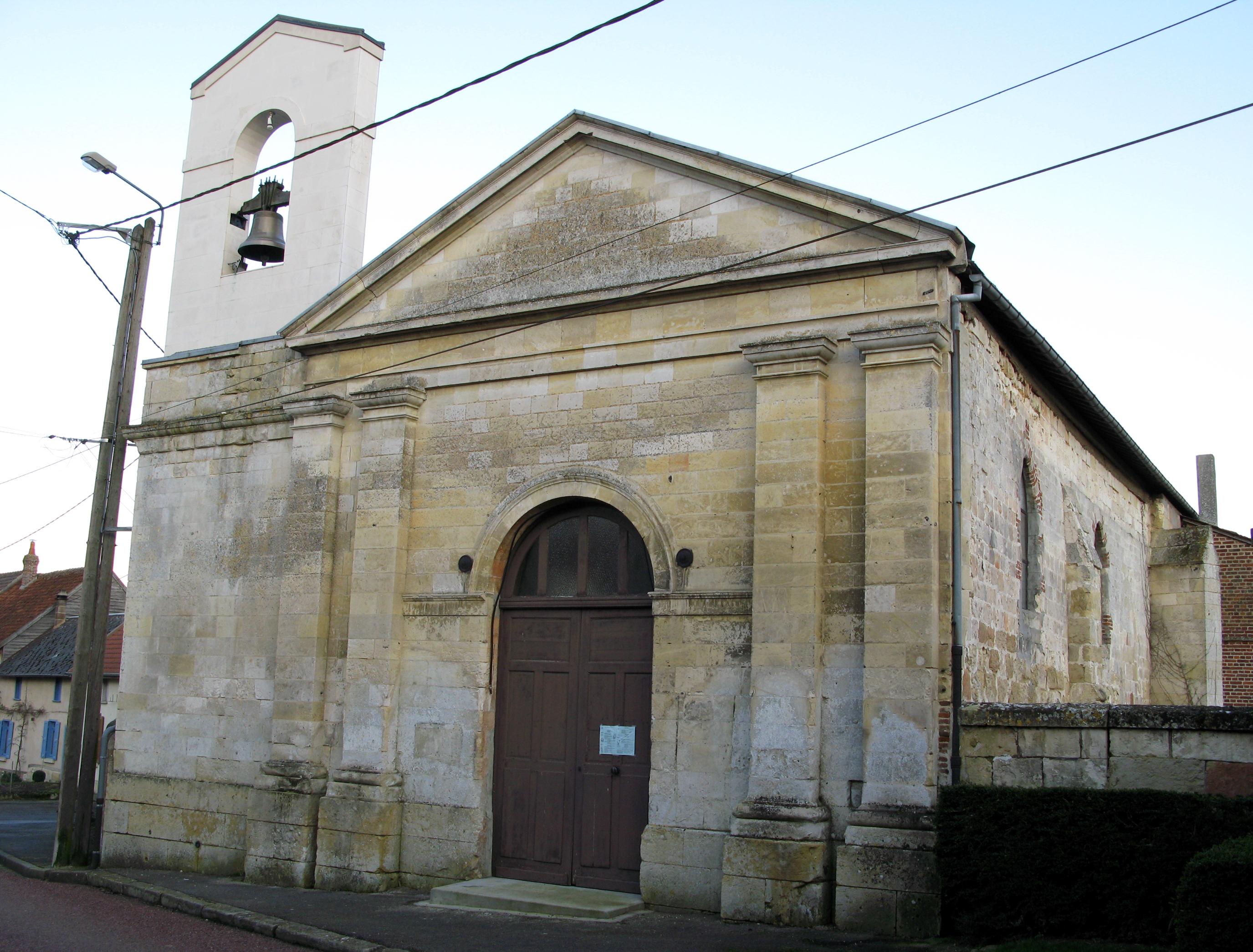
- The church in La Faloise
- Location of La Faloise
- Location within France Location within Hauts-de-France
- Coordinates: 49°42′00″N 2°20′30″E
- Country: France
- Region: Hauts-de-France
- Department: Somme
- Arrondissement: Montdidier
- Canton: Ailly-sur-Noye
- Intercommunality: CC Avre Luce Noye

Government
  - Mayor (2022–2026): Cédric Boquet
- Area^{1}: 9.75 km^{2} (3.76 sq mi)
- Elevation: 84 m (276 ft)
- Highest elevation: 158 m (518 ft)
- Lowest elevation: 57 m (187 ft)
- Population (2023): 204
  - Density: 20.9/km^{2} (54.2/sq mi)
- Time zone: UTC+01:00 (CET)
  - Summer (DST): UTC+02:00 (CEST)
- INSEE/Postal code: 80299 /80250
- ^{1} French Land Register data, which excludes lakes, ponds, glaciers > 1 km^{2} (0.386 sq mi or 247 acres) and river estuaries.

La Faloise (French pronunciation: [la falwaz]; Picard: Faloèse ) is a commune in the Somme department in Hauts-de-France in northern France.

== Geography ==
La Faloise is situated on the D193 road, on the banks of the river Noye, some 15 miles (24 km) south of Amiens. La Faloise station has rail connections to Amiens and Creil.

== History ==
La Faloise grew around a 13th-century château, which was ransacked in 1358, and then rebuilt early in the 15th century by the Burgundians. It was attacked by the English and taken in 1442. The chateau returned to the Burgundians under Charles le Téméraire, on return from his defeat at Beauvais. When he died in 1477, the towns of the Somme reverted to the French crown. La Faloise was then in the hands of the Montmorency family, seigneurs of Breteuil.

In the middle of the 15th century, Louis I de Bourbon married Eléonore of Roye and became seigneur of La Faloise. By the end of the century, the village had experienced much upheaval, being taken by the Ligueurs, Royalist, and then the Spanish. To complete the misfortune, the population was decimated by the plague in 1668.

The French Revolution saw La Faloise rebuilt and industrialised. It became famous for the fabrication of nails. This prosperity lasted until about 1850. The village was occupied by the Germans during the conflicts of the Franco-Prussian War of 1870, the First World War and the Second World War. The church burnt down in 1940; it was rebuilt after the Second World War.

== Population ==
Historical population
Year	Pop.	±% p.a.
1968	248	—
1975	207	−2.55%
1982	184	−1.67%
1990	210	+1.67%
1999	210	+0.00%
2007	239	+1.63%
2012	213	−2.28%
2017	231	+1.64%
2023	204	−2.05%
Source: INSEE

== See also ==
- Communes of the Somme department
