= Fricamps =

- Commune
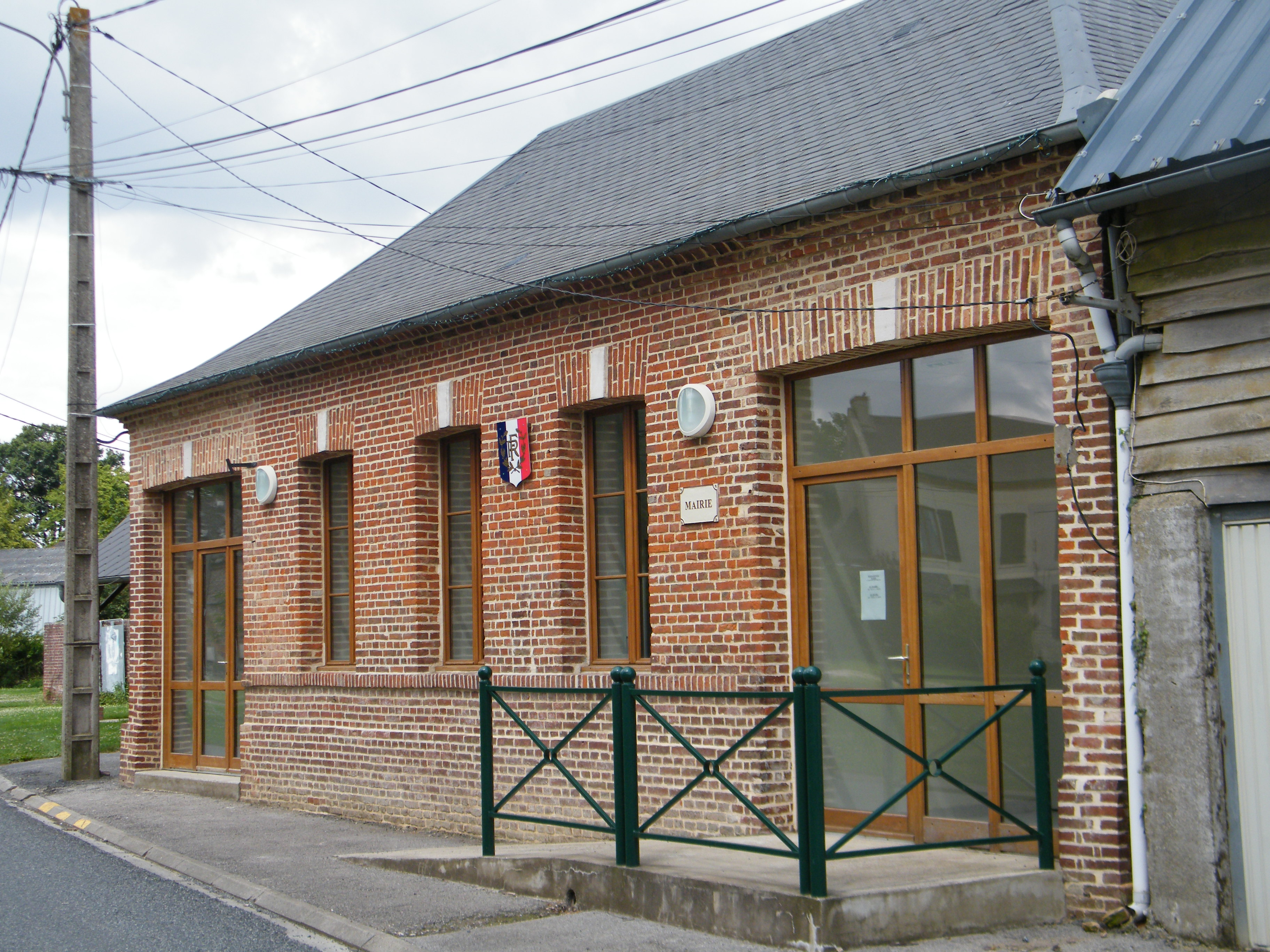
- The town hall in Fricamps

- Coat of arms
- Location of Fricamps
- Location within France Location within Hauts-de-France
- Coordinates: 49°49′14″N 1°59′54″E
- Country: France
- Region: Hauts-de-France
- Department: Somme
- Arrondissement: Amiens
- Canton: Poix-de-Picardie
- Intercommunality: CC Somme Sud-Ouest

Government
  - Mayor (2020–2026): Eddy Goethals
- Area^{1}: 5.55 km^{2} (2.14 sq mi)
- Elevation: 180 m (590 ft)
- Highest elevation: 179 m (587 ft)
- Lowest elevation: 118 m (387 ft)
- Population (2023): 177
  - Density: 31.9/km^{2} (82.6/sq mi)
- Time zone: UTC+01:00 (CET)
  - Summer (DST): UTC+02:00 (CEST)
- INSEE/Postal code: 80365 /80290
- ^{1} French Land Register data, which excludes lakes, ponds, glaciers > 1 km^{2} (0.386 sq mi or 247 acres) and river estuaries.

Fricamps (French pronunciation: [fʁikɑ̃]) is a commune in the Somme department in Hauts-de-France in northern France.

== Geography ==
Fricamps is situated on the D51 road, just a mile from a junction with the A29 autoroute and some 16 miles (26 km) southwest of Amiens.

== Population ==
Historical population
Year	Pop.	±% p.a.
1968	119	—
1975	92	−3.61%
1982	83	−1.46%
1990	77	−0.93%
1999	104	+3.40%
2007	131	+2.93%
2012	151	+2.88%
2017	176	+3.11%
2023	177	+0.09%
Source: INSEE

== See also ==
- Communes of the Somme department
