= Folleville, Somme =

Folleville
- Commune
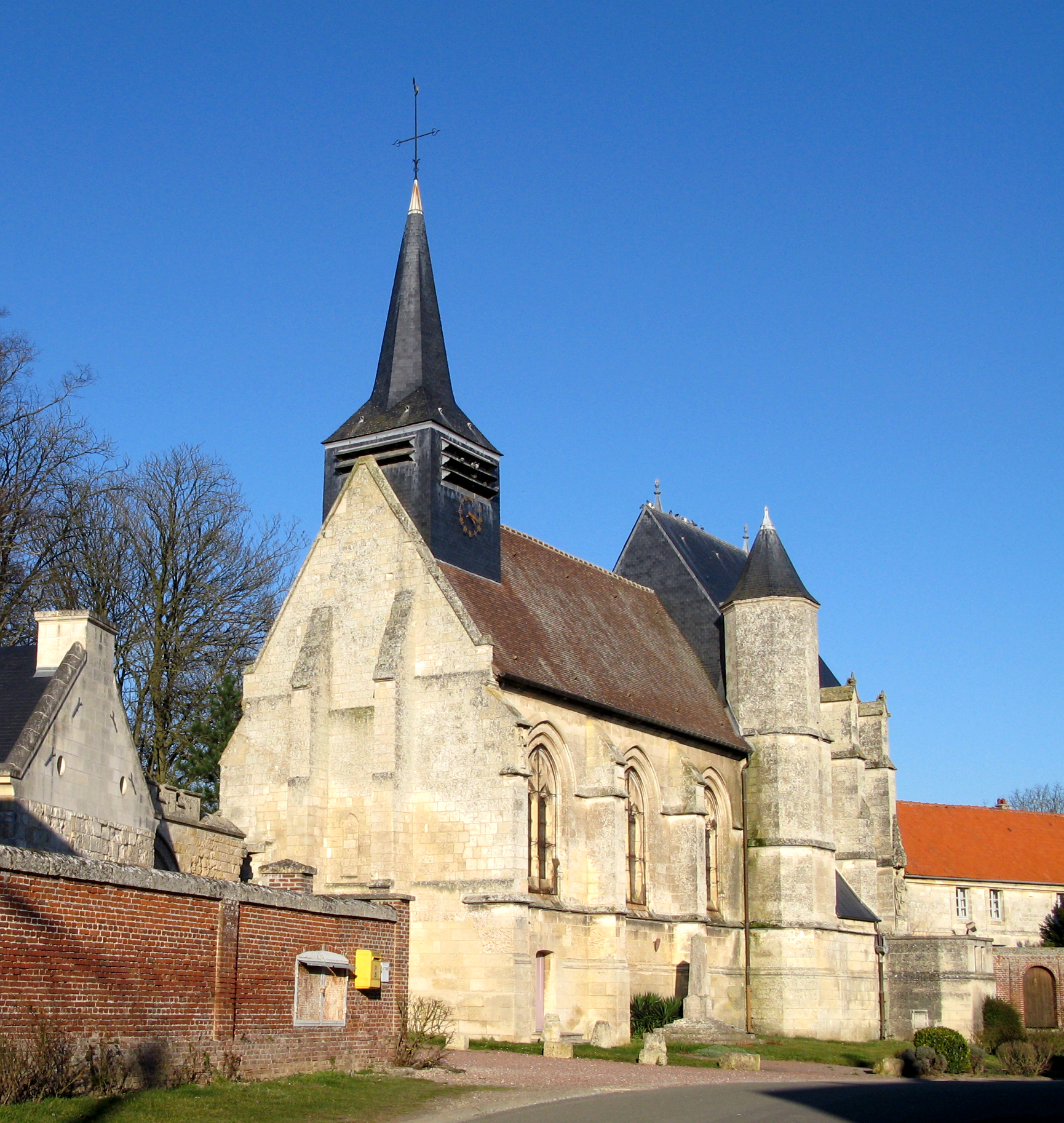
- The church in Folleville

- Coat of arms
- Location of Folleville
- Location within France Location within Hauts-de-France
- Coordinates: 49°40′37″N 2°21′58″E
- Country: France
- Region: Hauts-de-France
- Department: Somme
- Arrondissement: Montdidier
- Canton: Ailly-sur-Noye
- Intercommunality: CC Avre Luce Noye

Government
  - Mayor (2020–2026): Roger Levasseur
- Area^{1}: 6.09 km^{2} (2.35 sq mi)
- Elevation: 146 m (479 ft)
- Highest elevation: 158 m (518 ft)
- Lowest elevation: 62 m (203 ft)
- Population (2023): 154
  - Density: 25.3/km^{2} (65.5/sq mi)
- Time zone: UTC+01:00 (CET)
  - Summer (DST): UTC+02:00 (CEST)
- INSEE/Postal code: 80321 /80250
- ^{1} French Land Register data, which excludes lakes, ponds, glaciers > 1 km^{2} (0.386 sq mi or 247 acres) and river estuaries.

Folleville (French pronunciation: [fɔlvil]; Picard: Forville) is a commune in the Somme department in Hauts-de-France in northern France.

== Geography ==
Folleville is situated on the D109 road, about 15 miles (24 km) south of Amiens.

== Population ==
Historical population
Year	Pop.	±% p.a.
1968	73	—
1975	46	−6.38%
1982	62	+4.36%
1990	63	+0.20%
1999	72	+1.49%
2007	130	+7.67%
2012	148	+2.63%
2017	146	−0.27%
2023	154	+0.89%
Source: INSEE

== Places of interest ==
- Chateau de Folleville (14th century)
- Church of Saint-Jacques-Le-Majeur et Saint-Jean-Baptiste

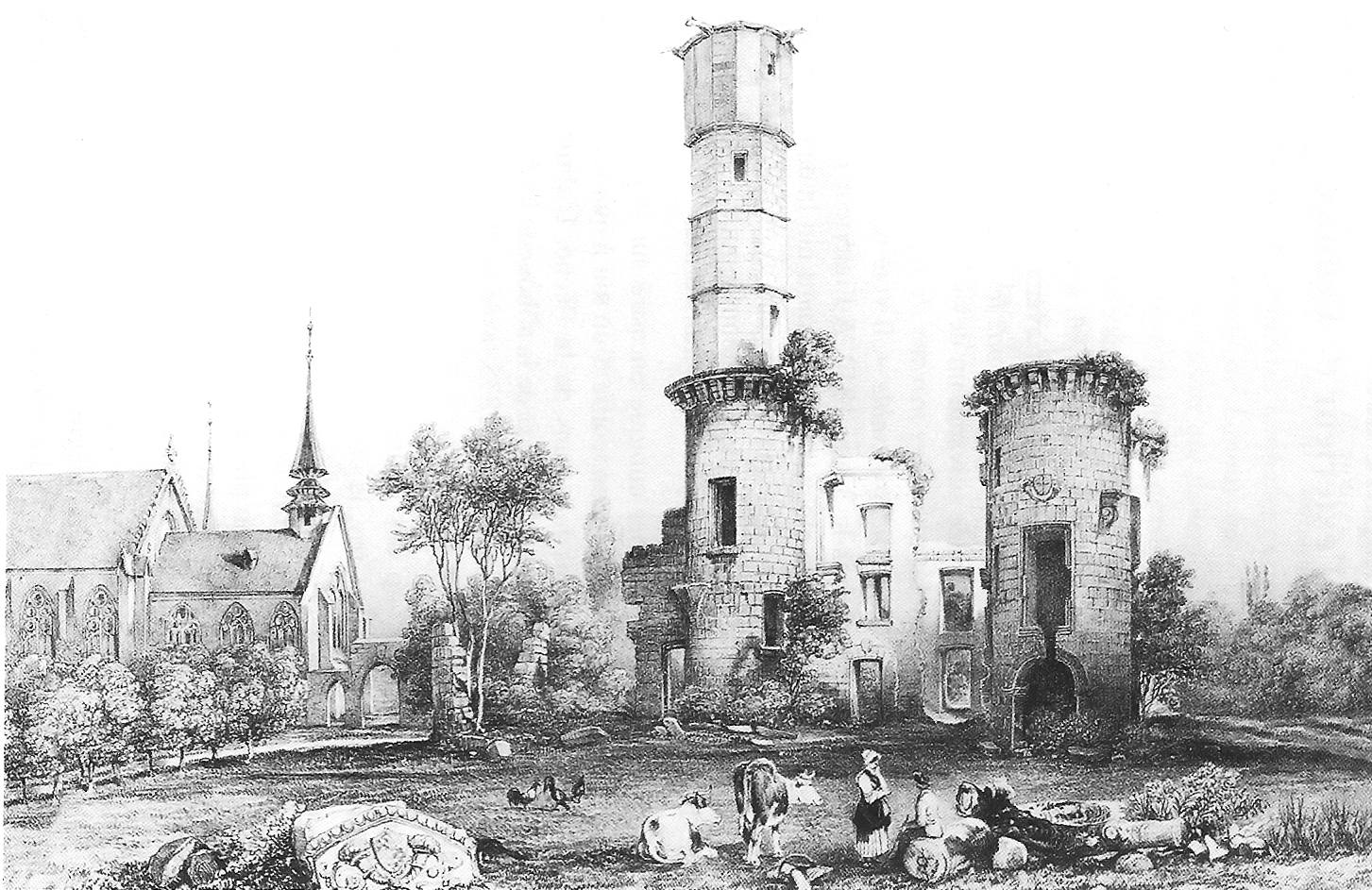
The church and the ruins of the château in 1617

== See also ==
- Communes of the Somme department

== Bibliography ==
- Pierre Michelin, Folleville. La fin du Moyen Âge et les premières formes de la modernité (1519–1617), préface de Jean Estienne, Amiens : Mémoires de la Société des Antiquaires de Picardie - tome 56, 2000, 398 p. ISBN 2-902829-04-3
- Georges Durand, "Les Lannoy, Folleville et l'art italien dans le Nord de la France", in Eugène Lefèbvre-Pontalis (dir.), Le Bulletin Monumental, tome 70, 1906.
