= Fransures =

- Commune
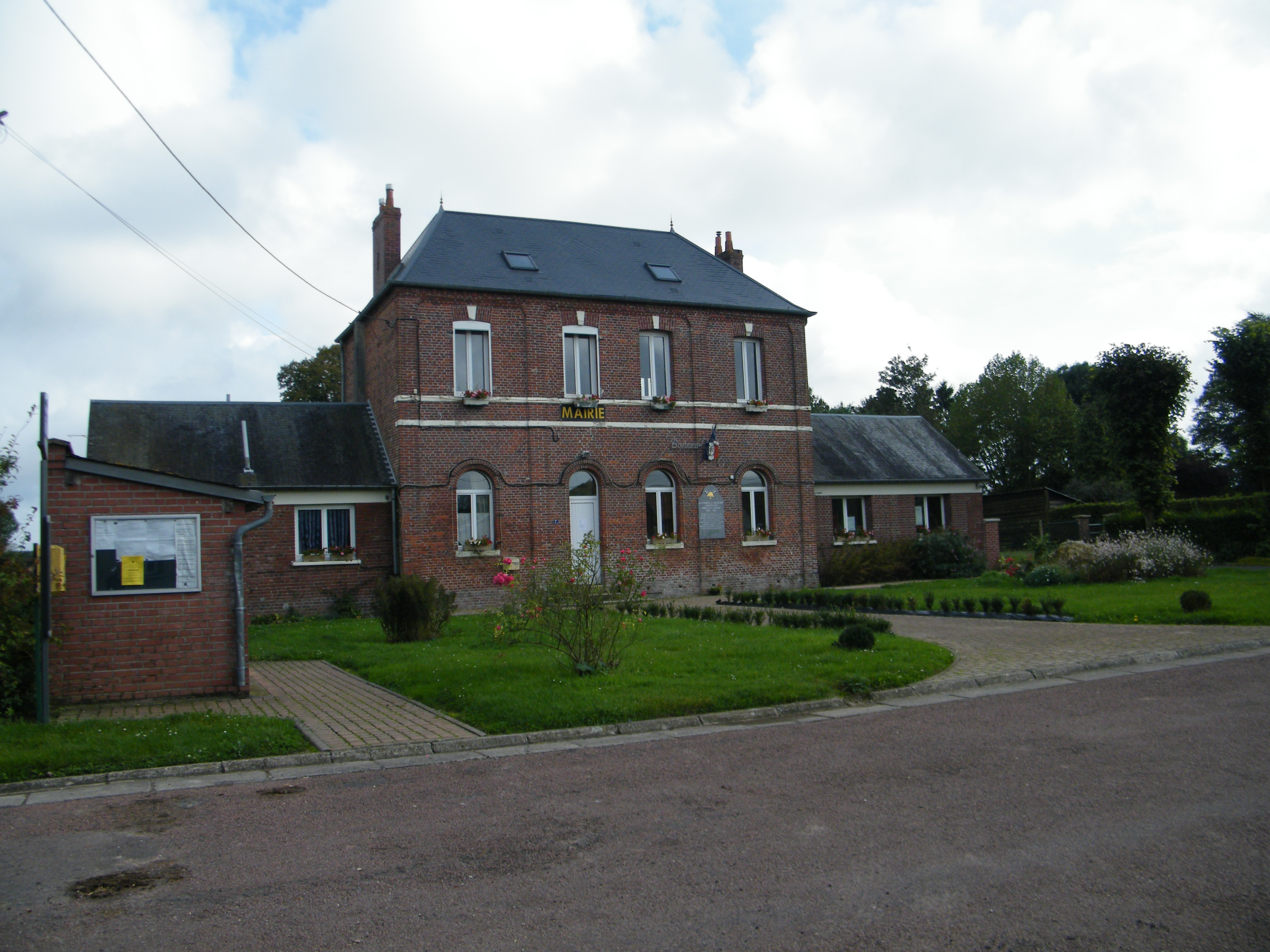
- The town hall in Fransures

- Coat of arms
- Location of Fransures
- Location within France Location within Hauts-de-France
- Coordinates: 49°42′50″N 2°13′59″E
- Country: France
- Region: Hauts-de-France
- Department: Somme
- Arrondissement: Montdidier
- Canton: Ailly-sur-Noye
- Intercommunality: CC Avre Luce Noye

Government
  - Mayor (2020–2026): Hubert Caron
- Area^{1}: 4.26 km^{2} (1.64 sq mi)
- Elevation: 161 m (528 ft)
- Highest elevation: 169 m (554 ft)
- Lowest elevation: 120 m (390 ft)
- Population (2023): 125
  - Density: 29.3/km^{2} (76.0/sq mi)
- Time zone: UTC+01:00 (CET)
  - Summer (DST): UTC+02:00 (CEST)
- INSEE/Postal code: 80349 /80160
- ^{1} French Land Register data, which excludes lakes, ponds, glaciers > 1 km^{2} (0.386 sq mi or 247 acres) and river estuaries.

Fransures (French pronunciation: [fʁɑ̃syʁ]; Picard: Franseu) is a commune in the Somme department in Hauts-de-France in northern France.

== Geography ==
Fransures is situated 15 miles (24 km) south of Amiens by the A16 autoroute and on the D109 road.

== Population ==
Historical population
Year	Pop.	±% p.a.
1968	81	—
1975	72	−1.67%
1982	56	−3.53%
1990	84	+5.20%
1999	107	+2.73%
2007	130	+2.46%
2012	147	+2.49%
2017	133	−1.98%
2023	125	−1.03%
Source: INSEE

== See also ==
- Communes of the Somme department
