= Ailly-sur-Noye =

Commune in Hauts-de-France, France

Ailly-sur-Noye Ailly-dsu-l'Noée (Picard)
- Commune
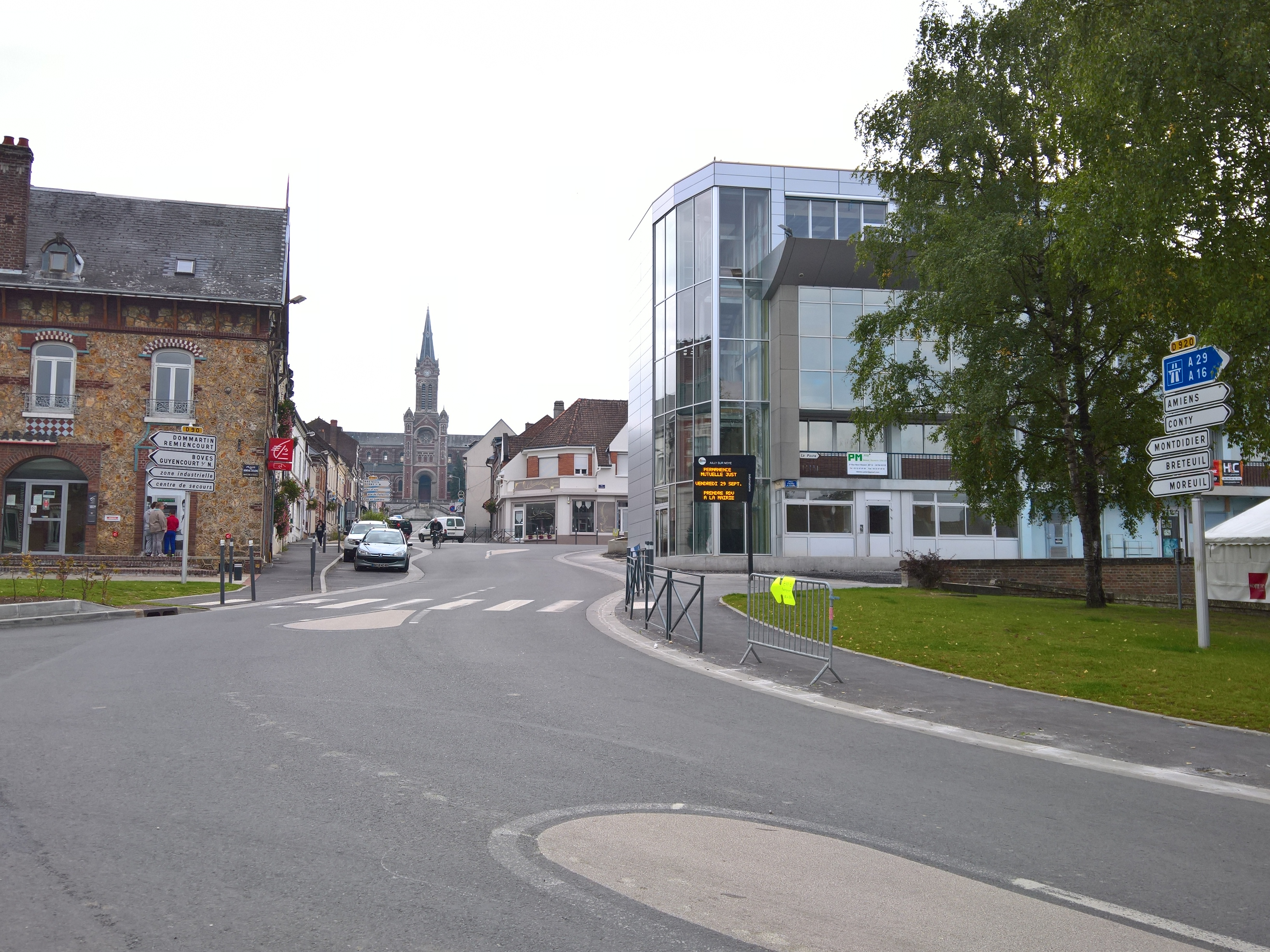
- A general view of Ailly-sur-Noye

- Coat of arms
- Location of Ailly-sur-Noye
- Location within France Location within Hauts-de-France
- Coordinates: 49°45′25″N 2°21′51″E
- Country: France
- Region: Hauts-de-France
- Department: Somme
- Arrondissement: Montdidier
- Canton: Ailly-sur-Noye
- Intercommunality: Avre Luce Noye

Government
  - Mayor (2020–2026): Pierre Durand
- Area^{1}: 25.35 km^{2} (9.79 sq mi)
- Elevation: 57 m (187 ft)
- Highest elevation: 143 m (469 ft)
- Lowest elevation: 43 m (141 ft)
- Population (2023): 2,648
  - Density: 104.5/km^{2} (270.5/sq mi)
- Time zone: UTC+01:00 (CET)
  - Summer (DST): UTC+02:00 (CEST)
- INSEE/Postal code: 80010 /80250
- ^{1} French Land Register data, which excludes lakes, ponds, glaciers > 1 km^{2} (0.386 sq mi or 247 acres) and river estuaries.

Ailly-sur-Noye (French pronunciation: [aji syʁ nwa], literally Ailly on Noye; Picard: Ailly-dsu-l'Noée) is a commune in the Somme department in Hauts-de-France in northern France.

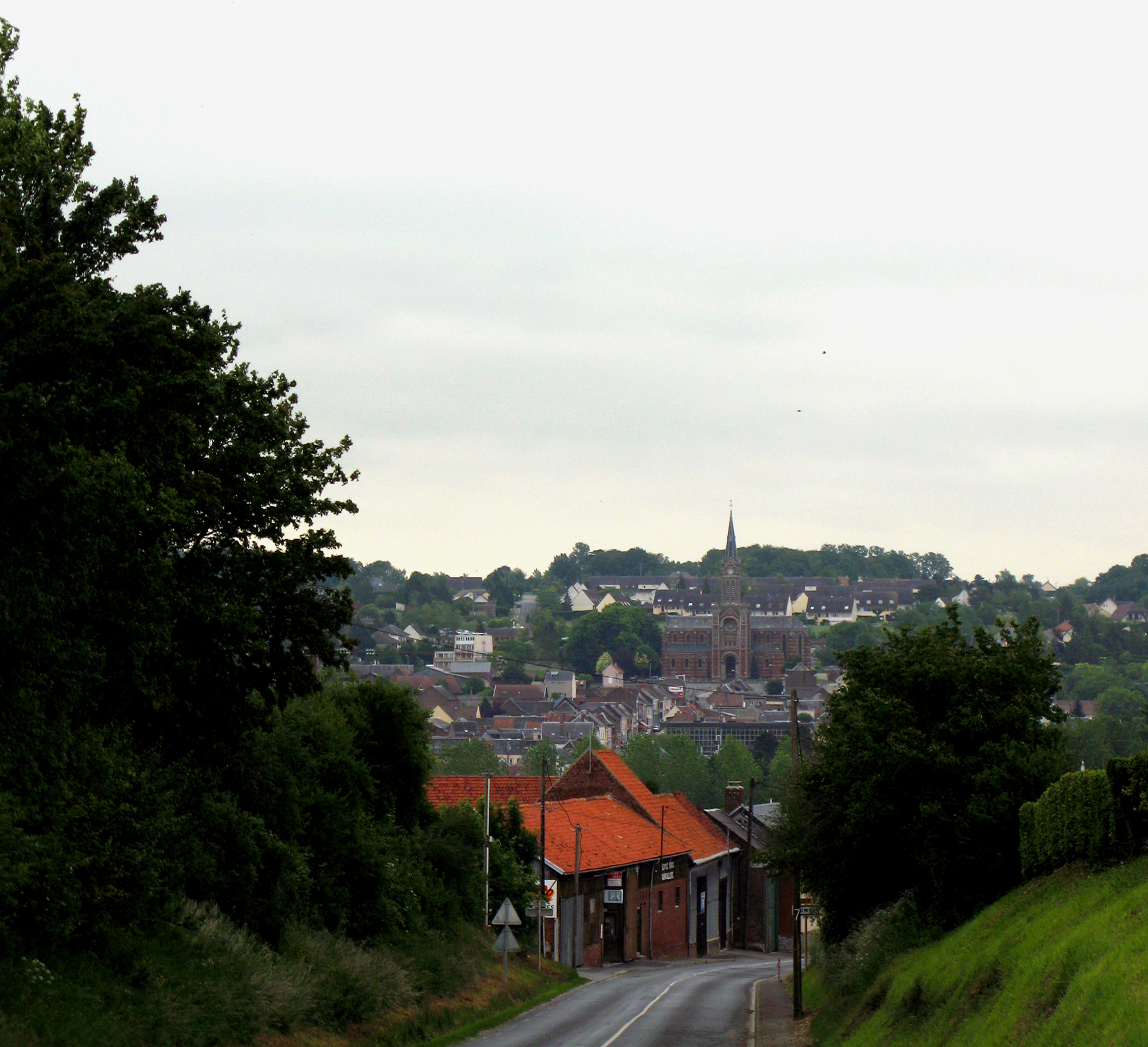
View coming from Amiens

== Geography ==
The commune lies about 20 km (12 mi) south of Amiens and about 13 km (8 mi) from the border with the Oise department, situated at the junction of the departmental roads D7 and the D26, in the valley of the river Noye. Ailly-sur-Noye station has rail connections to Amiens and Creil.

== Population ==
Historical population
Year	Pop.	±% p.a.
1968	2,008	—
1975	2,134	+0.87%
1982	2,596	+2.84%
1990	2,647	+0.24%
1999	2,643	−0.02%
2007	2,699	+0.26%
2012	2,853	+1.12%
2017	2,838	−0.11%
2023	2,648	−1.15%
Source: INSEE

== Places and monuments ==
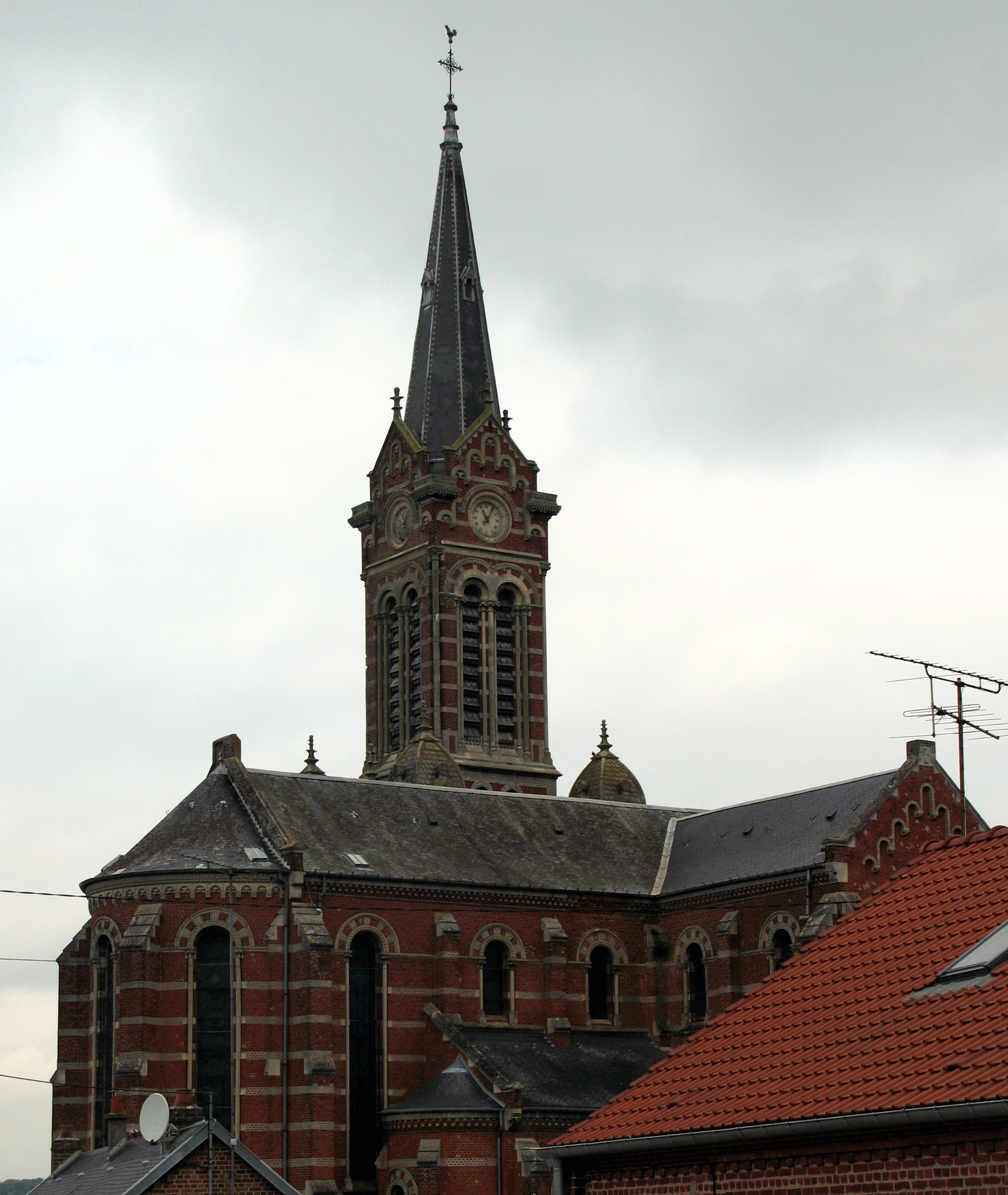
The church, built in 1898

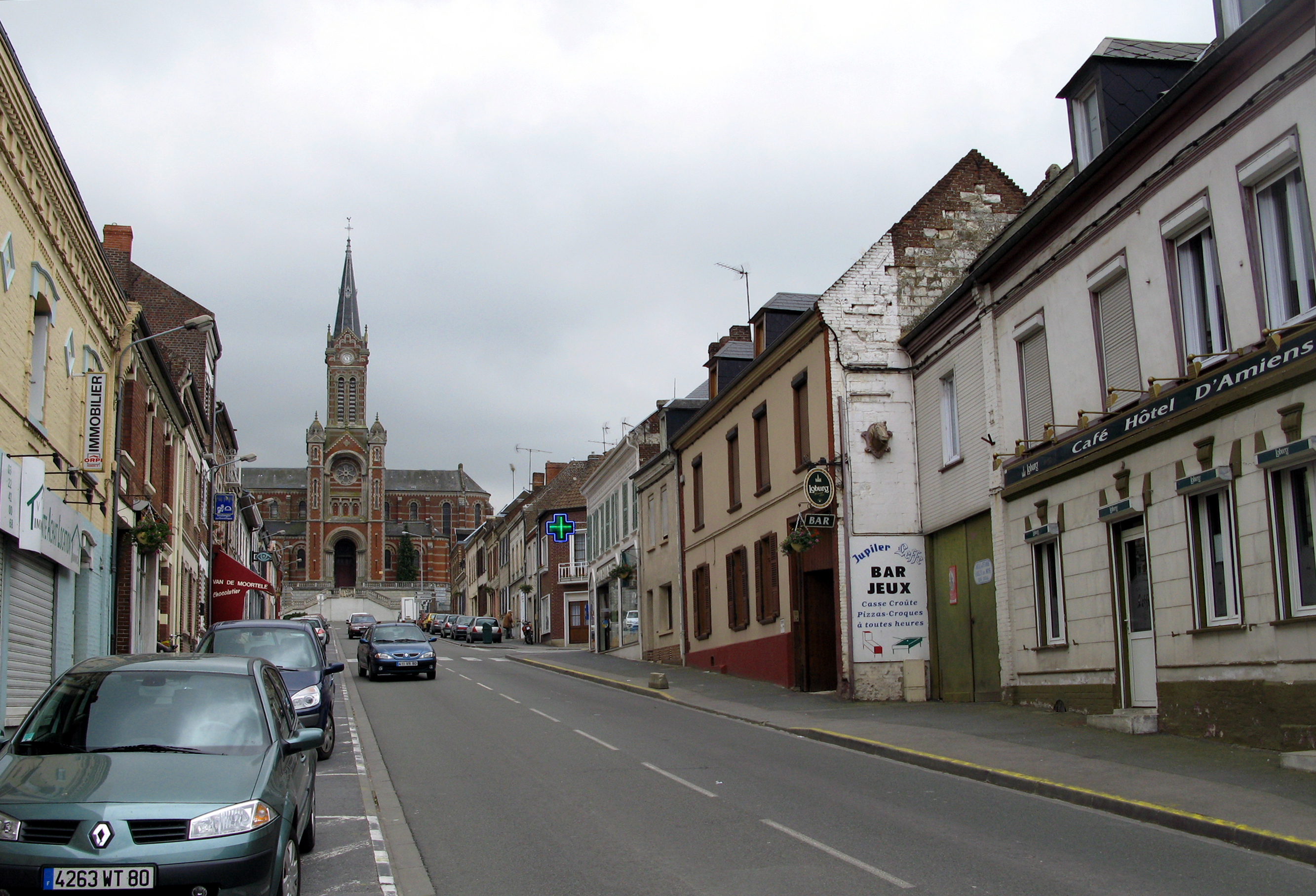
Town centre (rue St-Martin)

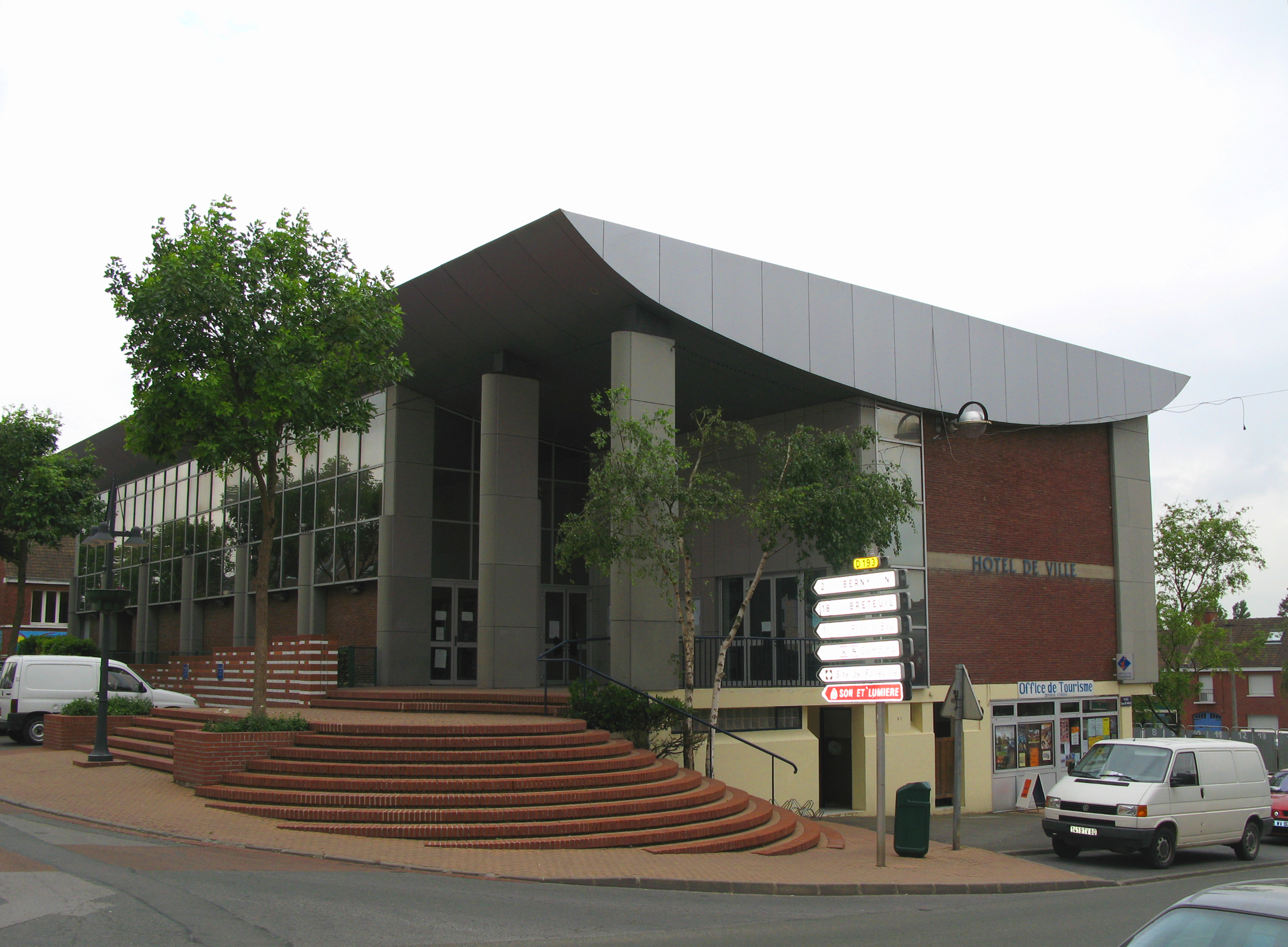
Town hall

== Cultural and sports activities ==
- Annual Son et Lumière Le Souffle de la terre narrates the story of the people of Picardy from Gaulish times up to the Second World War. More than 450,000 have been to see the spectacle.
- Water sports on the lake area.
- Motocross club on two different courses.
- 45 separate clubs and societies participate in the life of the community.

== See also ==
- Communes of the Somme department
