= Grivesnes =

- Commune
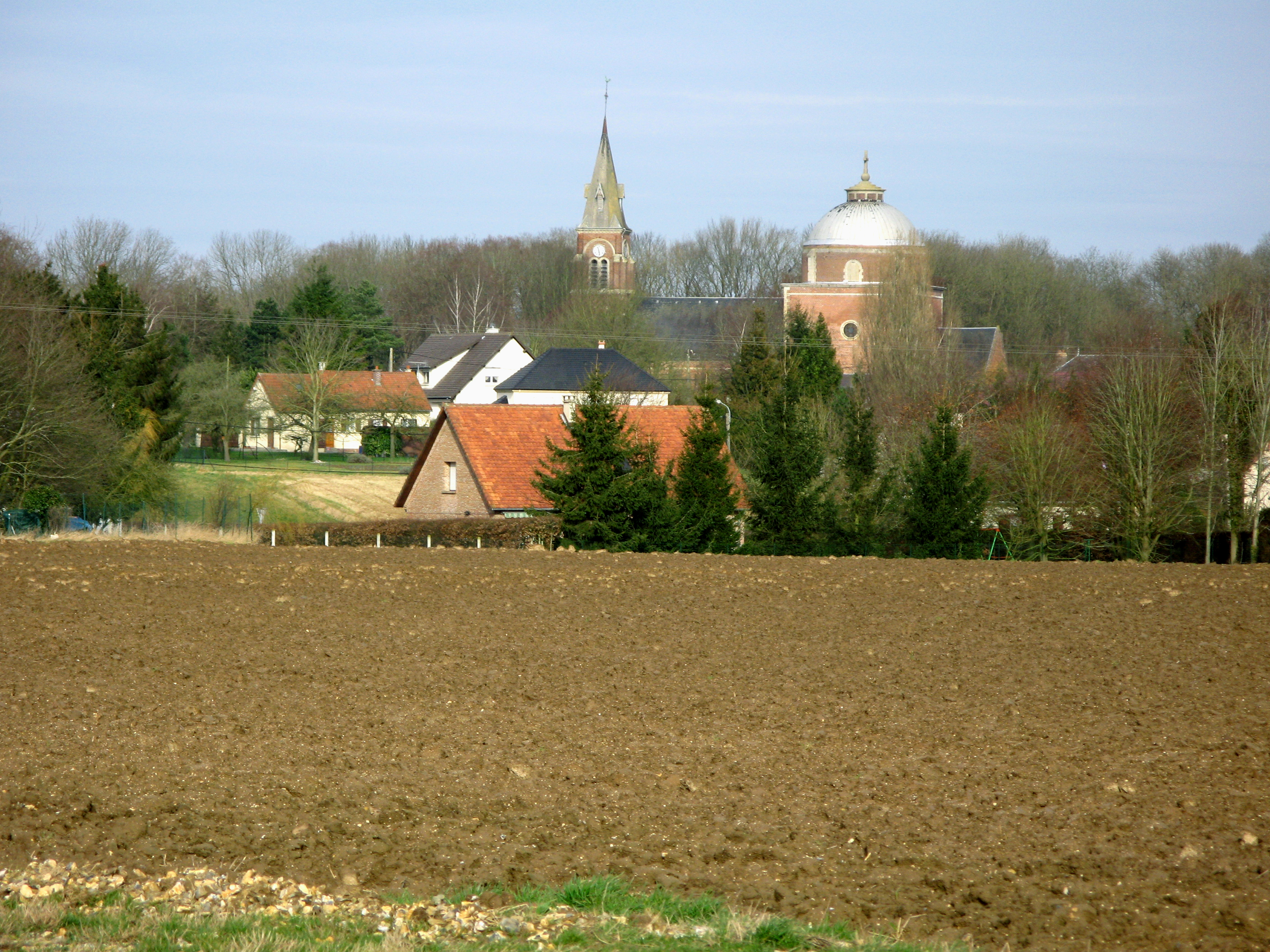
- A general view of Grivesnes

- Coat of arms
- Location of Grivesnes
- Location within France Location within Hauts-de-France
- Coordinates: 49°41′18″N 2°28′18″E
- Country: France
- Region: Hauts-de-France
- Department: Somme
- Arrondissement: Montdidier
- Canton: Ailly-sur-Noye
- Intercommunality: CC Avre Luce Noye

Government
  - Mayor (2020–2026): Anne-Marie Prevost
- Area^{1}: 18.75 km^{2} (7.24 sq mi)
- Elevation: 125 m (410 ft)
- Highest elevation: 131 m (430 ft)
- Lowest elevation: 63 m (207 ft)
- Population (2023): 409
  - Density: 21.8/km^{2} (56.5/sq mi)
- Time zone: UTC+01:00 (CET)
  - Summer (DST): UTC+02:00 (CEST)
- INSEE/Postal code: 80390 /80250
- ^{1} French Land Register data, which excludes lakes, ponds, glaciers > 1 km^{2} (0.386 sq mi or 247 acres) and river estuaries.

Grivesnes (French pronunciation: [ɡʁivɛn]) is a commune in the Somme department in Hauts-de-France in northern France.

== Geography ==
Grivesnes is situated on the D26 road, some 18 miles (29 km) south of Amiens.

== History ==
A castle is reputed to have existed before the Jacquerie uprising of 1358 (which started in this district), but sources lack any substance.
A 15th century manor house was destroyed by Burgundian troops during their retreat from Beauvais after the victory of Jeanne Hachette.
Between 1611, the date of his marriage, and 1640, the date of his death, Louis of Goussencourt erected the principal parts of the château.
Enlarged in the 18th century, the château was very much part of the Ancien Régime and when, during the French Revolution, it was decided to confiscate the property, the Count of Grivesnes didn't oppose it, as his son (Louis-Henri (1766–1849)) had already emigrated to Quebec.
During the auctions of 1793 and 1794, the castle was sold as national property. An inhabitant of Grivesnes, Roch Théry, whose family had lived in the parish for more than two centuries, purchased some of the land as well as the mill, although it was later returned to its owners. The entire site was sold in 1899 to an Amiens notary by the name of Lenain.

During the First World War, the town was ravaged and all the community archives were destroyed. The castle, surrounded by a park of 19 hectares, comprised a distillery and a farm of 132 hectares, underwent shelling that damaged 66% of the property.
From March 29 to April 7, 1918, the town was the centre of a fierce battle. Fighting hand-to-hand, with fixed bayonets, the French and British troops cut off the road to Amiens to the Germans. Many soldiers were buried in unmarked graves, without any ceremony.
In June 1990, a commemorative stele was erected by French and German ex-combatants.

== Population ==
Historical population
Year	Pop.	±% p.a.
1968	325	—
1975	245	−3.96%
1982	266	+1.18%
1990	288	+1.00%
1999	291	+0.12%
2007	356	+2.55%
2012	378	+1.21%
2017	407	+1.49%
2023	409	+0.08%
Source: INSEE

== Places of interest ==
Grivesnes is fortunate to still have two ancient monuments, after the ravages of World War I.

- The château. Around 1845, considerable restoration took place, replacing the original bright red-orange brick and white stone with sombre red bricks and grey stone. Modified again during the 1920s with little respect for its original appearance, with a shortened pavilion and roofed gracelessly.
- The church was built from 1835 to 1842, in the park of the château, in the Restoration style. Recently classified as an important building of some significance. Attached to the church is the vault of the noble family of Beaurepaires de Louvagny.
- The château of Filescamps. (2 miles or so outside the village) After the bombardments of 1918, the building was ruined. All that's left today is a farm and some outbuildings that once formed part of the chateau itself.
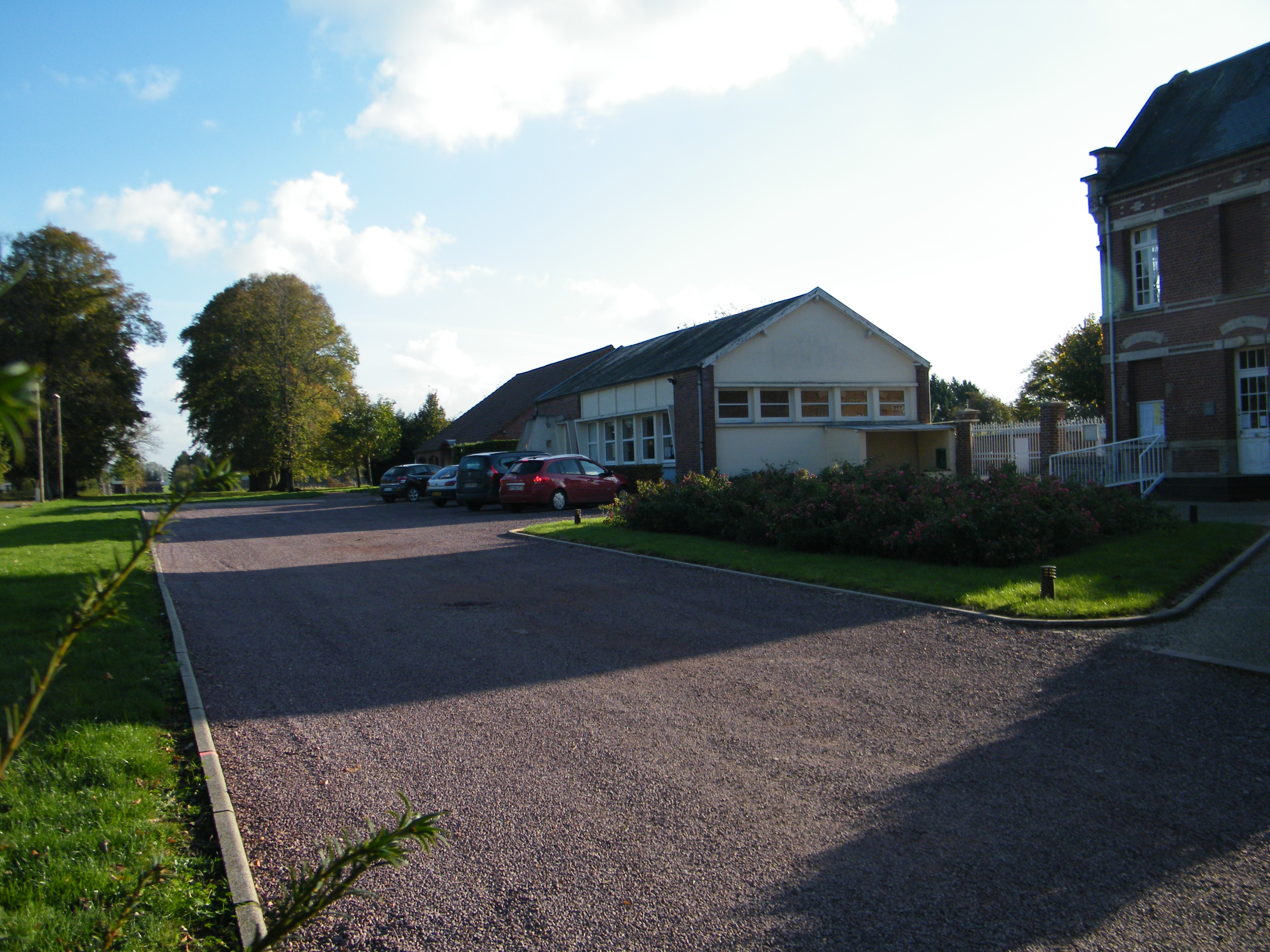
The school of Grivesnes.

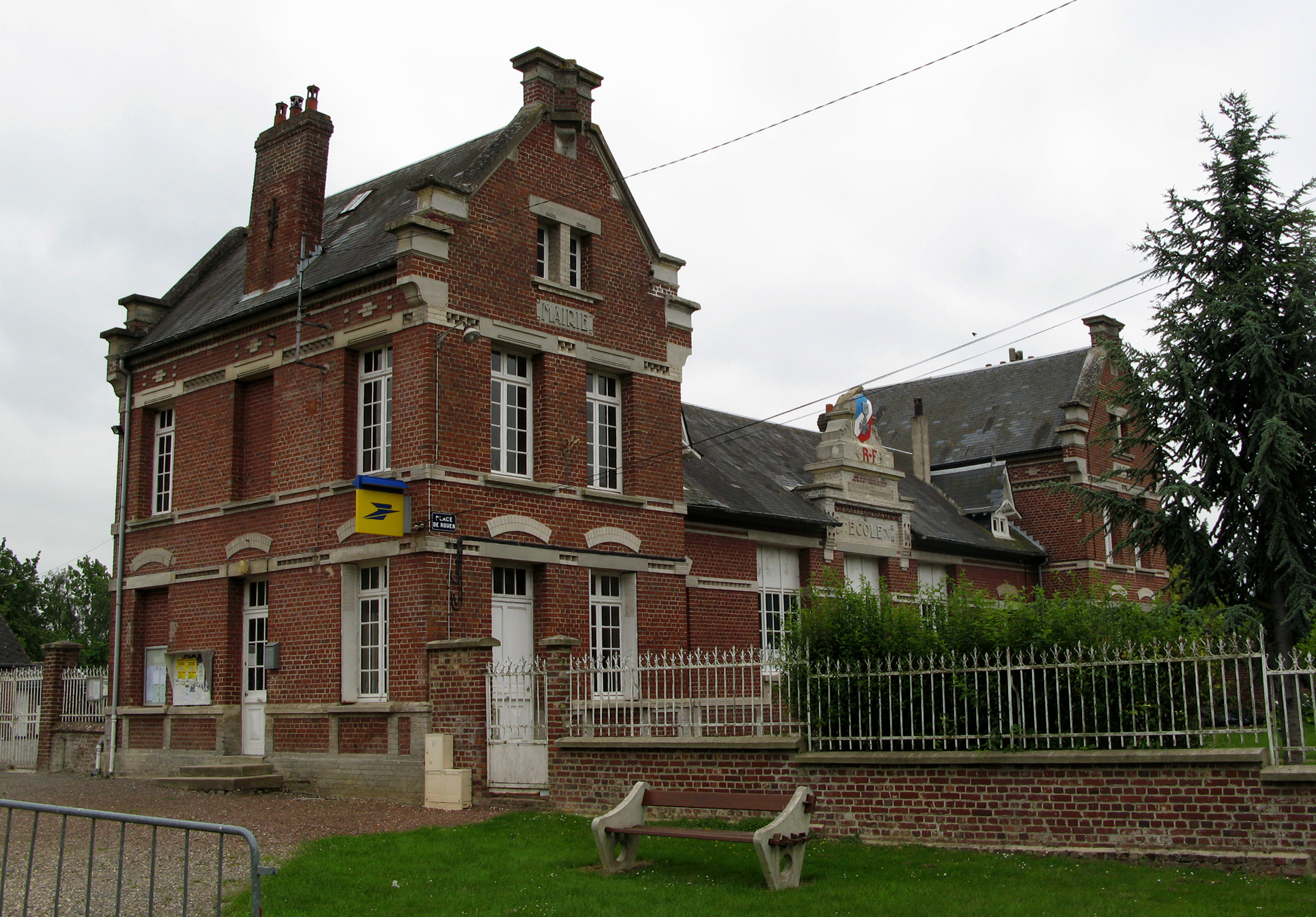
Town hall.

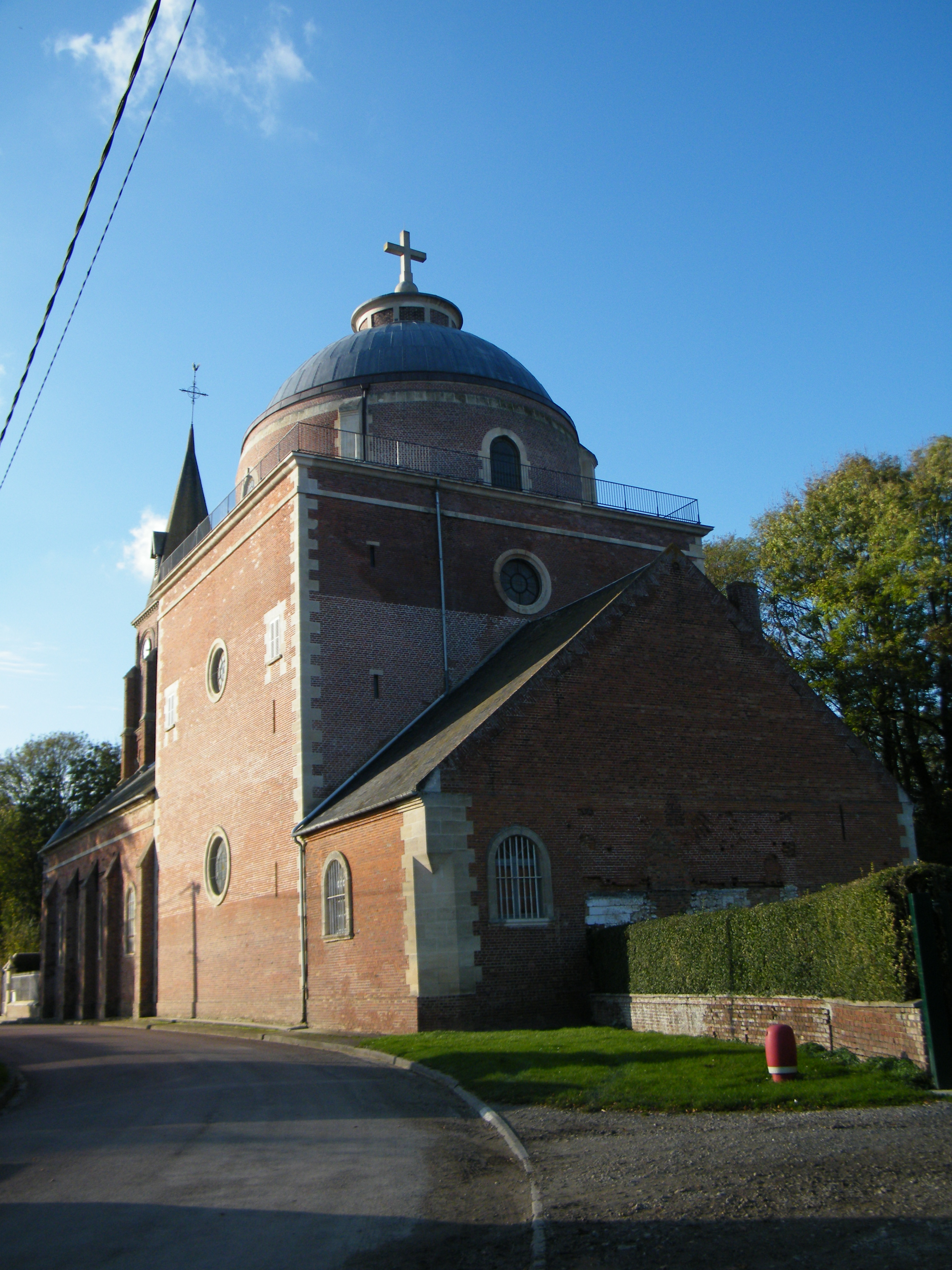
The church Saint Aignan.

== See also ==
- Communes of the Somme department
