= Quiry-le-Sec =

- Commune
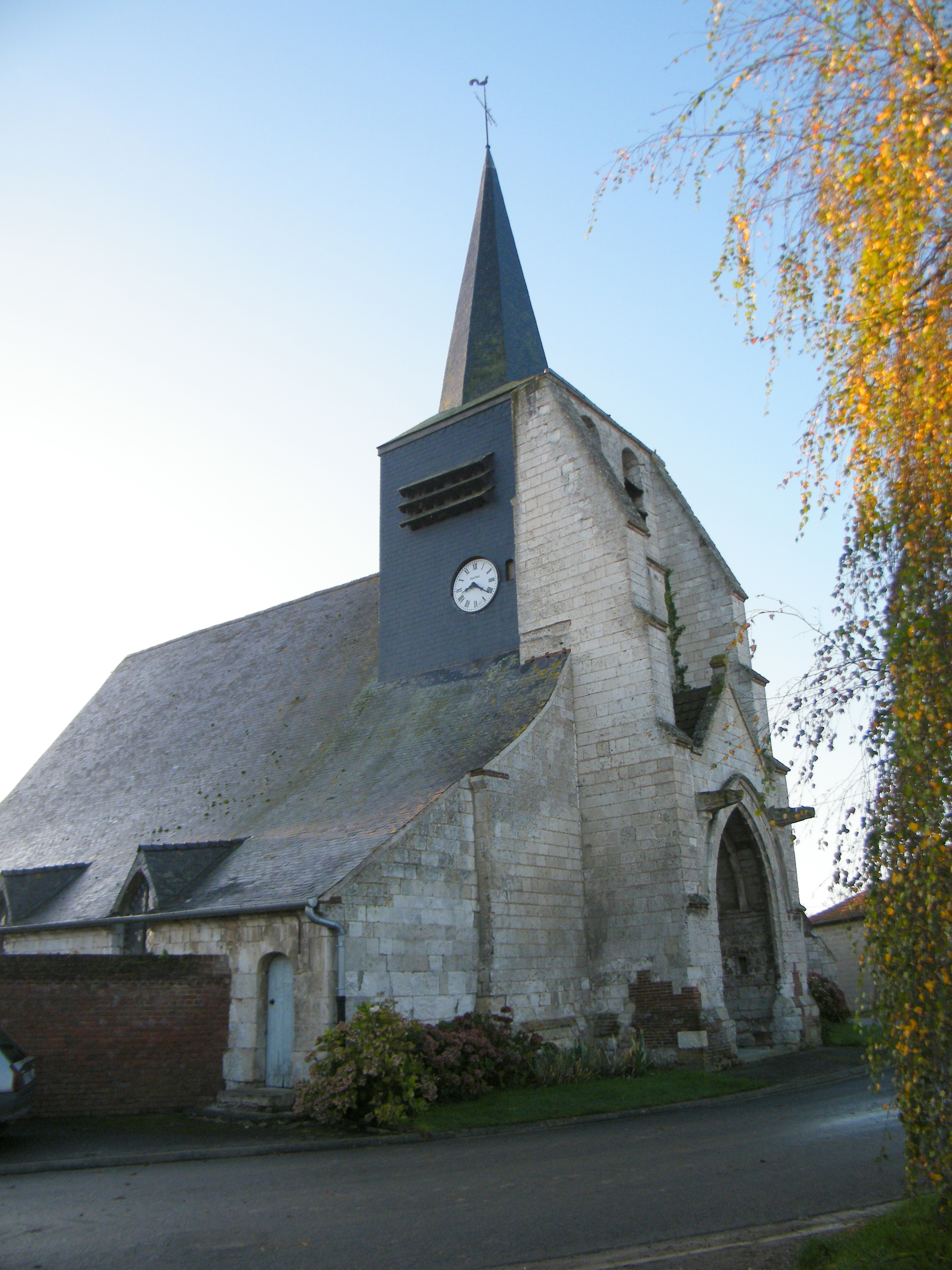
- The church in Quiry-le-Sec
- Location of Quiry-le-Sec
- Location within France Location within Hauts-de-France
- Coordinates: 49°40′24″N 2°22′58″E
- Country: France
- Region: Hauts-de-France
- Department: Somme
- Arrondissement: Montdidier
- Canton: Ailly-sur-Noye
- Intercommunality: CC Avre Luce Noye

Government
  - Mayor (2020–2026): Roseline Demorsy
- Area^{1}: 6.88 km^{2} (2.66 sq mi)
- Elevation: 156 m (512 ft)
- Highest elevation: 157 m (515 ft)
- Lowest elevation: 100 m (330 ft)
- Population (2023): 311
  - Density: 45.2/km^{2} (117/sq mi)
- Time zone: UTC+01:00 (CET)
  - Summer (DST): UTC+02:00 (CEST)
- INSEE/Postal code: 80657 /80250
- ^{1} French Land Register data, which excludes lakes, ponds, glaciers > 1 km^{2} (0.386 sq mi or 247 acres) and river estuaries.

Quiry-le-Sec (French pronunciation: [kiʁi lə sɛk]; Picard: Tchéry) is a commune in the Somme department in Hauts-de-France in northern France.

== Geography ==
The commune is situated on the D109 road, 26 kilometres (16 mi) south of Amiens.

== Population ==
Historical population
Year	Pop.	±% p.a.
1968	293	—
1975	251	−2.19%
1982	210	−2.52%
1990	229	+1.09%
1999	270	+1.85%
2007	301	+1.37%
2012	321	+1.29%
2017	325	+0.25%
2023	311	−0.73%
Source: INSEE

== See also ==
- Communes of the Somme department
