= Esclainvillers =

- Commune
- Location of Esclainvillers
- Location within France Location within Hauts-de-France
- Coordinates: 49°41′26″N 2°23′43″E
- Country: France
- Region: Hauts-de-France
- Department: Somme
- Arrondissement: Montdidier
- Canton: Ailly-sur-Noye
- Intercommunality: CC Avre Luce Noye

Government
  - Mayor (2020–2026): Alain Surhomme
- Area^{1}: 5.58 km^{2} (2.15 sq mi)
- Elevation: 138 m (453 ft)
- Highest elevation: 158 m (518 ft)
- Lowest elevation: 95 m (312 ft)
- Population (2023): 159
  - Density: 28.5/km^{2} (73.8/sq mi)
- Time zone: UTC+01:00 (CET)
  - Summer (DST): UTC+02:00 (CEST)
- INSEE/Postal code: 80283 /80250
- ^{1} French Land Register data, which excludes lakes, ponds, glaciers > 1 km^{2} (0.386 sq mi or 247 acres) and river estuaries.

Esclainvillers (Picard: Éclainvilé ) is a commune in the Somme department in Hauts-de-France in northern France.

== Geography ==
Esclainvillers is situated on the D118 road, some 15 miles (24 km) south of Amiens.

== Population ==
Historical population
Year	Pop.	±% p.a.
1968	117	—
1975	117	+0.00%
1982	114	−0.37%
1990	125	+1.16%
1999	130	+0.44%
2007	139	+0.84%
2012	156	+2.33%
2017	167	+1.37%
2023	159	−0.81%
Source: INSEE

== See also ==
- Communes of the Somme department
