= Rocquencourt, Oise =

Rocquencourt
- Commune
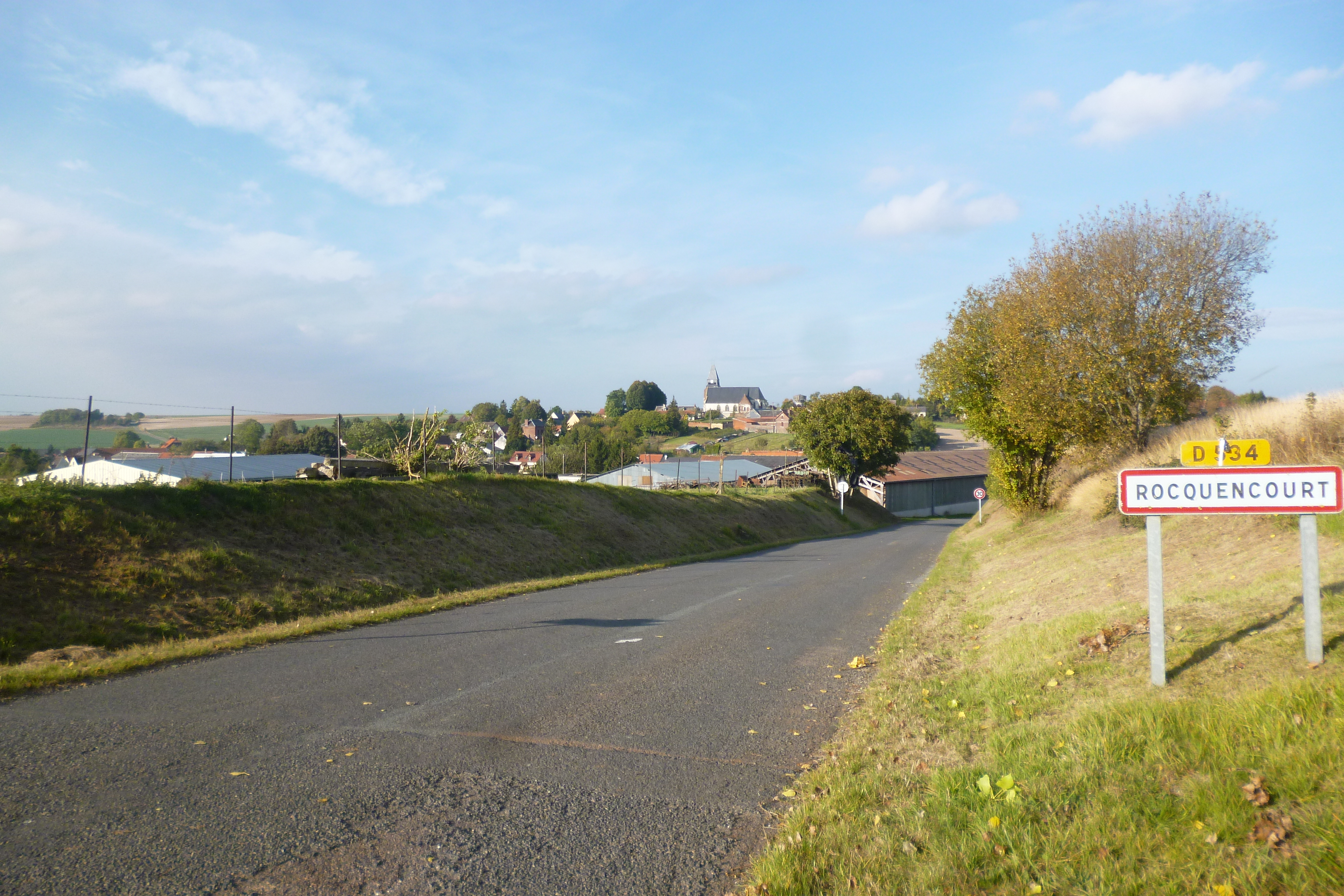
- The road into Rocquencourt
- Location of Rocquencourt
- Location within France Location within Hauts-de-France
- Coordinates: 49°39′00″N 2°25′06″E
- Country: France
- Region: Hauts-de-France
- Department: Oise
- Arrondissement: Clermont
- Canton: Saint-Just-en-Chaussée

Government
  - Mayor (2020–2026): Philippe Guilbert
- Area^{1}: 9.81 km^{2} (3.79 sq mi)
- Elevation: 129 m (423 ft)
- Highest elevation: 151 m (495 ft)
- Lowest elevation: 81 m (266 ft)
- Population (2023): 184
  - Density: 18.8/km^{2} (48.6/sq mi)
- Time zone: UTC+01:00 (CET)
  - Summer (DST): UTC+02:00 (CEST)
- INSEE/Postal code: 60544 /60120
- ^{1} French Land Register data, which excludes lakes, ponds, glaciers > 1 km^{2} (0.386 sq mi or 247 acres) and river estuaries.

Rocquencourt (French pronunciation: [ʁɔkɑ̃kuʁ]) is a commune in the Oise department in northern France.

== See also ==
- Communes of the Oise department
