= Canton of Hallencourt =

Coordinates: 49°59′32″N 1°52′40″E

Hallencourt
- Former canton
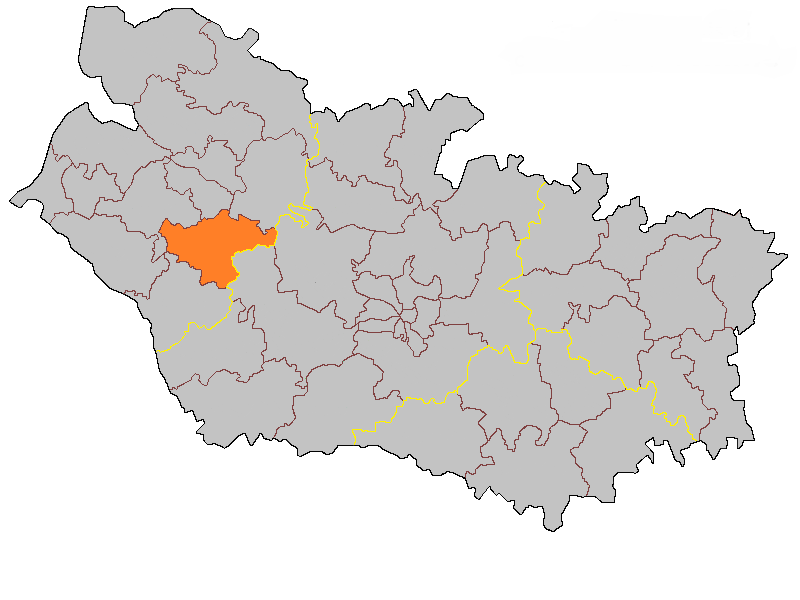
- Country: France
- Region: Hauts-de-France
- Department: Somme
- No. of communes: {{{nbcomm}}}
- Disbanded: 2015
- Area: 133.15 km^{2} (51.41 sq mi)
- Population (2012): 7,849
  - Density: 58.95/km^{2} (152.7/sq mi)

The Canton of Hallencourt is a former canton situated in the department of the Somme and the Picardie region of northern France. It was disbanded following the French canton reorganisation which came into effect in March 2015. It consisted of 16 communes, which joined the canton of Gamaches in 2015. It had 7,849 inhabitants (2012).

== Geography ==
The canton is organised around the commune of Hallencourt in the arrondissement of Abbeville. The altitude varies from 6 m at Érondelle to 127 m at Allery for an average of 59 m.

The canton comprised 16 communes:

- Allery
- Bailleul
- Citerne
- Doudelainville
- Érondelle
- Fontaine-sur-Somme
- Frucourt
- Hallencourt
- Huppy
- Liercourt
- Limeux
- Longpré-les-Corps-Saints
- Mérélessart
- Sorel-en-Vimeu
- Vaux-Marquenneville
- Wiry-au-Mont

== Population ==
Population Growth
1962	1968	1975	1982	1990	1999
7425	7607	7435	7189	6885	7051
Census count starting from 1962 : Population without double counting

== See also ==
- Arrondissements of the Somme department
- Cantons of the Somme department
- Communes of the Somme department
