= Communauté de communes de la Région d'Hallencourt =

Coordinates: 49.9916°N 1.8781°E

Région d'Hallencourt
- Former communauté de communes
- Interactive map of Région d'Hallencourt
- Country: France
- Region: Hauts-de-France
- Department: Somme
- No. of communes: {{{nbcomm}}}
- Established: 1995
- Disbanded: 2017
- Area: 143.5 km^{2} (55.4 sq mi)
- Population (1999): 7,977
  - Density: 55.59/km^{2} (144.0/sq mi)

The Communauté de communes de la Région d'Hallencourt is a former communauté de communes in the Somme département and in the Picardie région of France. It was created in December 1995. It was merged into the new Communauté d'agglomération Baie de Somme in January 2017.

== Composition ==
This Communauté de communes comprised 18 communes:

1. Allery
2. Bailleul
3. Bettencourt-Rivière
4. Citerne
5. Condé-Folie
6. Doudelainville
7. Érondelle
8. Fontaine-sur-Somme
9. Frucourt
10. Hallencourt
11. Huppy
12. Liercourt
13. Limeux
14. Longpré-les-Corps-Saints
15. Mérélessart
16. Sorel-en-Vimeu
17. Vaux-Marquenneville
18. Wiry-au-Mont

== See also ==
- Communes of the Somme department
