= List of windmills in Somme =

A list of windmills in Somme, France

Location	Name of mill	Type	Built	Notes	Photograph
Arry	Vieux moulin	Moulin Pivot		Demolished	
Ault	Moulin de Pierre	Moulin Tour		House conversion Moulins a Vent (in French)	
Bouchon	Moulin de Mouflers	Moulin Tour		Moulins a Vent (in French)	
Bussus-Bussuel	Moulin d'Hemimont	Moulin Tour		Moulins a Vent (in French)	
Candas	Moulin Fanchon	Moulin Tour	18th century	Moulins a Vent (in French)	
Citerne	Moulin d'Yonville	Moulin Tour en Bois	c. 1865	Moulins a Vent (in French)	
Dominois	Moulin de Dominois				
Eaucourt-sur-Somme	Moulin Guidon	Moulin Tour		Moulins a Vent (in French)	
Étinehem	Moulin d'Étinehem				
Flixecourt	Le Moulin Basile	Moulin Tour		Moulins a Vent (in French)	
Frucourt	Moulin Fortifié	Moulin Tour	1641	Moulins a Vent (in French)	
Grivesnes	Moulin de Grivesnes	Moulin Tour		Ruin; Moulins a Vent (in French)	
Heuzecourt	Moulin d'Heuzecourt	Moulin Tour		Moulins a Vent (in French)	
Louvencourt	Moulin de Louvencourt	Moulin Tour		Moulins a Vent (in French)	
Mons-Boubert	Moulin de Pierre	Moulin Tour		Moulins a Vent (in French)	
Morchain	Moulin Georget	Moulin Tour		Moulins a Vent (in French)	
Nampont-Saint-Martin	Moulin de Nampont St Martin	Moulin Tour			
Naours	Moulin de Belcan	Moulin Pivot		Moulins a Vent (in French)	
Naours	Moulin Westmolen	Moulin Pivot	18th century	Moulins a Vent (in French)	
Nouvion-en-Ponthieu	Moulin de Nouvion en Ponthieu	Moulin Tour		Moulins a Vent (in French)	
Ochancourt		Moulin Pivot		Blown down 1917	
Oisemont	Moulin d'Oisemont	Moulin Tour		Moulins a Vent (in French)	
Pierregot	Moulin Arrachaud	Moulin Tour	Late 18th century	Moulins a Vent (in French)	
Querrieu		Moulin Tour en Bois	1793	Demolished 1916.	
Raincheval	Moulin de Raincheval	Moulin Tour		Moulins a Vent (in French)	
Saint-Maxent	Moulin de Saint-Maxent	Moulin Pivot	1630	Moulins a Vent (in French)	
Vaudricourt	Moulin de Vaudricourt			Demolished	
Villers-sous-Ailly	Moulin de Villers	Moulin Tour		Moulins a Vent (in French)	
Warloy-Baillon	Moulin de Rolmont	Moulin Tour	15th century	Moulins a Vent (in French)	
