= Saint-Maxent =

- Commune
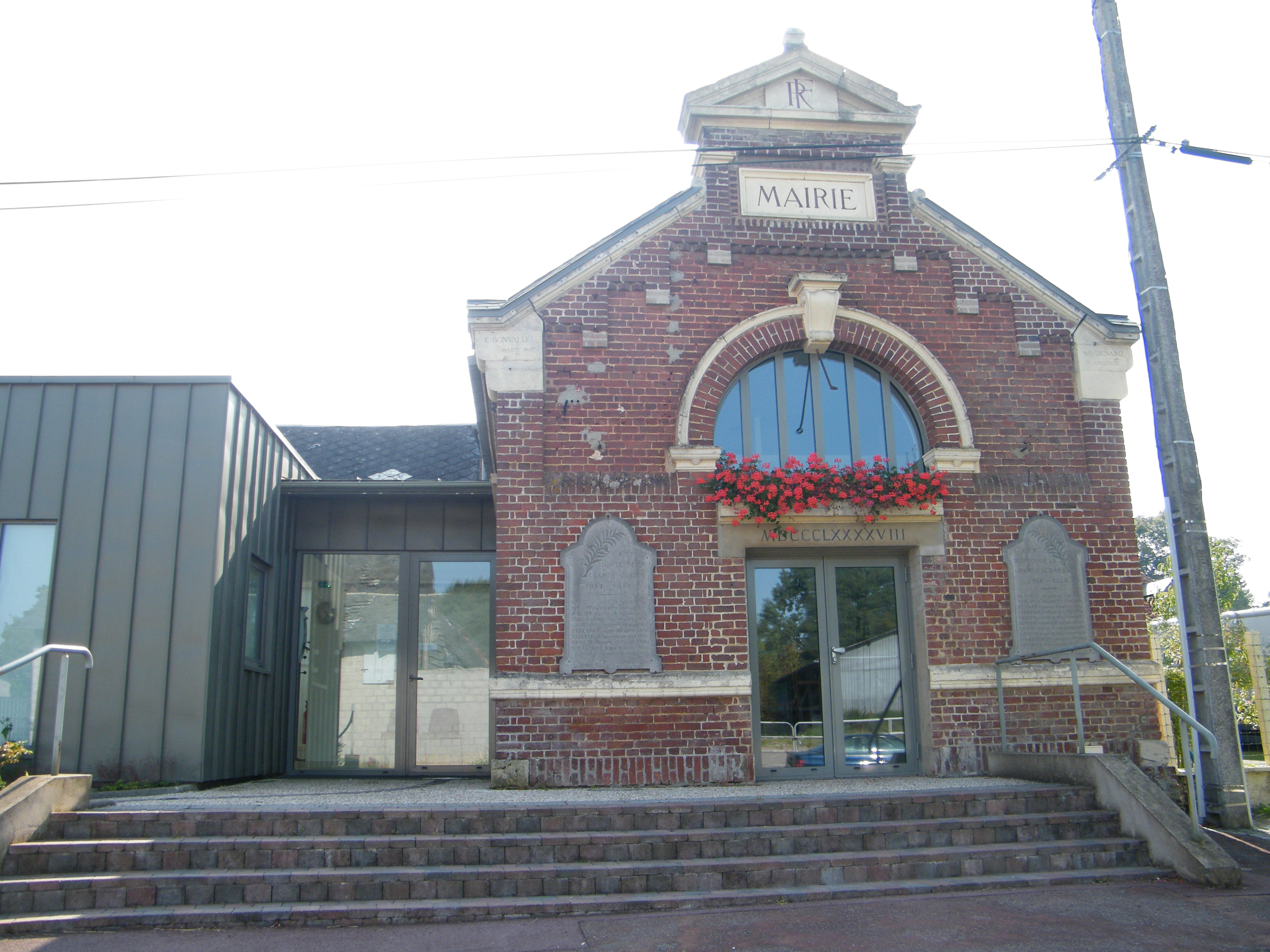
- The town hall in Saint-Maxent
- Location of Saint-Maxent
- Location within France Location within Hauts-de-France
- Coordinates: 50°00′25″N 1°43′49″E
- Country: France
- Region: Hauts-de-France
- Department: Somme
- Arrondissement: Abbeville
- Canton: Gamaches
- Intercommunality: CC Aumale - Blangy-sur-Bresle

Government
  - Mayor (2020–2026): Bernard Leneveu
- Area^{1}: 6.38 km^{2} (2.46 sq mi)
- Elevation: 114 m (374 ft)
- Highest elevation: 118 m (387 ft)
- Lowest elevation: 93 m (305 ft)
- Population (2023): 390
  - Density: 61/km^{2} (160/sq mi)
- Time zone: UTC+01:00 (CET)
  - Summer (DST): UTC+02:00 (CEST)
- INSEE/Postal code: 80710 /80140
- ^{1} French Land Register data, which excludes lakes, ponds, glaciers > 1 km^{2} (0.386 sq mi or 247 acres) and river estuaries.

Saint-Maxent (French pronunciation: [sɛ̃ maksɑ̃]; Picard: Saint-Manchin) is a commune in the Somme department in Hauts-de-France in northern France.

== Geography ==
The commune is situated some 10 miles (16 km) southwest of Abbeville, on the D86 and D29 road junction, about a mile from the A28 autoroute.

== Population ==
Historical population
Year	Pop.	±% p.a.
1968	417	—
1975	379	−1.36%
1982	365	−0.54%
1990	365	+0.00%
1999	369	+0.12%
2007	389	+0.66%
2012	404	+0.76%
2017	392	−0.60%
2023	390	−0.09%
Source: INSEE

== Places of interest ==
- The church
- The old railway line

The railway was opened on 9 May 1872 and was used principally from freight, although some passengers were carried.
It was finally closed on 10 November 1993. It served the following communes:
Longpré-les-Corps-Saints / Bettencourt-Rivière / Airaines / Allery / Wiry-au-Mont / Forceville / Oisemont / Cerisy-Buleux / Martainneville / Saint-Maxent / Vismes-au-Val / Maisnières / Longroy and Gamaches

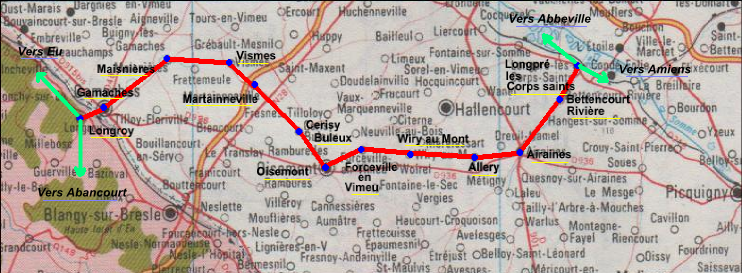

The mill of Saint-Maxent, 2006

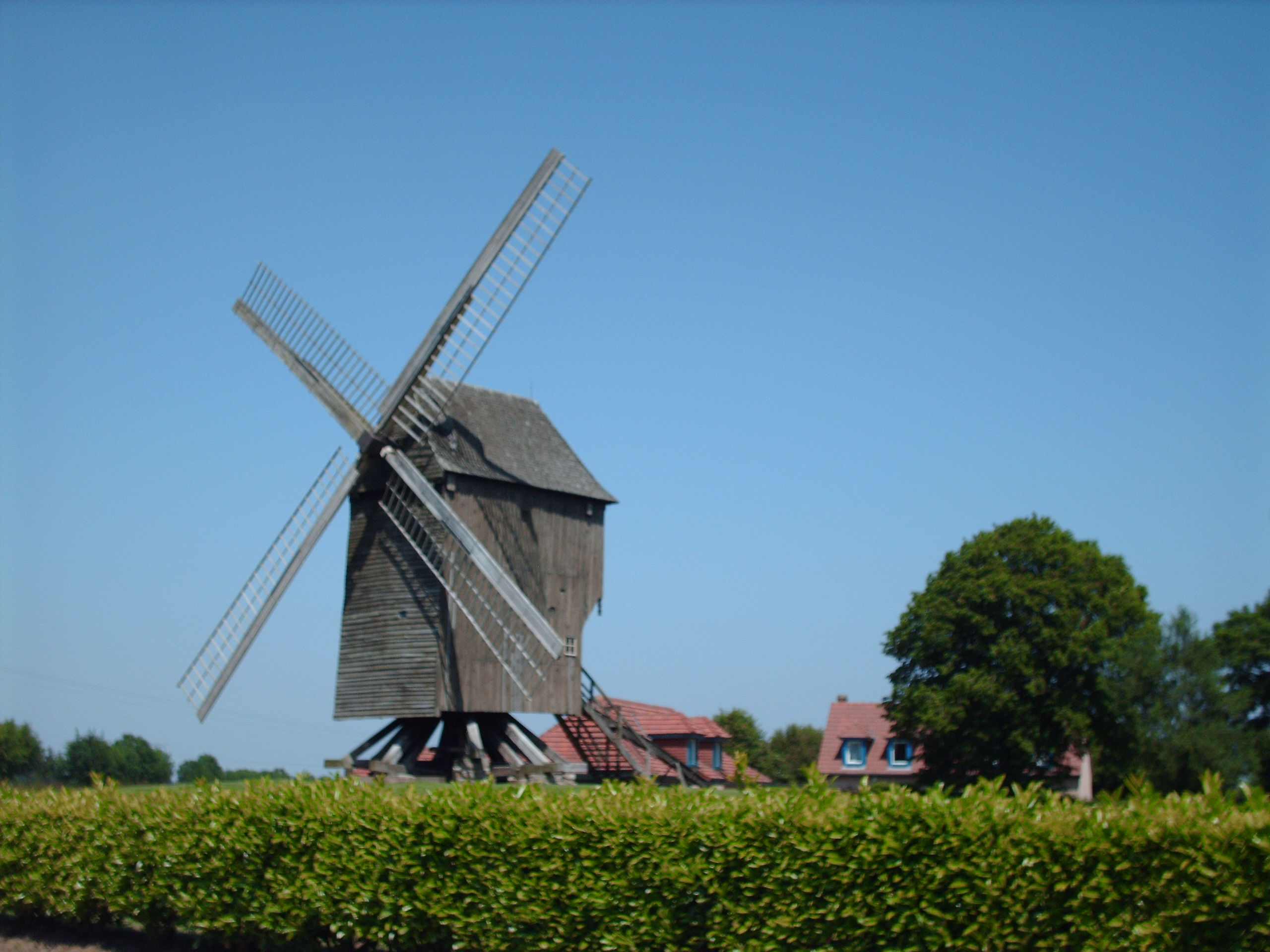

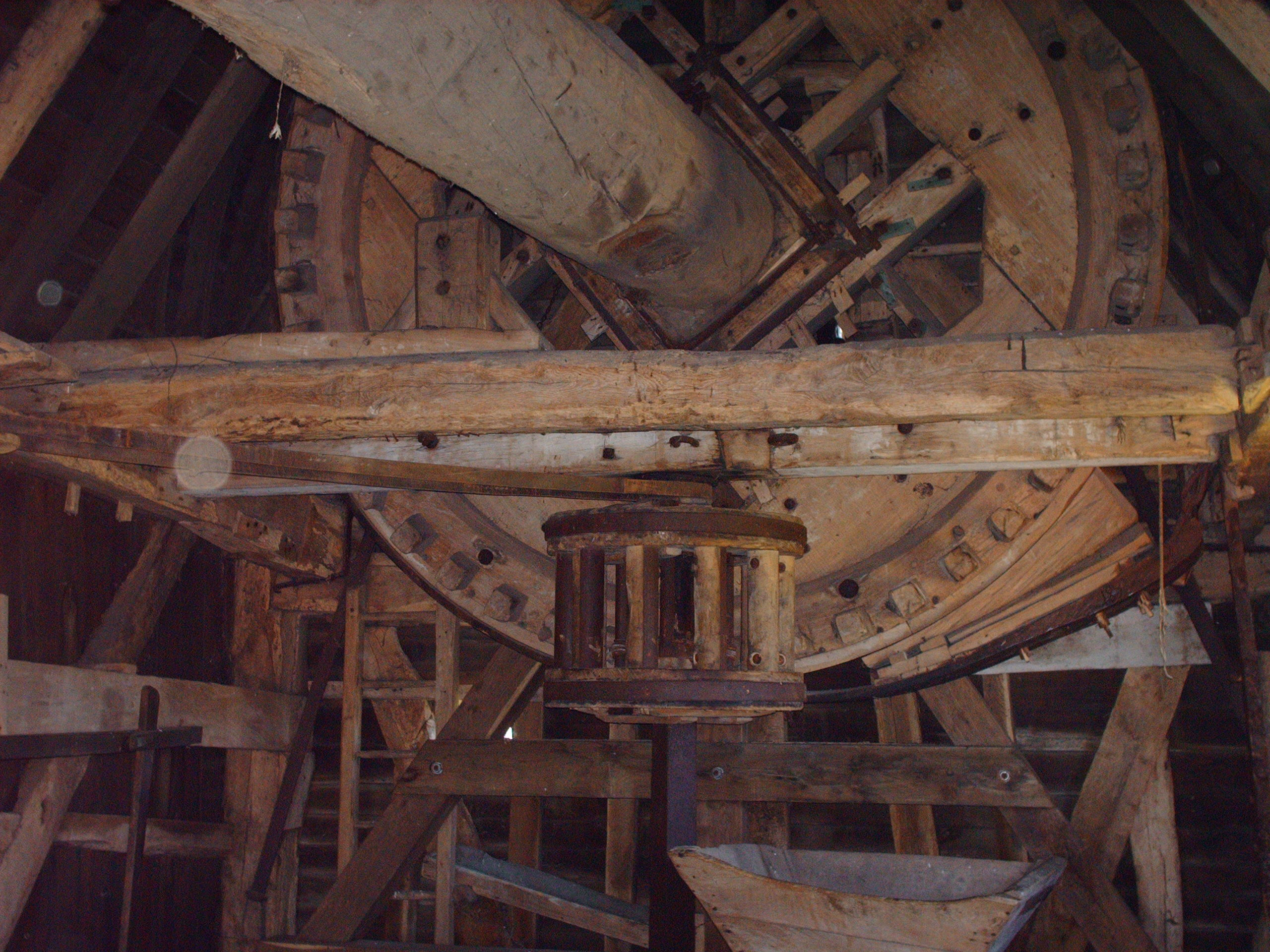

== See also ==
- Communes of the Somme department
