= Communauté de communes Baie de Somme Sud =

Coordinates: 50.1852°N 1.6284°E

Baie de Somme Sud
- Former communauté de communes
- Interactive map of Baie de Somme Sud
- Country: France
- Region: Hauts-de-France
- Department: Somme
- No. of communes: {{{nbcomm}}}
- Disbanded: 2017

The Communauté de communes Baie de Somme Sud is a former communauté de communes in the Somme département and in the Picardie région of France. It was created in December 1997. It was merged into the new Communauté d'agglomération de la Baie de Somme in January 2017.

== Composition ==
This Communauté de communes covers part of the Baie de Somme and includes 13 communes:

1. Arrest
2. Boismont
3. Brutelles
4. Cayeux-sur-Mer
5. Estrébœuf
6. Franleu
7. Lanchères
8. Mons-Boubert
9. Pendé
10. Saigneville
11. Saint-Blimont
12. Saint-Valery-sur-Somme
13. Vaudricourt

== See also ==
- Communes of the Somme department
