= Buigny-lès-Gamaches =

- Commune
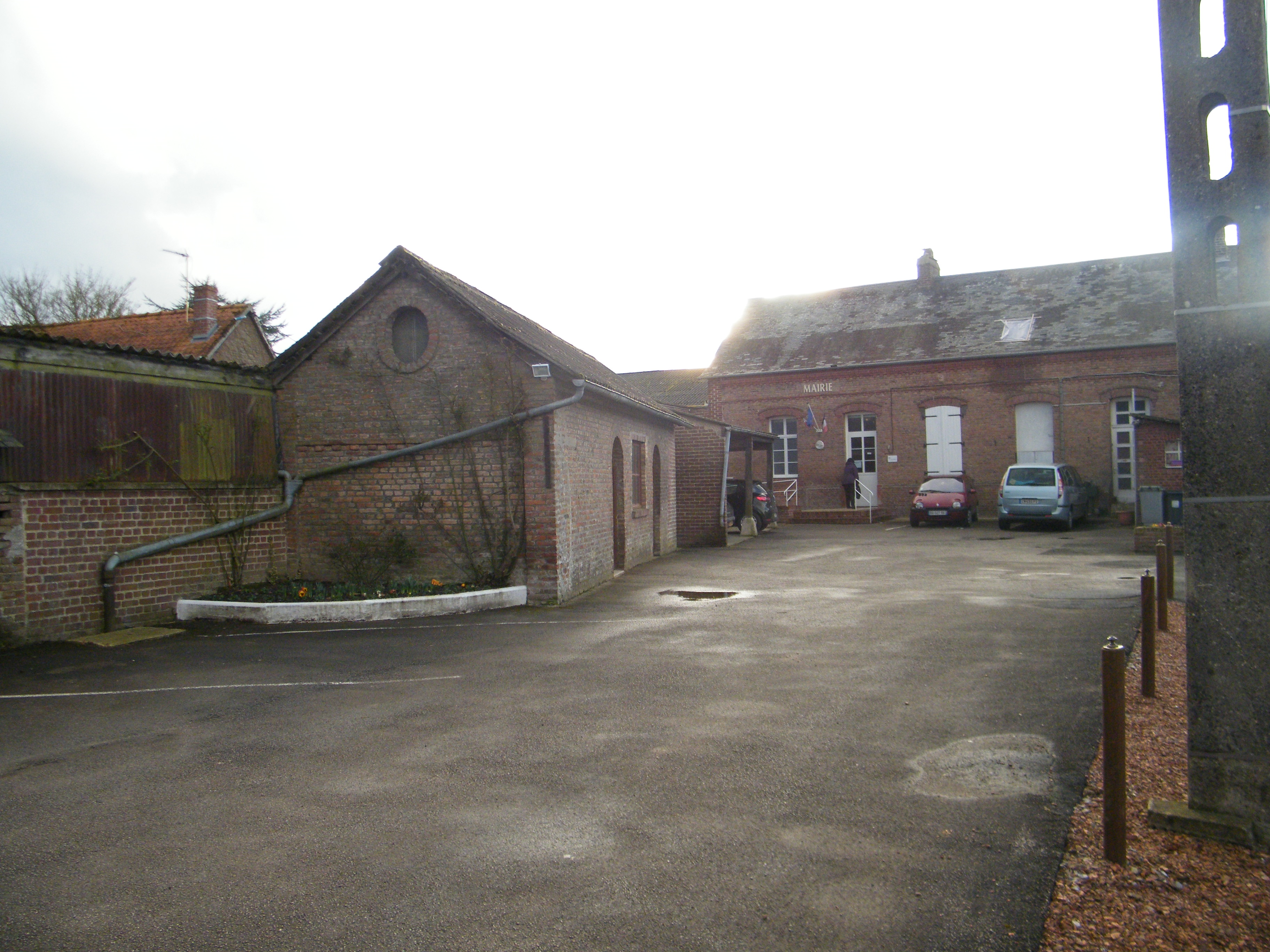
- The town hall in Buigny-lès-Gamaches
- Location of Buigny-lès-Gamaches
- Location within France Location within Hauts-de-France
- Coordinates: 50°01′30″N 1°34′03″E
- Country: France
- Region: Hauts-de-France
- Department: Somme
- Arrondissement: Abbeville
- Canton: Gamaches
- Intercommunality: CC Villes Sœurs

Government
  - Mayor (2020–2026): Jérémy Moreau
- Area^{1}: 4.77 km^{2} (1.84 sq mi)
- Elevation: 110 m (360 ft)
- Highest elevation: 116 m (381 ft)
- Lowest elevation: 84 m (276 ft)
- Population (2023): 397
  - Density: 83.2/km^{2} (216/sq mi)
- Time zone: UTC+01:00 (CET)
  - Summer (DST): UTC+02:00 (CEST)
- INSEE/Postal code: 80148 /80220
- ^{1} French Land Register data, which excludes lakes, ponds, glaciers > 1 km^{2} (0.386 sq mi or 247 acres) and river estuaries.

Buigny-lès-Gamaches (French pronunciation: [bɥiɲi lɛ ɡamaʃ], literally Buigny near Gamaches; Picard: Boégny-lès-Gamache) is a commune in the Somme department in Hauts-de-France in northern France about 32 kilometres (20 mi) southwest of Abbeville.

== Population ==
Historical population

Year	Pop.	±% p.a.
1793	405	—
1821	468	+0.52%
1846	508	+0.33%
1872	498	−0.08%
1901	431	−0.50%
1926	406	−0.24%
1946	446	+0.47%
1962	462	+0.22%
1968	461	−0.04%

Year	Pop.	±% p.a.
1975	471	+0.31%
1982	428	−1.36%
1990	440	+0.35%
1999	403	−0.97%
2007	400	−0.09%
2012	396	−0.20%
2017	414	+0.89%
2023	397	−0.70%

Source: EHESS and INSEE (1968-2023)

== See also ==
- Communes of the Somme department
