= Communauté d'agglomération de la Baie de Somme =

Coordinates: 50.10°N 1.83°E

Baie de Somme
- Communauté d'agglomération
- Country: France
- Region: Hauts-de-France
- Department: Somme
- No. of communes: {{{nbcomm}}}
- Established: 2017

Government
  - President: Nicolas Dumont
- Area: 398.6 km^{2} (153.9 sq mi)
- Population (2018): 48,903
  - Density: 122.7/km^{2} (317.8/sq mi)
- Website: www.cc-abbevillois.fr

The Communauté d'agglomération de la Baie de Somme is a communauté d'agglomération in the Somme département and in the Hauts-de-France région of France. It was formed on 1 January 2017 by the merger of the former Communauté de communes de l’Abbevillois, the Communauté de communes de la Région d'Hallencourt and the Communauté de communes Baie de Somme Sud. Its area is 398.6 km^{2}. Its population was 48,903 in 2018, of which 22,837 in Abbeville.

== Composition ==
This Communauté d'agglomération comprises 43 communes:

1. Abbeville
2. Arrest
3. Bailleul
4. Bellancourt
5. Bettencourt-Rivière
6. Boismont
7. Bray-lès-Mareuil
8. Brutelles
9. Cambron
10. Caours
11. Cayeux-sur-Mer
12. Citerne
13. Condé-Folie
14. Doudelainville
15. Drucat
16. Eaucourt-sur-Somme
17. Épagne-Épagnette
18. Érondelle
19. Estrébœuf
20. Fontaine-sur-Somme
21. Franleu
22. Frucourt
23. Grand-Laviers
24. Hallencourt
25. Huppy
26. Lanchères
27. Liercourt
28. Limeux
29. Longpré-les-Corps-Saints
30. Mareuil-Caubert
31. Mérélessart
32. Mons-Boubert
33. Neufmoulin
34. Pendé
35. Saigneville
36. Saint-Blimont
37. Saint-Valery-sur-Somme
38. Sorel-en-Vimeu
39. Vauchelles-les-Quesnoy
40. Vaudricourt
41. Vaux-Marquenneville
42. Wiry-au-Mont
43. Yonval
