= Wiry-au-Mont =

- Commune
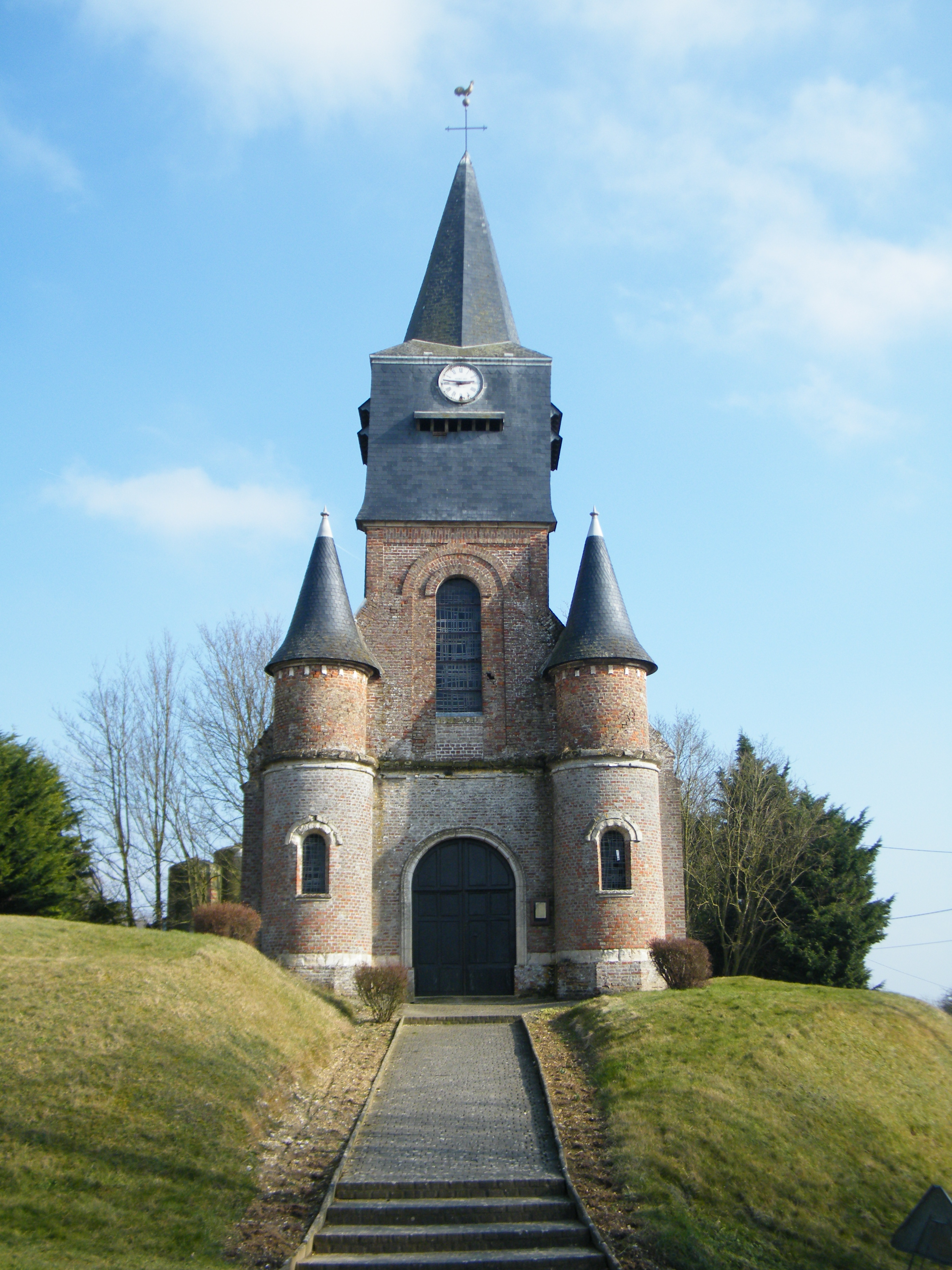
- The church in Wiry
- Location of Wiry-au-Mont
- Location within France Location within Hauts-de-France
- Coordinates: 49°57′49″N 1°50′26″E
- Country: France
- Region: Hauts-de-France
- Department: Somme
- Arrondissement: Abbeville
- Canton: Gamaches
- Intercommunality: Baie de Somme

Government
  - Mayor (2020–2026): Odile Duval
- Area^{1}: 4.81 km^{2} (1.86 sq mi)
- Elevation: 109 m (358 ft)
- Highest elevation: 119 m (390 ft)
- Lowest elevation: 45 m (148 ft)
- Population (2023): 103
  - Density: 21.4/km^{2} (55.5/sq mi)
- Time zone: UTC+01:00 (CET)
  - Summer (DST): UTC+02:00 (CEST)
- INSEE/Postal code: 80825 /80270
- ^{1} French Land Register data, which excludes lakes, ponds, glaciers > 1 km^{2} (0.386 sq mi or 247 acres) and river estuaries.

Wiry-au-Mont (French pronunciation: [wiʁi o mɔ̃]; Picard: Wéry-au-Mont) is a commune in the Somme department in Hauts-de-France in northern France.

== Geography ==
The commune is situated 16 km (10 miles) south of Abbeville, on the D936 road.

== Population ==
Historical population
Year	Pop.	±% p.a.
1968	116	—
1975	118	+0.24%
1982	111	−0.87%
1990	92	−2.32%
1999	96	+0.47%
2007	116	+2.39%
2012	124	+1.34%
2017	121	−0.49%
2023	103	−2.65%
Source: INSEE

== Places of interest ==
- The war memorial
- The old railway line

The railway was opened on 9 May 1872 and was used principally from freight, although some passengers were carried.
It was finally closed on 10 November 1993. It served the following communes:
Longpré-les-Corps-Saints / Bettencourt-Rivière / Airaines / Allery / Wiry-au-Mont / Forceville / Oisemont / Cerisy-Buleux / Martainneville / Saint-Maxent / Vismes-au-Val / Maisnières / Longroy and Gamaches

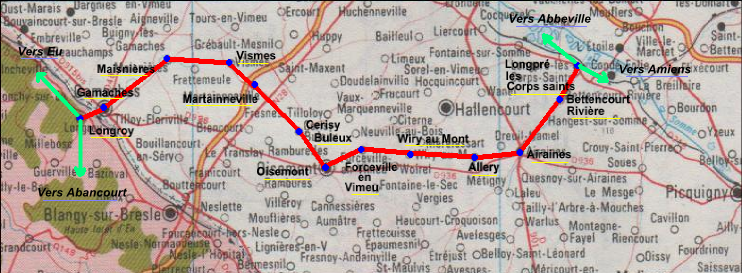

== See also ==
- Communes of the Somme department
