= Canton of Gamaches =

Coordinates: 49°59′15″N 1°33′29″E

Gamaches
- Canton
- Interactive map of Gamaches
- Country: France
- Region: Hauts-de-France
- Department: Somme
- No. of communes: {{{nbcomm}}}
- Area: 290.50 km^{2} (112.16 sq mi)
- Population (2023): 22,721
  - Density: 78.213/km^{2} (202.57/sq mi)
- INSEE code: 80 17

The Canton of Gamaches is a canton situated in the department of the Somme and in the Hauts-de-France region of northern France.

== Geography ==
The canton is organised around the commune of Gamaches.

== Composition ==
At the French canton reorganisation which came into effect in March 2015, the canton was expanded from 20 to 36 communes:

- Aigneville
- Allery
- Bailleul
- Beauchamps
- Bettencourt-Rivière
- Biencourt
- Bouillancourt-en-Séry
- Bouttencourt
- Bouvaincourt-sur-Bresle
- Buigny-lès-Gamaches
- Chépy
- Citerne
- Dargnies
- Doudelainville
- Embreville
- Érondelle
- Feuquières-en-Vimeu
- Fontaine-sur-Somme
- Frettemeule
- Frucourt
- Gamaches
- Hallencourt
- Huppy
- Liercourt
- Limeux
- Longpré-les-Corps-Saints
- Maisnières
- Martainneville
- Mérélessart
- Ramburelles
- Saint-Maxent
- Sorel-en-Vimeu
- Tilloy-Floriville
- Vaux-Marquenneville
- Vismes
- Wiry-au-Mont

== Population ==
Historical population
| Year | Pop. | ±% p.a. |
|---|---|---|
| 2013 | 23,945 | — |
| 2018 | 23,443 | −0.42% |
Source: INSEE

== See also ==
- Somme
- Arrondissements of the Somme department
- Cantons of the Somme department
- Communes of the Somme department
