= Boismont, Somme =

Boismont
- Commune
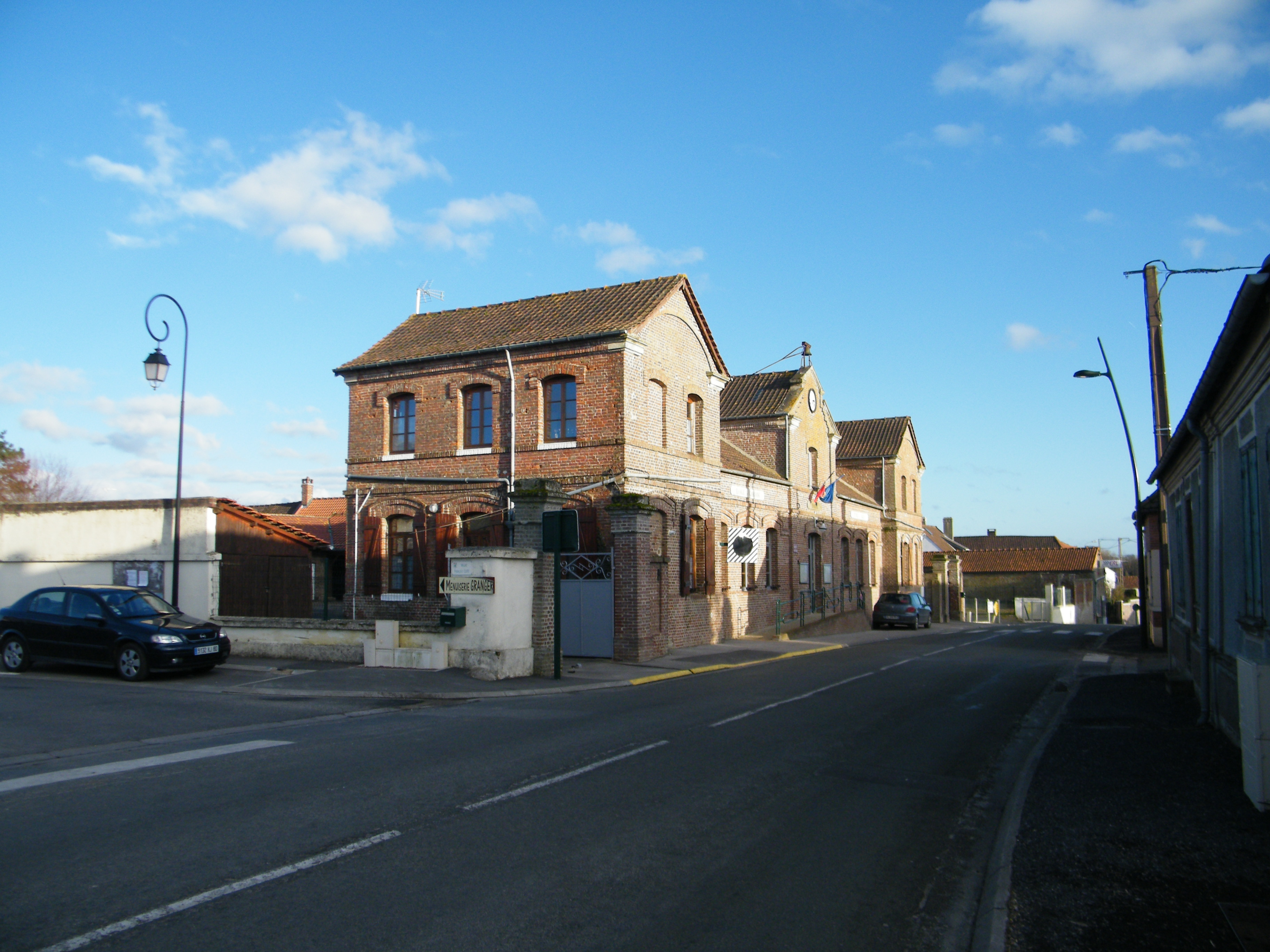
- The town hall and school in Boismont

- Coat of arms
- Location of Boismont
- Location within France Location within Hauts-de-France
- Coordinates: 50°09′12″N 1°41′10″E
- Country: France
- Region: Hauts-de-France
- Department: Somme
- Arrondissement: Abbeville
- Canton: Abbeville-2
- Intercommunality: CA Baie de Somme

Government
  - Mayor (2020–2026): Daniel Lenne
- Area^{1}: 15.57 km^{2} (6.01 sq mi)
- Elevation: 45 m (148 ft)
- Highest elevation: 46 m (151 ft)
- Lowest elevation: 0 m (0 ft)
- Population (2023): 441
  - Density: 28.3/km^{2} (73.4/sq mi)
- Time zone: UTC+01:00 (CET)
  - Summer (DST): UTC+02:00 (CEST)
- INSEE/Postal code: 80110 /80230
- ^{1} French Land Register data, which excludes lakes, ponds, glaciers > 1 km^{2} (0.386 sq mi or 247 acres) and river estuaries.

Boismont (French pronunciation: [bwamɔ̃]) is a commune in the Somme department in Hauts-de-France in northern France.

== Geography ==
The commune is situated on the D3 road, some 5 miles (8 km) northwest of Abbeville and close to the estuary of the river Somme.

== Population ==
Historical population
Year	Pop.	±% p.a.
1968	511	—
1975	509	−0.06%
1982	526	+0.47%
1990	551	+0.58%
1999	497	−1.14%
2007	464	−0.86%
2012	475	+0.47%
2017	475	+0.00%
2023	441	−1.23%
Source: INSEE

== See also ==
- Communes of the Somme department
