= Vaux-Marquenneville =

- Commune
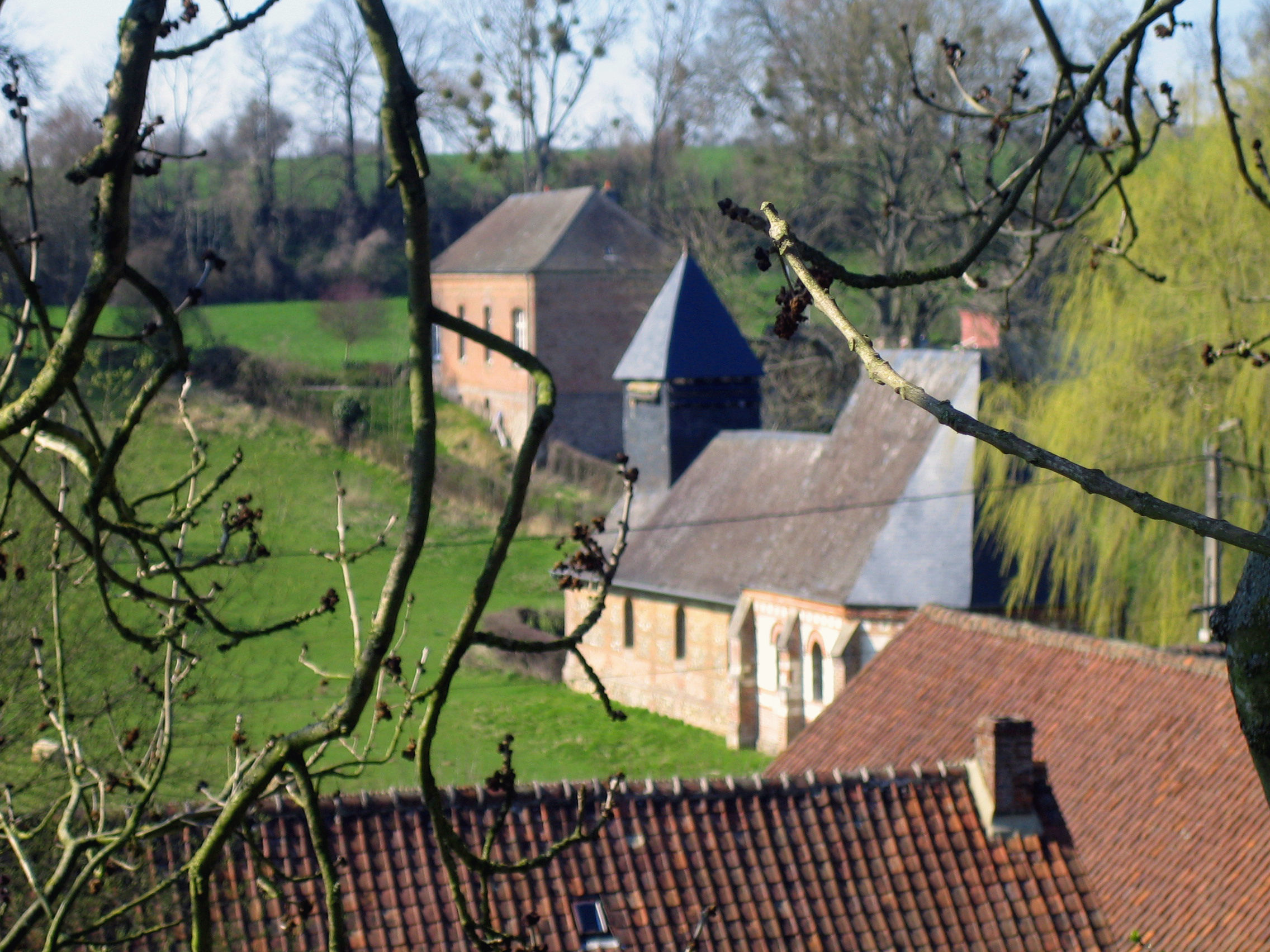
- South face of the church, with the town hall behind

- Coat of arms
- Location of Vaux-Marquenneville
- Location within France Location within Hauts-de-France
- Coordinates: 49°59′08″N 1°47′10″E
- Country: France
- Region: Hauts-de-France
- Department: Somme
- Arrondissement: Abbeville
- Canton: Gamaches
- Intercommunality: CA Baie de Somme

Government
  - Mayor (2020–2026): Jean-François Langlet
- Area^{1}: 3.97 km^{2} (1.53 sq mi)
- Elevation: 152 m (499 ft)
- Highest elevation: 122 m (400 ft)
- Lowest elevation: 70 m (230 ft)
- Population (2023): 79
  - Density: 20/km^{2} (52/sq mi)
- Time zone: UTC+01:00 (CET)
  - Summer (DST): UTC+02:00 (CEST)
- INSEE/Postal code: 80783 /80140
- ^{1} French Land Register data, which excludes lakes, ponds, glaciers > 1 km^{2} (0.386 sq mi or 247 acres) and river estuaries.

Vaux-Marquenneville (French pronunciation: [vo maʁkɛnvil]; Picard: Veux-Martchéneville) is a commune in the Somme department in Hauts-de-France in northern France.

== Geography ==
The commune is situated 8 miles (13 km) south of Abbeville, on the D93 road. The name Vaux derives from "vale" or "valley" and Marquenneville comes from the domain of someone called Marca. The inhabitants are known as Vallois in French.

== Population ==
Historical population

Year	Pop.	±% p.a.
1793	199	—
1851	197	−0.02%
1901	140	−0.68%
1936	117	−0.51%
1946	83	−3.38%
1954	98	+2.10%
1962	74	−3.45%
1968	78	+0.88%

Year	Pop.	±% p.a.
1975	75	−0.56%
1982	62	−2.68%
1990	72	+1.89%
1999	67	−0.80%
2007	82	+2.56%
2012	73	−2.30%
2017	87	+3.57%
2023	79	−1.59%

Source: EHESS and INSEE (1968-2023)

== History ==
Known by many variants of the current name throughout the centuries: 1166: Vaux, 1557 Vaulx, 1757 Vaux 1284 Marquienvilla, 1301 Marchaigneville, 1312 Markaigneville, 1340 Markainneville, 1388 Marquenneville

The Knights Templar were established nearby at Oisemont and had a farm at Vaux

The first known seigneurs were the Riencourt family
In 1790 the commune came under the management of the department of the Somme and in 1793 the town of Vaux (after 1801: Vaux-Marquenneville) was integrated into the arrondissement of Abbeville and the canton of Saint-Maxent, and after 1801 the canton of Hallencourt.

The town was occupied, as were many French towns and villages, by the German army during World War II. In 1943 work began to build a V1 missile launch ramp at "Le Mont" in Marquenneville.

A German army deserter hid in a hangar under a pile of wheat and after fruitless search by the Wehrmacht, the soldier, with the help of the French Resistance escaped from France to Spain and return to his own home.

In June 1944. the V1 ramps were destroyed by No. 485 Squadron RNZAF. The bombardment lasted one and a half hours (from 15h45 to 17h15).
The village was liberated by a Canadian tank regiment in 1944.
Vaux-Marquenneville received the Croix de Guerre with Bronze Star from the Secretary of State for War who said: "This courageous village, badly damaged during the Second World War, was delivered by faith and hard work".

== Places of interest ==
- The sixteenth century church. The Riencourt family tomb is inside
- The war memorial is on the left of the entrance to the church graveyard.
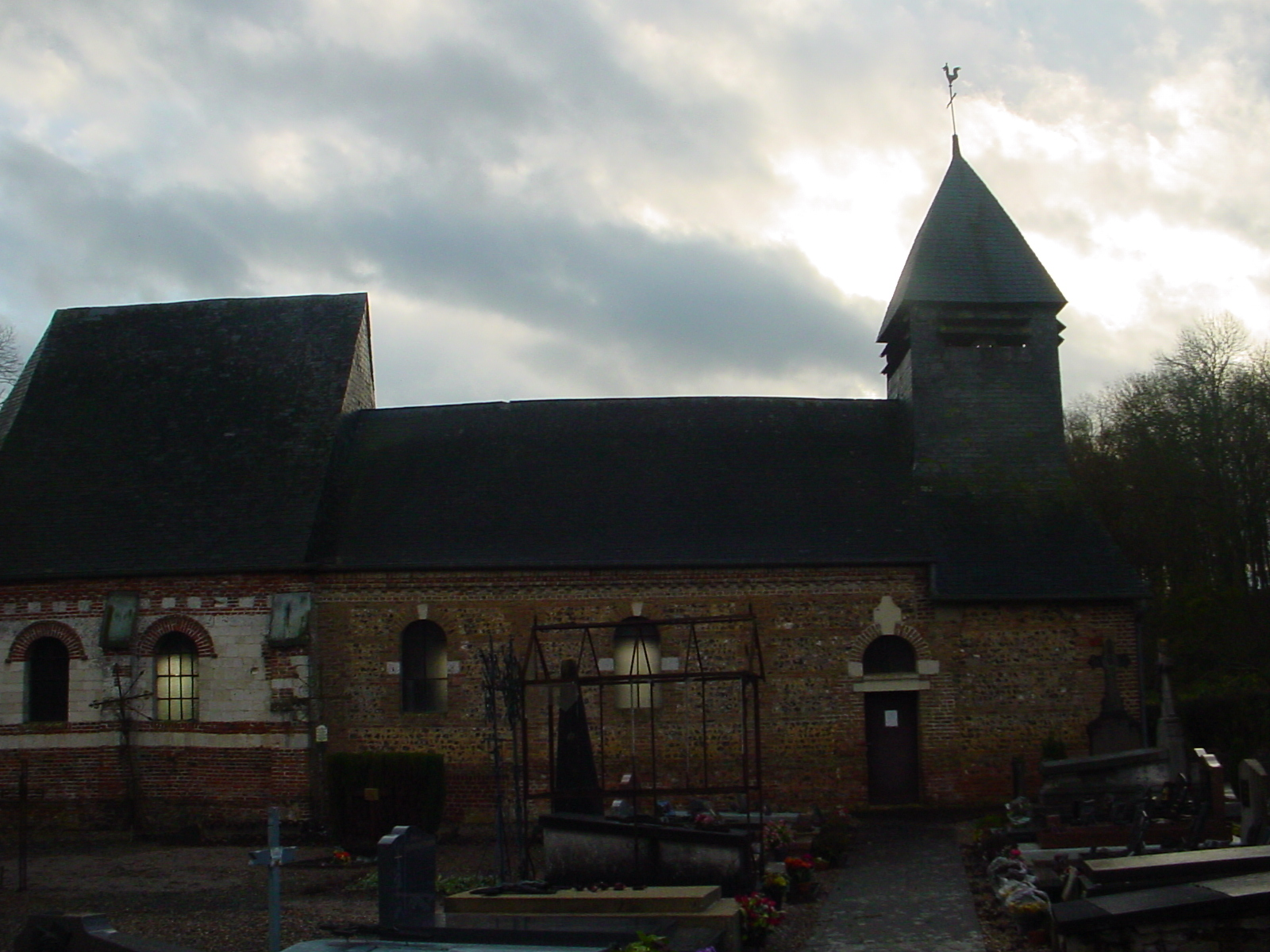
Church of Vaux-Marquenneville

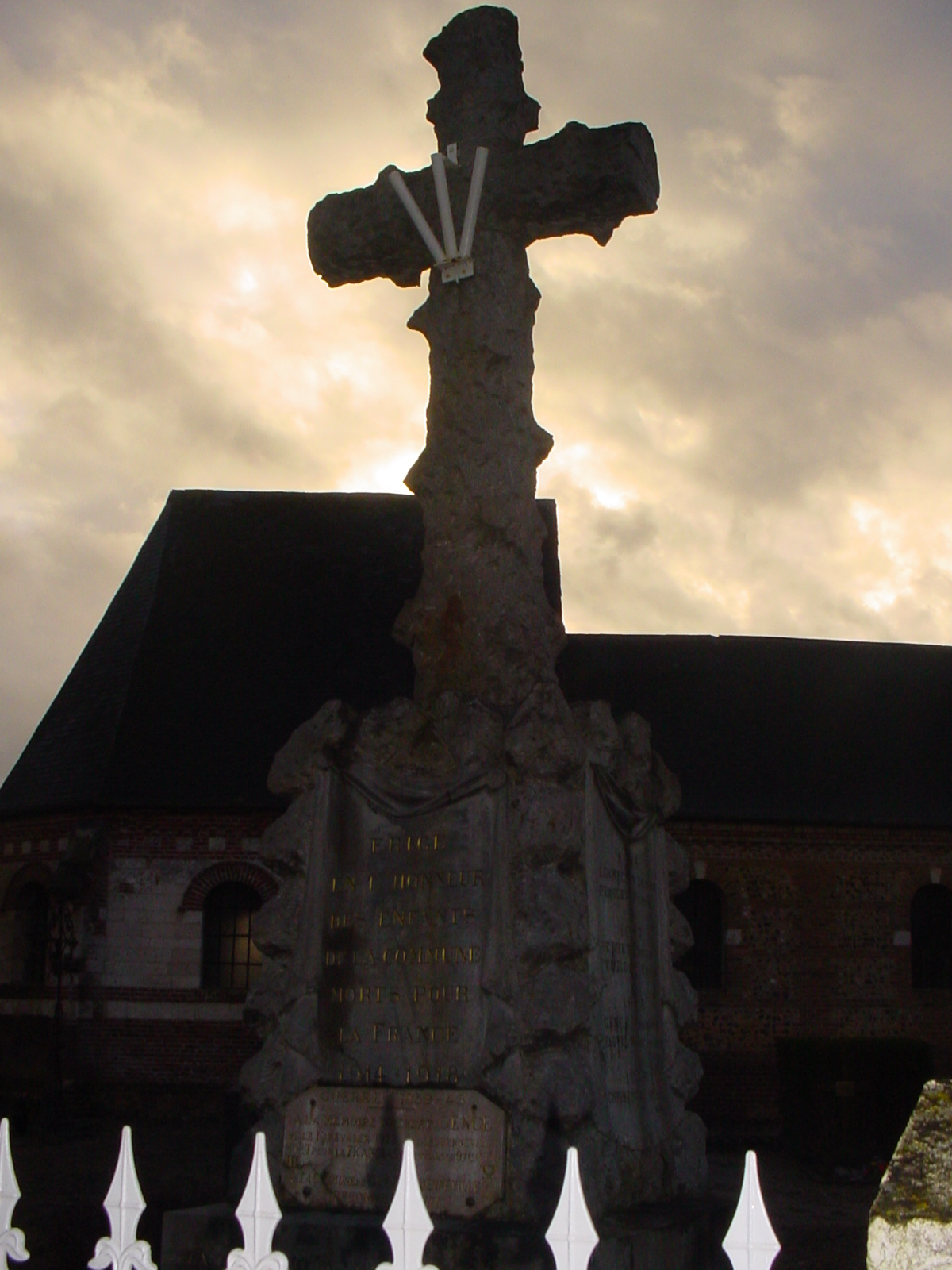
The war memorial

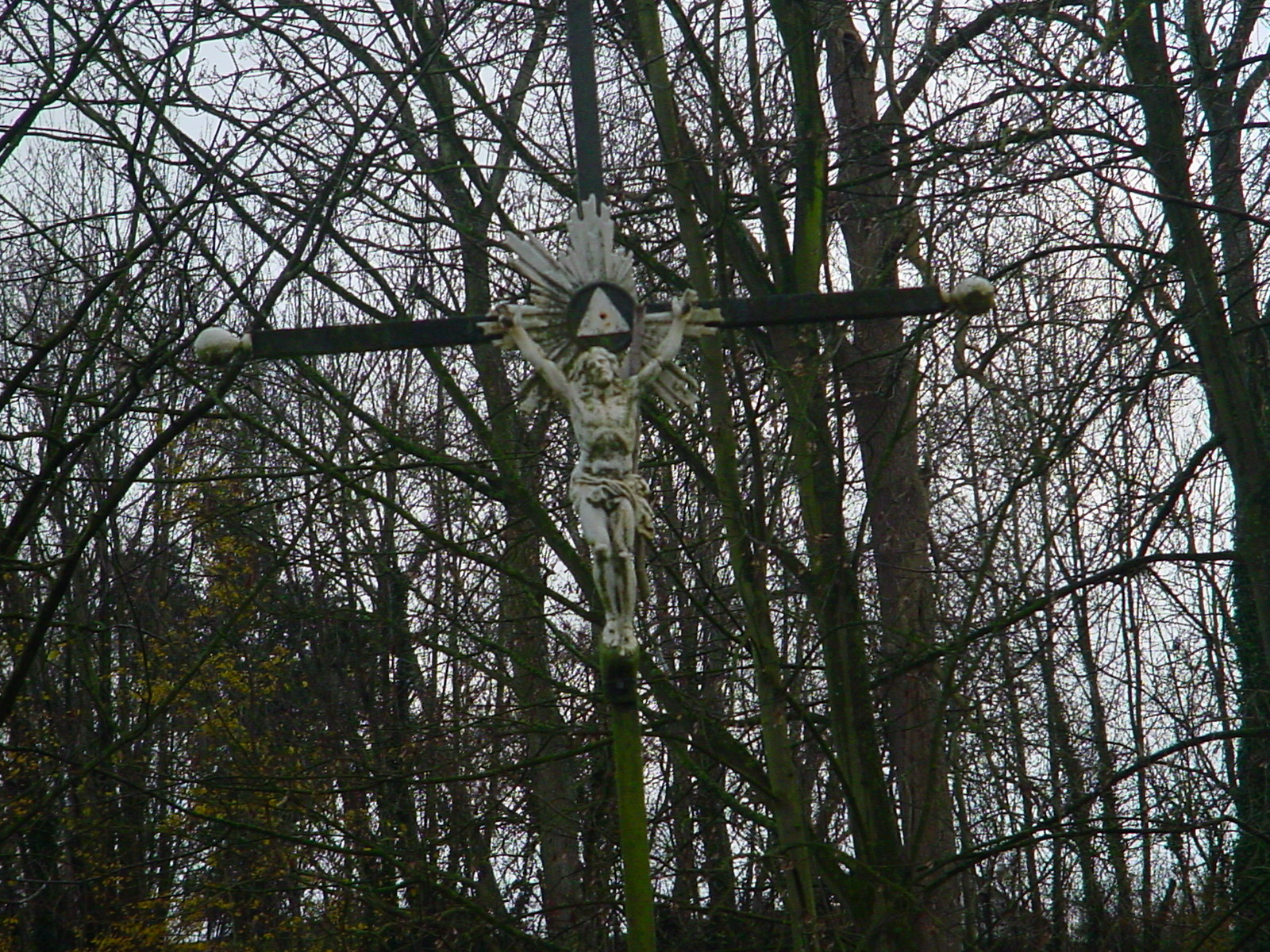
A cross
- The manor with a 17th-century dovecote.
- Another dovecote of the same period can be found at another farm in the village.
- The school and mairie
- 1834: The presbytery serves as a school and communal housing. The annual salary of the teacher was 200 francs.
- 1838-1855: Renovation of the school.
- 1861: Separation of boys and girls by a partition.
- 1873: Collapse of the west side and part of the roof.
- 1876: Introduction of the municipal library in the school.
- 1883: Establishment of the Fund Schools.
- 1889-1890: Construction of the new mixed school (now the mairie).
- Since the 1960s, the school has been closed but the building is still used as the mairie.

== See also ==
- Communes of the Somme department
