= Martainneville =

- Commune
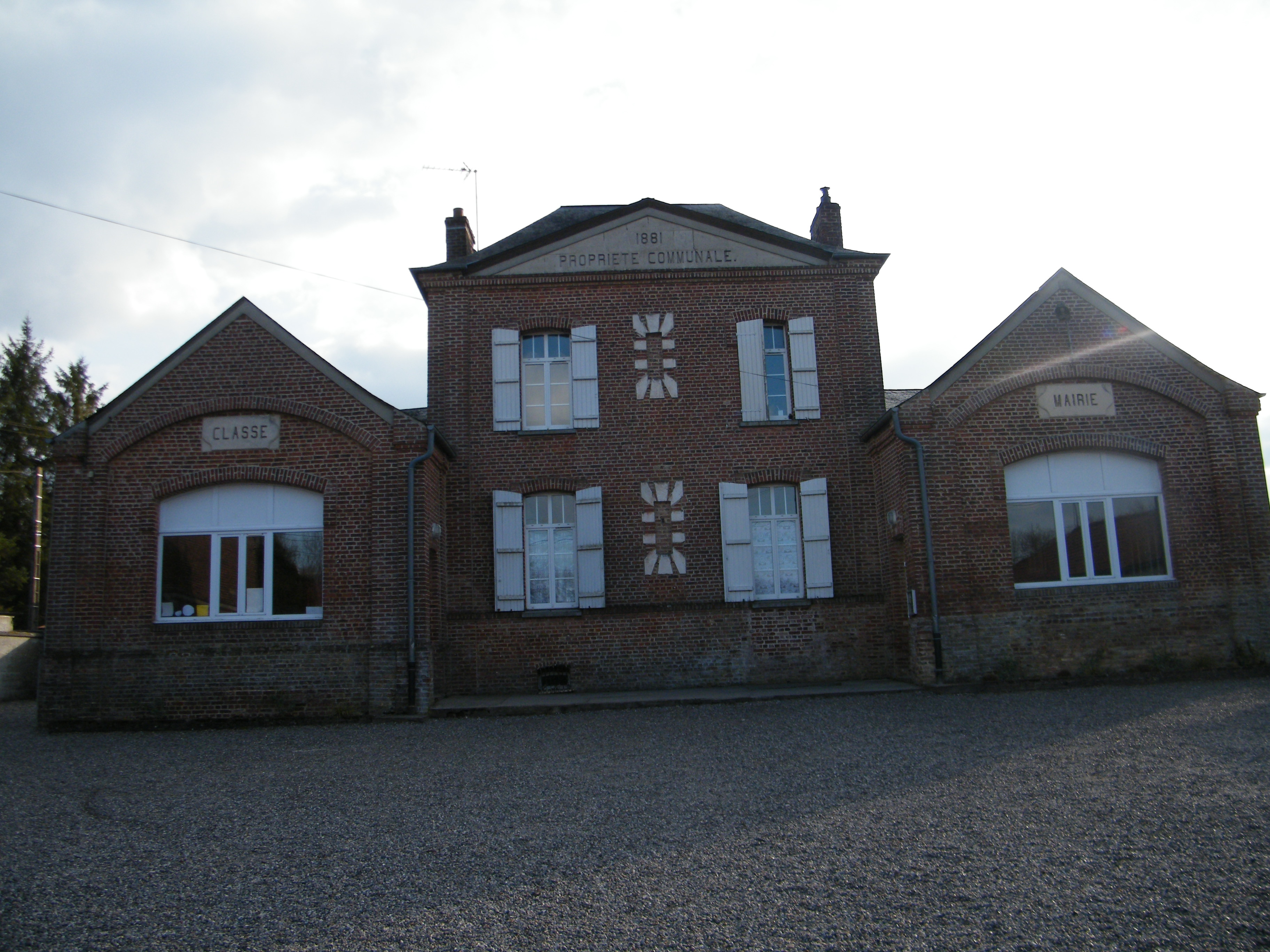
- The town hall and school in Martainneville

- Coat of arms
- Location of Martainneville
- Location within France Location within Hauts-de-France
- Coordinates: 50°00′03″N 1°42′27″E
- Country: France
- Region: Hauts-de-France
- Department: Somme
- Arrondissement: Abbeville
- Canton: Gamaches
- Intercommunality: CC Aumale - Blangy-sur-Bresle

Government
  - Mayor (2020–2026): Jean-Jacques Nantois
- Area^{1}: 7.58 km^{2} (2.93 sq mi)
- Elevation: 98 m (322 ft)
- Highest elevation: 114 m (374 ft)
- Lowest elevation: 84 m (276 ft)
- Population (2023): 410
  - Density: 54/km^{2} (140/sq mi)
- Time zone: UTC+01:00 (CET)
  - Summer (DST): UTC+02:00 (CEST)
- INSEE/Postal code: 80518 /80140
- ^{1} French Land Register data, which excludes lakes, ponds, glaciers > 1 km^{2} (0.386 sq mi or 247 acres) and river estuaries.

Martainneville (French pronunciation: [maʁtɛ̃nvil]; Picard: Martchainneville) is a commune in the Somme department in Hauts-de-France in northern France.

== Geography ==
Martainneville is situated on the D190 road, some 10 miles (16 km) southwest of Abbeville. The railway line, opened in 1872, that moved both freight and passengers, is now closed (in 1993).

== Population ==
Historical population
Year	Pop.	±% p.a.
1968	400	—
1975	384	−0.58%
1982	334	−1.97%
1990	321	−0.50%
1999	343	+0.74%
2007	379	+1.26%
2012	424	+2.27%
2017	422	−0.09%
2023	410	−0.48%
Source: INSEE

== See also ==
- Communes of the Somme department
