= Érondelle =

- Commune
- Location of Érondelle
- Location within France Location within Hauts-de-France
- Coordinates: 50°03′10″N 1°53′01″E
- Country: France
- Region: Hauts-de-France
- Department: Somme
- Arrondissement: Abbeville
- Canton: Gamaches
- Intercommunality: CA Baie de Somme

Government
  - Mayor (2020–2026): Claude Jacob
- Area^{1}: 4 km^{2} (1.5 sq mi)
- Elevation: 16 m (52 ft)
- Highest elevation: 87 m (285 ft)
- Lowest elevation: 6 m (20 ft)
- Population (2023): 504
  - Density: 130/km^{2} (330/sq mi)
- Time zone: UTC+01:00 (CET)
  - Summer (DST): UTC+02:00 (CEST)
- INSEE/Postal code: 80282 /80580
- ^{1} French Land Register data, which excludes lakes, ponds, glaciers > 1 km^{2} (0.386 sq mi or 247 acres) and river estuaries.

Érondelle (French pronunciation: [eʁɔ̃dɛl]; Picard: Érondé) is a commune in the Somme department in Hauts-de-France in northern France.

== Geography ==
Érondelle is situated on the D218e road, and the banks of the river Somme, some 9 km (5.6 mi) southeast of Abbeville.

== Population ==
Historical population
Year	Pop.	±% p.a.
1968	321	—
1975	362	+1.73%
1982	412	+1.87%
1990	424	+0.36%
1999	434	+0.26%
2007	505	+1.91%
2012	491	−0.56%
2017	511	+0.80%
2023	504	−0.23%
Source: INSEE

== See also ==
- Communes of the Somme department
