= Mérélessart =

- Commune
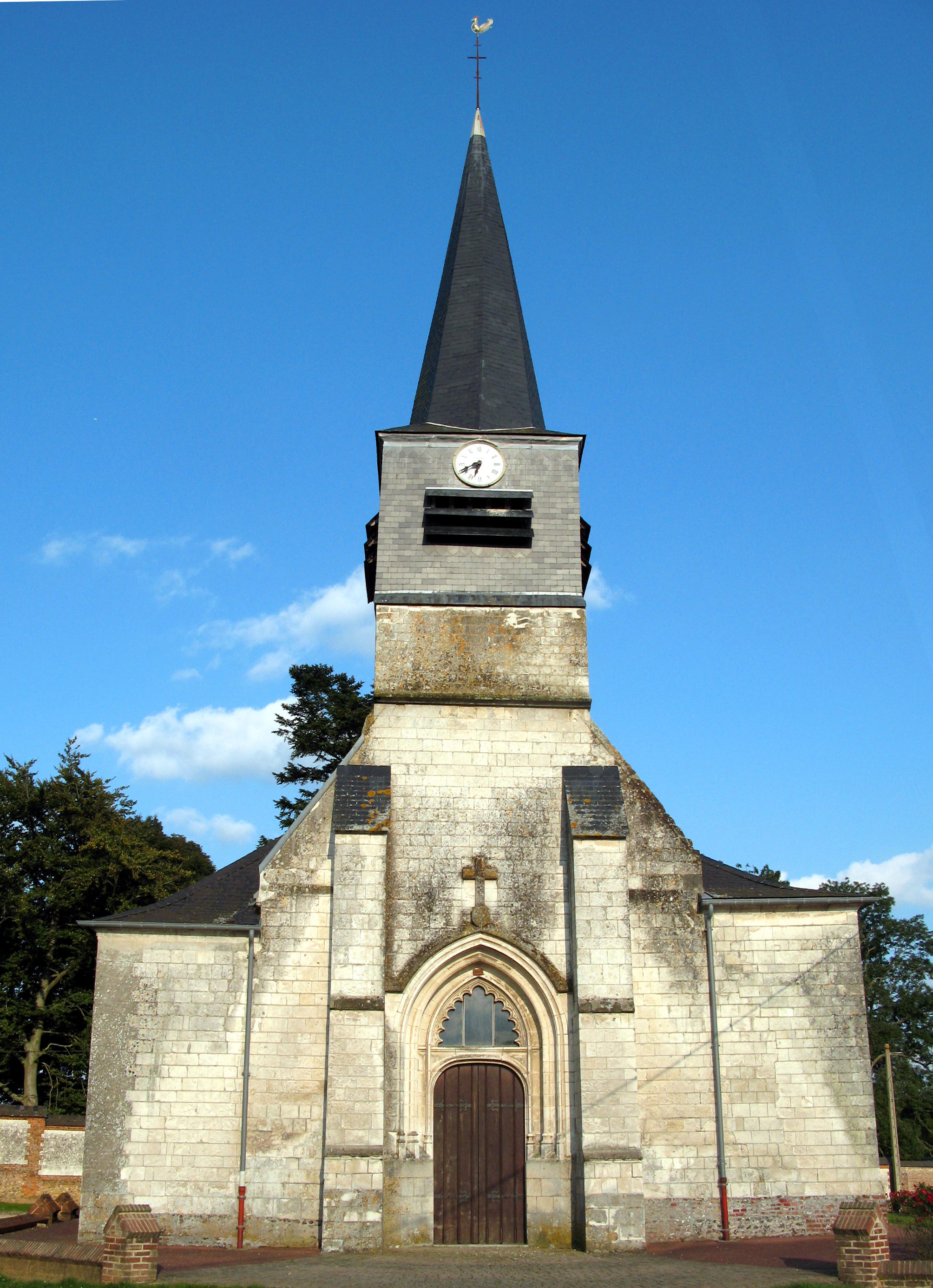
- The church in Mérélessart
- Location of Mérélessart
- Location within France Location within Hauts-de-France
- Coordinates: 49°58′20″N 1°51′00″E
- Country: France
- Region: Hauts-de-France
- Department: Somme
- Arrondissement: Abbeville
- Canton: Gamaches
- Intercommunality: CA Baie de Somme

Government
  - Mayor (2020–2026): Michel Trencart
- Area^{1}: 3.74 km^{2} (1.44 sq mi)
- Elevation: 85 m (279 ft)
- Highest elevation: 122 m (400 ft)
- Lowest elevation: 84 m (276 ft)
- Population (2023): 183
  - Density: 48.9/km^{2} (127/sq mi)
- Time zone: UTC+01:00 (CET)
  - Summer (DST): UTC+02:00 (CEST)
- INSEE/Postal code: 80529 /80490
- ^{1} French Land Register data, which excludes lakes, ponds, glaciers > 1 km^{2} (0.386 sq mi or 247 acres) and river estuaries.

Mérélessart is a commune in the Somme department in Hauts-de-France in northern France.

== Geography ==
The commune is situated on the D21 road, some 10 miles (16 km) south of Abbeville.

== Population ==
Historical population
Year	Pop.	±% p.a.
1968	222	—
1975	223	+0.06%
1982	213	−0.65%
1990	191	−1.35%
1999	184	−0.41%
2007	200	+1.05%
2012	200	+0.00%
2017	197	−0.30%
2023	183	−1.22%
Source: INSEE

== Places of interest ==
- Saint-Martin's church. Known for the painting "La Charité de Saint-Martin" (a listed object, restored 2005–2006), it was painted in 1854 by the artist Isidore Patrois.
- The chapel
- The wrought-iron Calvary
- The war memorial

== See also ==
- Communes of the Somme department
