= Doudelainville =

- Commune
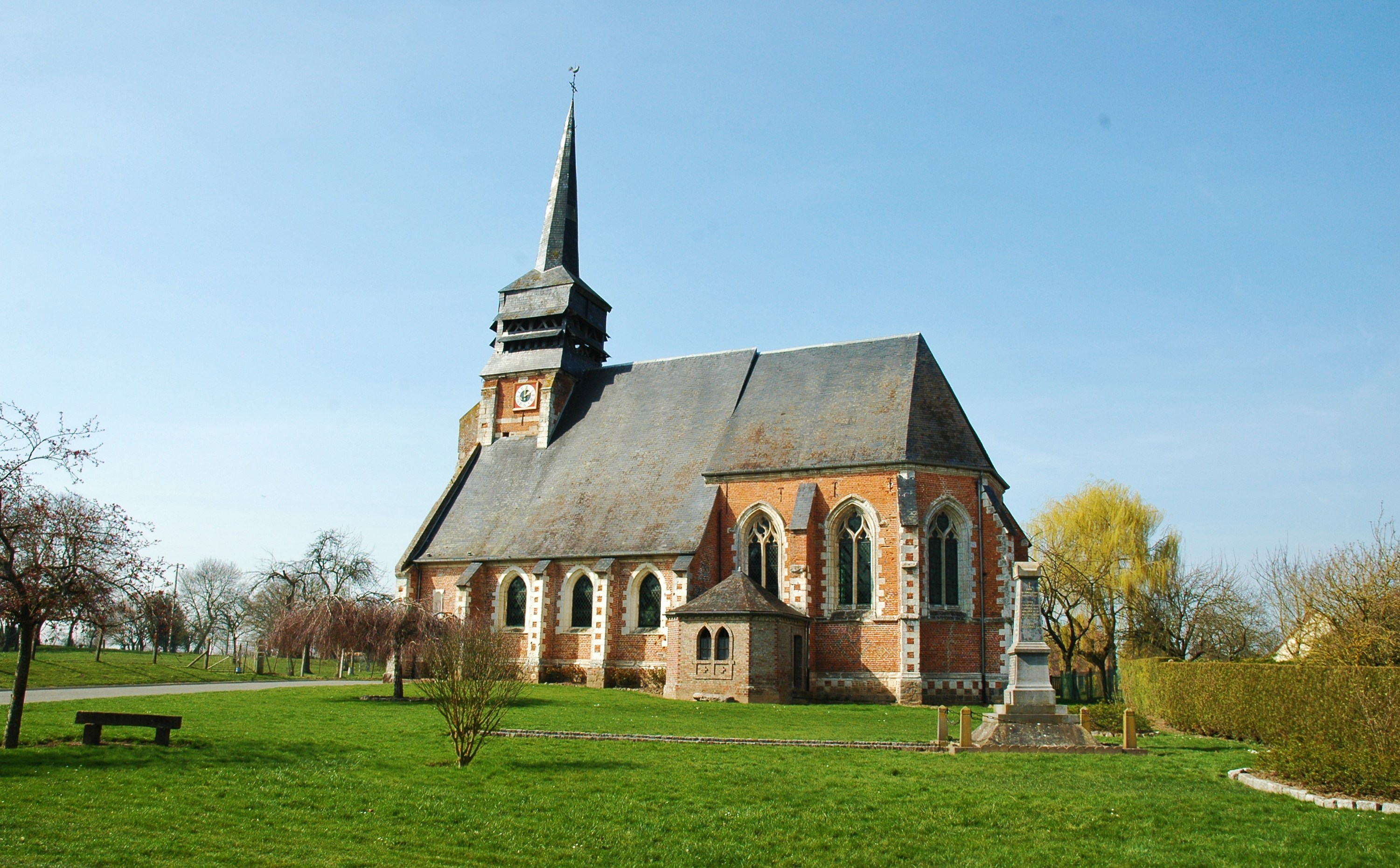
- The church in Doudelainville

- Coat of arms
- Location of Doudelainville
- Location within France Location within Hauts-de-France
- Coordinates: 50°00′09″N 1°46′16″E
- Country: France
- Region: Hauts-de-France
- Department: Somme
- Arrondissement: Abbeville
- Canton: Gamaches
- Intercommunality: CA Baie de Somme

Government
  - Mayor (2020–2026): Rémy Boutroy
- Area^{1}: 4.99 km^{2} (1.93 sq mi)
- Elevation: 100 m (330 ft)
- Highest elevation: 121 m (397 ft)
- Lowest elevation: 69 m (226 ft)
- Population (2023): 363
  - Density: 72.7/km^{2} (188/sq mi)
- Time zone: UTC+01:00 (CET)
  - Summer (DST): UTC+02:00 (CEST)
- INSEE/Postal code: 80251 /80140
- ^{1} French Land Register data, which excludes lakes, ponds, glaciers > 1 km^{2} (0.386 sq mi or 247 acres) and river estuaries.

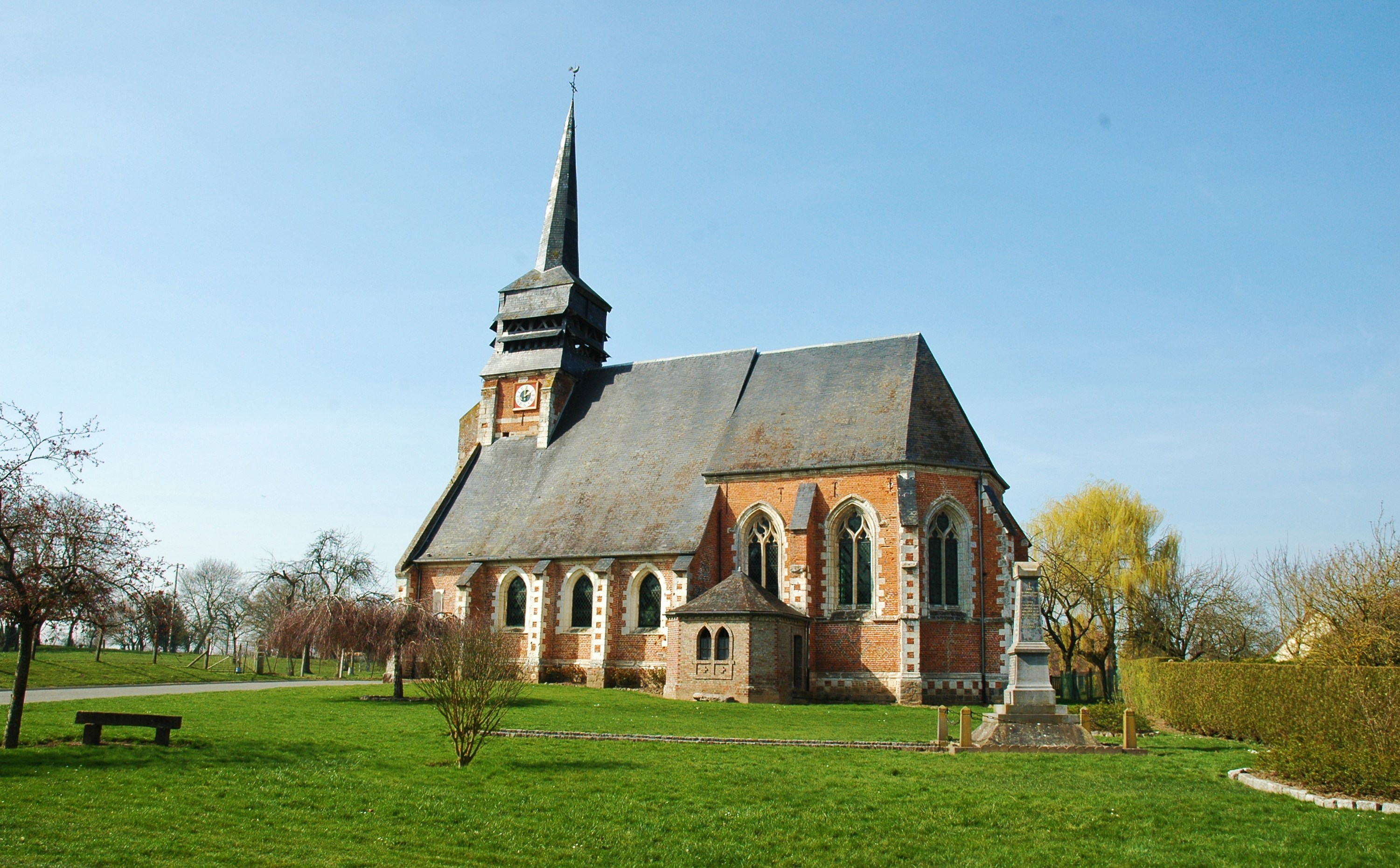

Doudelainville (French pronunciation: [dudlɛ̃vil]; Picard: Dodlinville) is a commune in the Somme department in Hauts-de-France in northern France.

== Geography ==
Doudelainville is situated in the north of the department on the D25 road, about 10 miles (16 km) south of Abbeville.

== Population ==
Historical population
Year	Pop.	±% p.a.
1968	287	—
1975	234	−2.87%
1982	213	−1.33%
1990	188	−1.55%
1999	194	+0.35%
2007	245	+2.96%
2012	332	+6.27%
2017	339	+0.42%
2023	363	+1.15%
Source: INSEE

== See also ==
- Communes of the Somme department
