= Sorel-en-Vimeu =

- Commune
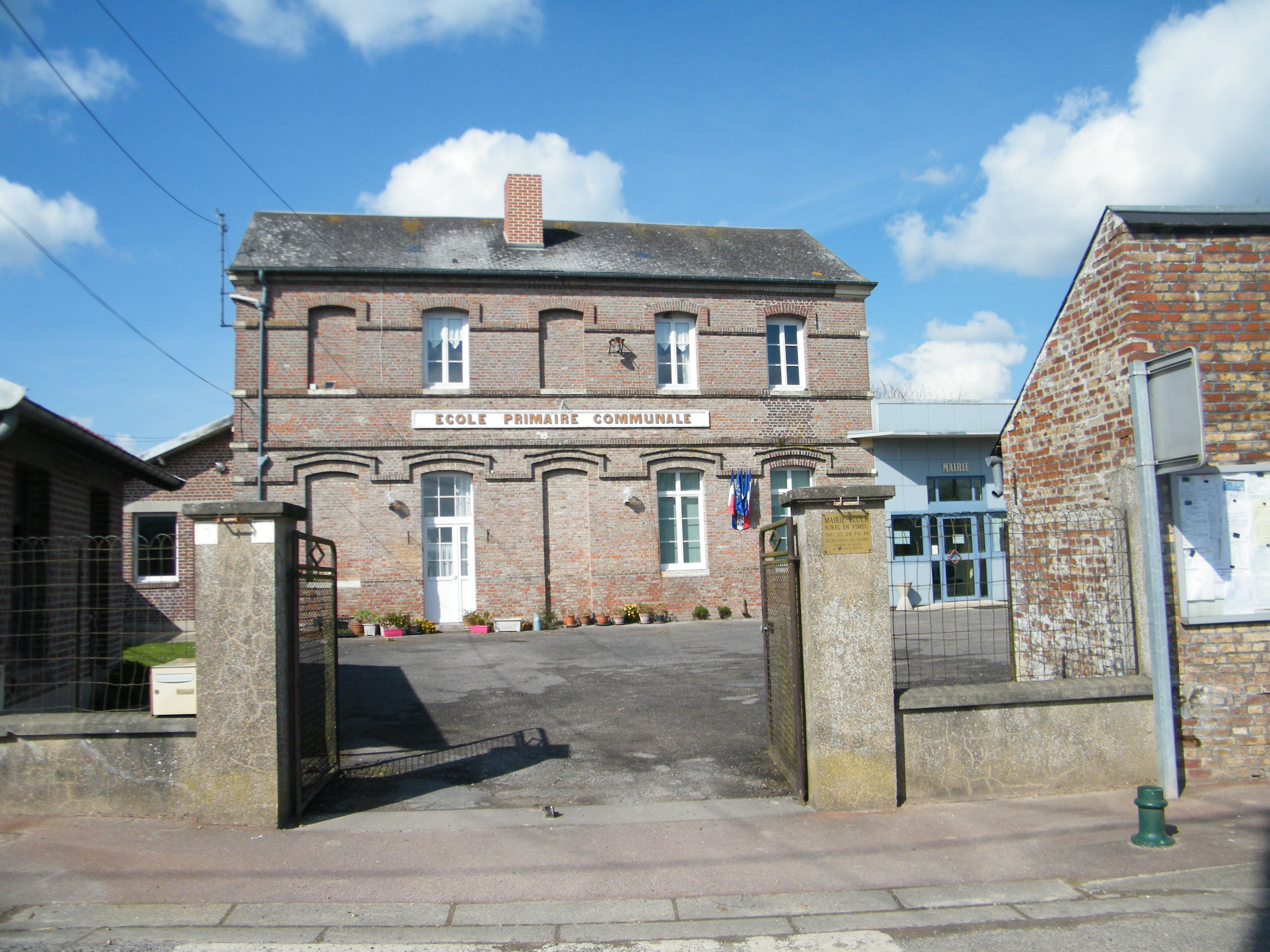
- The town hall and school in Sorel-en-Vimeu

- Coat of arms
- Location of Sorel-en-Vimeu
- Location within France Location within Hauts-de-France
- Coordinates: 50°00′38″N 1°54′29″E
- Country: France
- Region: Hauts-de-France
- Department: Somme
- Arrondissement: Abbeville
- Canton: Gamaches
- Intercommunality: CA Baie de Somme

Government
  - Mayor (2020–2026): Roland Colinet
- Area^{1}: 4.09 km^{2} (1.58 sq mi)
- Elevation: 103 m (338 ft)
- Highest elevation: 117 m (384 ft)
- Lowest elevation: 35 m (115 ft)
- Population (2023): 235
  - Density: 57.5/km^{2} (149/sq mi)
- Time zone: UTC+01:00 (CET)
  - Summer (DST): UTC+02:00 (CEST)
- INSEE/Postal code: 80736 /80490
- ^{1} French Land Register data, which excludes lakes, ponds, glaciers > 1 km^{2} (0.386 sq mi or 247 acres) and river estuaries.

Sorel-en-Vimeu (French pronunciation: [sɔʁɛl ɑ̃ vimø]) is a commune in Somme, Hauts-de-France, France.

== Geography ==
The commune is situated 7 miles (11 km) southeast of Abbeville, at the D901 and D21 crossroads.

== Population ==
Historical population
Year	Pop.	±% p.a.
1968	153	—
1975	175	+1.94%
1982	180	+0.40%
1990	197	+1.13%
1999	188	−0.52%
2007	202	+0.90%
2012	239	+3.42%
2017	213	−2.28%
2023	235	+1.65%
Source: INSEE

== See also ==
- Communes of the Somme department
