= Hallencourt =

- Commune
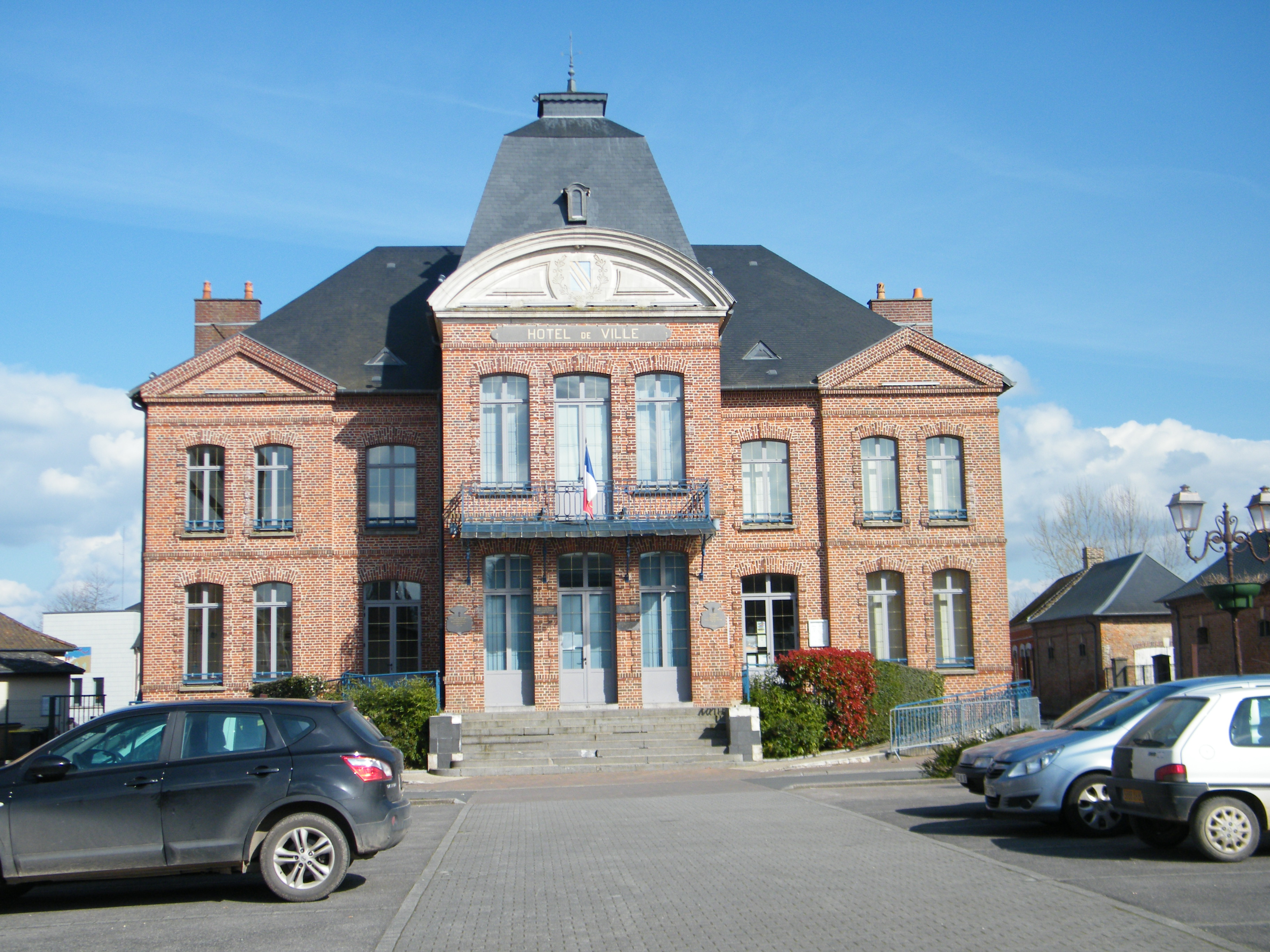
- The town hall in Hallencourt

- Coat of arms
- Location of Hallencourt
- Location within France Location within Hauts-de-France
- Coordinates: 49°59′32″N 1°52′41″E
- Country: France
- Region: Hauts-de-France
- Department: Somme
- Arrondissement: Abbeville
- Canton: Gamaches
- Intercommunality: CA Baie de Somme

Government
  - Mayor (2020–2026): Frédéric Delohen
- Area^{1}: 20.55 km^{2} (7.93 sq mi)
- Elevation: 80 m (260 ft)
- Highest elevation: 121 m (397 ft)
- Lowest elevation: 35 m (115 ft)
- Population (2023): 1,351
  - Density: 65.74/km^{2} (170.3/sq mi)
- Time zone: UTC+01:00 (CET)
  - Summer (DST): UTC+02:00 (CEST)
- INSEE/Postal code: 80406 /80490
- ^{1} French Land Register data, which excludes lakes, ponds, glaciers > 1 km^{2} (0.386 sq mi or 247 acres) and river estuaries.

Hallencourt (French pronunciation: [alɑ̃kuʁ]) is a commune in the Somme department in Hauts-de-France in northern France.

== Geography ==
Hallencourt is situated at the junction of the D21, D53 and D173 roads, some 10 miles (16 km) south of Abbeville. The commune comprises the two villages of Hallencourt and Hocquincourt.

== Population ==
Historical population
| Year | Pop. | ±% p.a. |
|---|---|---|
| 1968 | 1,367 | — |
| 1975 | 1,370 | +0.03% |
| 1982 | 1,407 | +0.38% |
| 1990 | 1,374 | −0.30% |
| 1999 | 1,348 | −0.21% |
| 2007 | 1,387 | +0.36% |
| 2012 | 1,388 | +0.01% |
| 2017 | 1,325 | −0.92% |
| 2023 | 1,351 | +0.32% |
Source: INSEE

== Places of interest ==
- The war memorial
- The Château de Beauvoir at Hocquincourt (now a private hotel)

== Personalities ==
- Roman Opałka, French artist of Polish ancestry, was born in Hocquincourt in 1931.
- Édouard Louis, French writer, is from Hallencourt. He wrote his debut autobiographical novel En finir avec Eddy Bellegueule (2014, translated into English as The End of Eddy) about growing up there.

== See also ==
- Communes of the Somme department
