= Liercourt =

- Commune
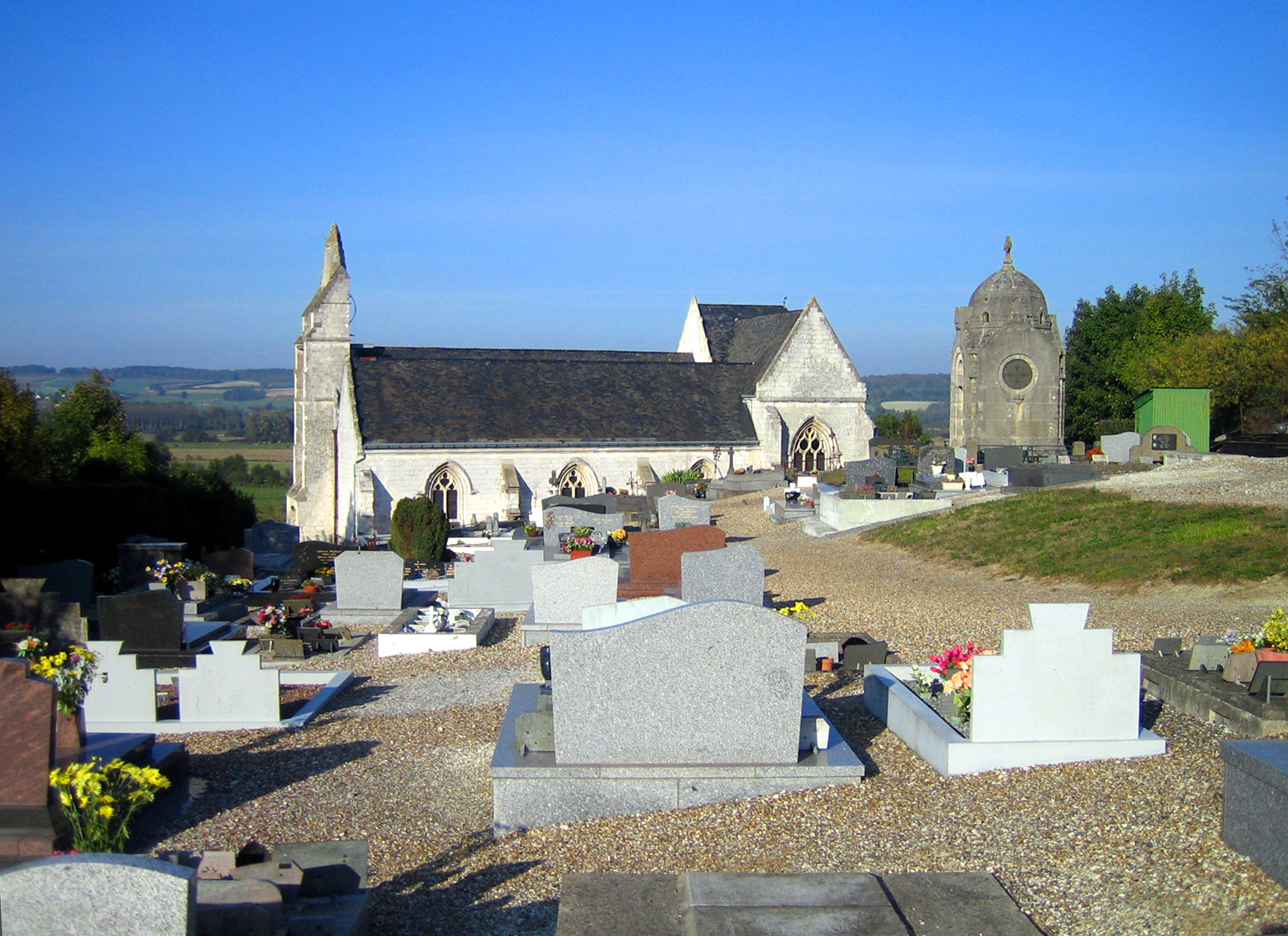
- The church and cemetery in Liercourt

- Coat of arms
- Location of Liercourt
- Location within France Location within Hauts-de-France
- Coordinates: 50°02′24″N 1°54′03″E
- Country: France
- Region: Hauts-de-France
- Department: Somme
- Arrondissement: Abbeville
- Canton: Gamaches
- Intercommunality: CA Baie de Somme

Government
  - Mayor (2020–2026): Philippe Walrave
- Area^{1}: 5.53 km^{2} (2.14 sq mi)
- Elevation: 9 m (30 ft)
- Highest elevation: 104 m (341 ft)
- Lowest elevation: 7 m (23 ft)
- Population (2023): 327
  - Density: 59.1/km^{2} (153/sq mi)
- Time zone: UTC+01:00 (CET)
  - Summer (DST): UTC+02:00 (CEST)
- INSEE/Postal code: 80476 /80580
- ^{1} French Land Register data, which excludes lakes, ponds, glaciers > 1 km^{2} (0.386 sq mi or 247 acres) and river estuaries.

Liercourt (French pronunciation: [ljɛʁkuʁ]; Picard: Lièrcourt) is a commune in the Somme department in Hauts-de-France in northern France.

== Geography ==
Liercourt is situated at the junction of the D3 and D901 roads, in the valley of the Somme River, 7 miles (11 km) southeast of Abbeville.

== Population ==
Historical population
Year	Pop.	±% p.a.
1968	290	—
1975	289	−0.05%
1982	332	+2.00%
1990	289	−1.72%
1999	320	+1.14%
2007	355	+1.31%
2012	343	−0.69%
2017	359	+0.92%
2023	327	−1.54%
Source: INSEE

== See also ==
- Communes of the Somme department
