= Limeux, Somme =

Limeux
- Commune
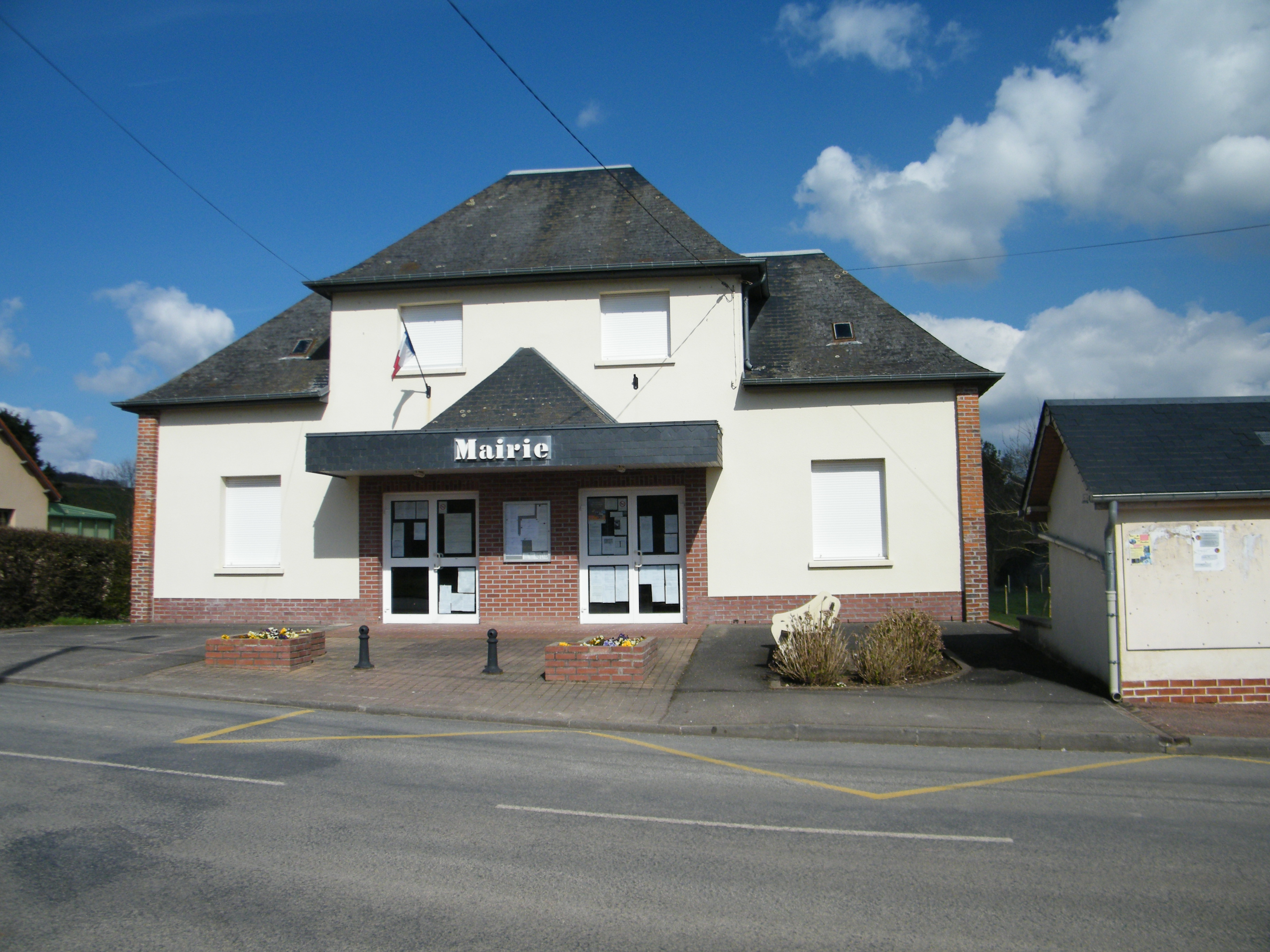
- The town hall in Limeux

- Coat of arms
- Location of Limeux
- Location within France Location within Hauts-de-France
- Coordinates: 50°01′11″N 1°49′02″E
- Country: France
- Region: Hauts-de-France
- Department: Somme
- Arrondissement: Abbeville
- Canton: Gamaches
- Intercommunality: CA Baie de Somme

Government
  - Mayor (2020–2026): Arnaud Bihet
- Area^{1}: 8.62 km^{2} (3.33 sq mi)
- Elevation: 22 m (72 ft)
- Highest elevation: 112 m (367 ft)
- Lowest elevation: 32 m (105 ft)
- Population (2023): 142
  - Density: 16.5/km^{2} (42.7/sq mi)
- Time zone: UTC+01:00 (CET)
  - Summer (DST): UTC+02:00 (CEST)
- INSEE/Postal code: 80482 /80490
- ^{1} French Land Register data, which excludes lakes, ponds, glaciers > 1 km^{2} (0.386 sq mi or 247 acres) and river estuaries.

Limieux (French pronunciation: [limø]) is a commune in the Somme department in Hauts-de-France in northern France.

== See also ==
- Communes of the Somme department
