= Fontaine-sur-Somme =

- Commune
- A general view of Fontaine-sur-Somme

- Coat of arms
- Location of Fontaine-sur-Somme
- Location within France Location within Hauts-de-France
- Coordinates: 50°01′50″N 1°56′23″E
- Country: France
- Region: Hauts-de-France
- Department: Somme
- Arrondissement: Abbeville
- Canton: Gamaches
- Intercommunality: CA Baie de Somme

Government
  - Mayor (2021–2026): Stéphane Deloison
- Area^{1}: 15.18 km^{2} (5.86 sq mi)
- Elevation: 11 m (36 ft)
- Highest elevation: 102 m (335 ft)
- Lowest elevation: 7 m (23 ft)
- Population (2023): 502
  - Density: 33.1/km^{2} (85.7/sq mi)
- Time zone: UTC+01:00 (CET)
  - Summer (DST): UTC+02:00 (CEST)
- INSEE/Postal code: 80328 /80510
- ^{1} French Land Register data, which excludes lakes, ponds, glaciers > 1 km^{2} (0.386 sq mi or 247 acres) and river estuaries.

Fontaine-sur-Somme (French pronunciation: [fɔ̃tɛn syʁ sɔm], literally Fontaine on Somme; Picard: Fontainne-su-Sonme) is a commune in the Somme department in Hauts-de-France in northern France.

== Geography ==
The commune is situated on the D3 road, some 10 miles (16 km) southeast of Abbeville on the left bank of the river Somme.

== Main sights ==
- The church at Fontaine-sur-Somme
- The church at Vieulaines
- Stone cross
- The lakes
- War memorial

== See also ==
- Communes of the Somme department
