= Frucourt =

- Commune
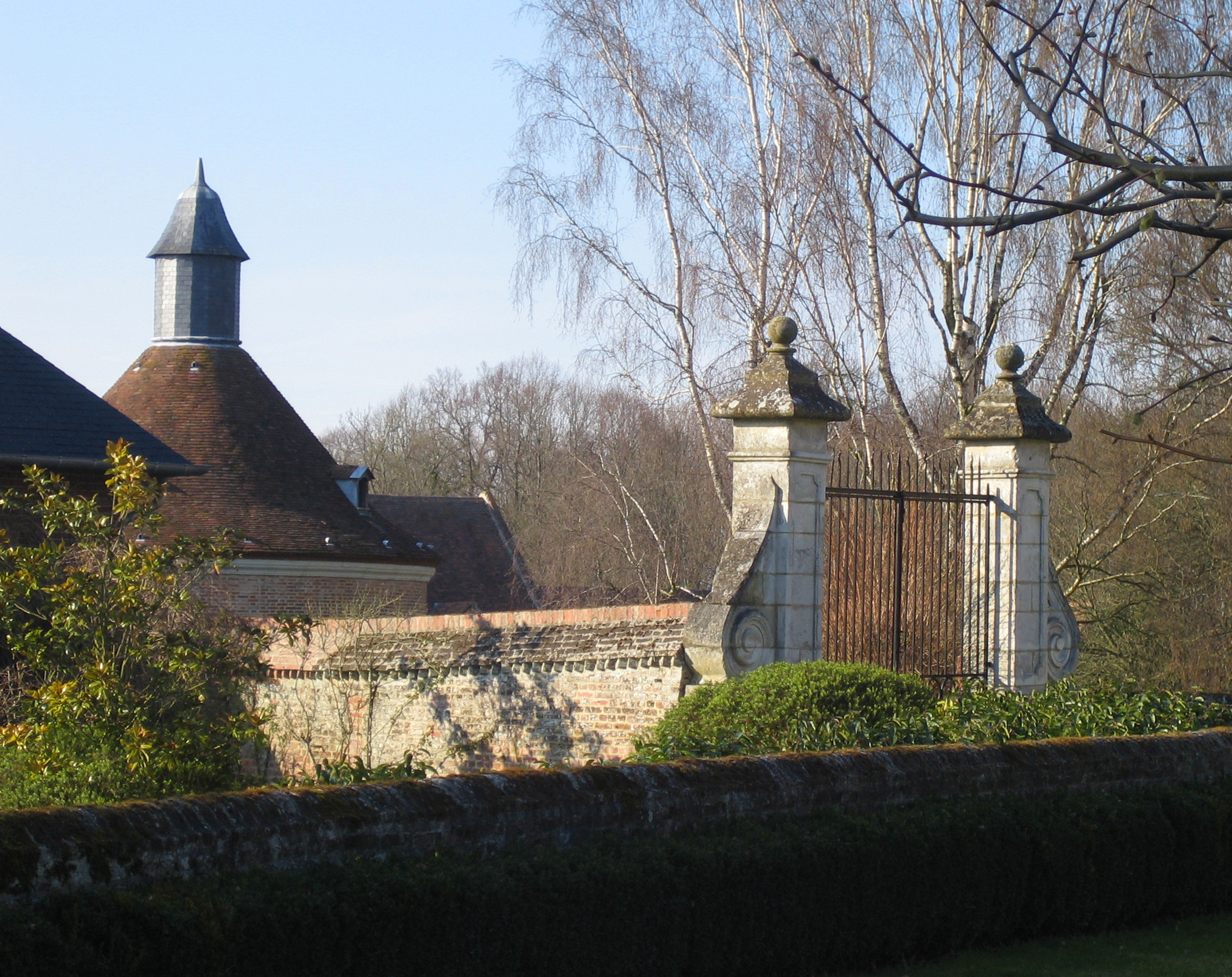
- Dovecote
- Location of Frucourt
- Location within France Location within Hauts-de-France
- Coordinates: 49°59′47″N 1°48′36″E
- Country: France
- Region: Hauts-de-France
- Department: Somme
- Arrondissement: Abbeville
- Canton: Gamaches
- Intercommunality: CA Baie de Somme

Government
  - Mayor (2020–2026): Gilbert Duchemin
- Area^{1}: 5.27 km^{2} (2.03 sq mi)
- Elevation: 100 m (330 ft)
- Highest elevation: 114 m (374 ft)
- Lowest elevation: 48 m (157 ft)
- Population (2023): 121
  - Density: 23.0/km^{2} (59.5/sq mi)
- Time zone: UTC+01:00 (CET)
  - Summer (DST): UTC+02:00 (CEST)
- INSEE/Postal code: 80372 /80490
- ^{1} French Land Register data, which excludes lakes, ponds, glaciers > 1 km^{2} (0.386 sq mi or 247 acres) and river estuaries.

Frucourt (French pronunciation: [fʁyˈkuʁ]) is a commune in the Somme department in Hauts-de-France in northern France.

== Geography ==
Frucourt is situated on the D93 road, some 10 miles (16 km) south of Abbeville.

== Population ==
Historical population
Year	Pop.	±% p.a.
1968	155	—
1975	165	+0.90%
1982	162	−0.26%
1990	142	−1.63%
1999	121	−1.76%
2007	134	+1.28%
2012	136	+0.30%
2017	132	−0.60%
2023	121	−1.44%
Source: INSEE

== Places of interest ==
- The windmill, built in brick in 1641. The walls are 6 ft (1,80m) thick at the base. It bears the (defaced) armorial of the seigneurs of the château of Frucourt, the Monthomer family. In June 2004, it was completely renovated and won a heritage prize " Les Rubans du Patrimoine".
- The château
- The church
- The war memorial

== See also ==
- Communes of the Somme department
