= Gamaches =

Municipality in Hauts-de-France, France

- Commune
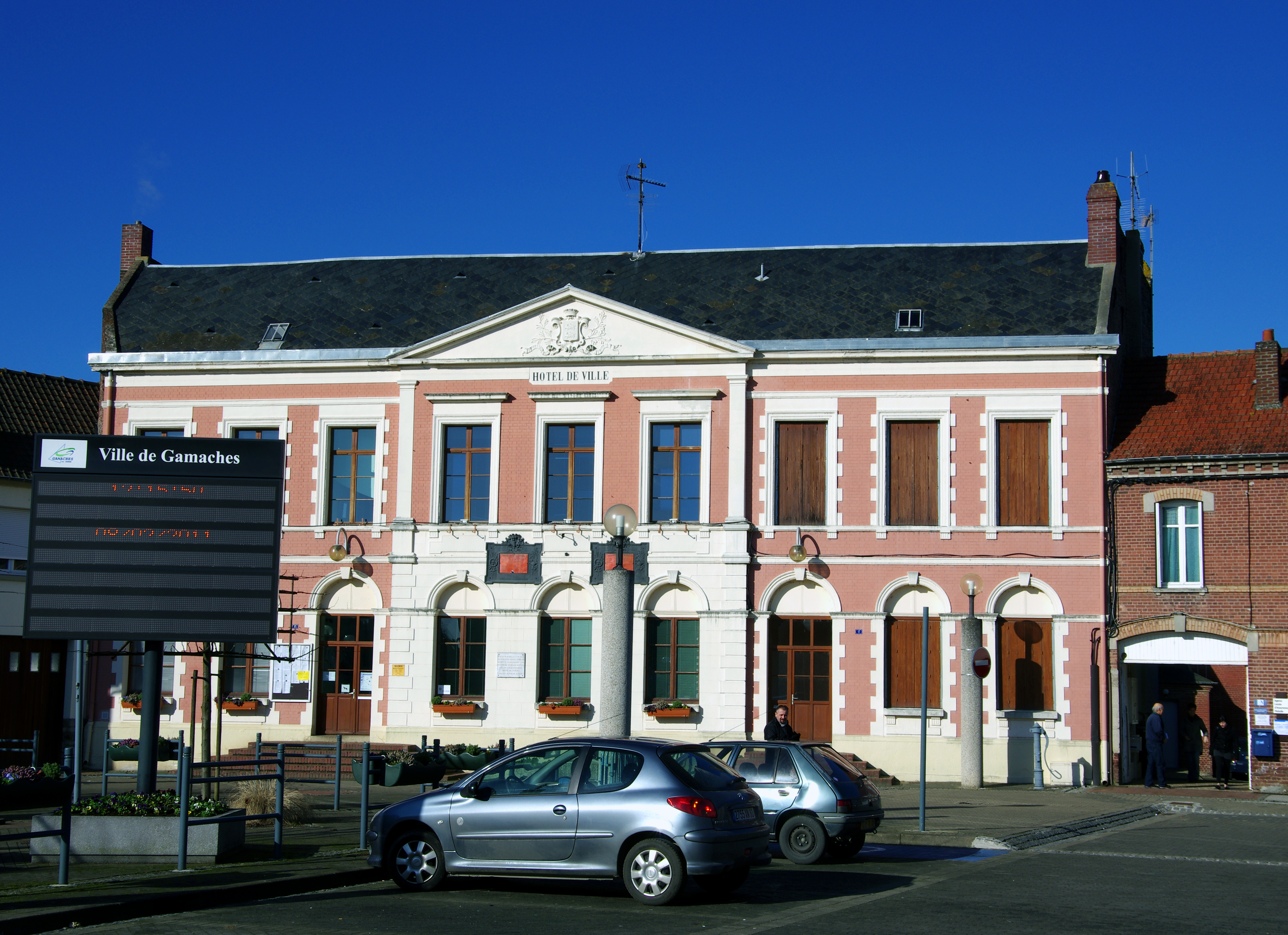
- The town hall in Gamaches

- Coat of arms
- Location of Gamaches
- Location within France Location within Hauts-de-France
- Coordinates: 49°59′15″N 1°33′29″E
- Country: France
- Region: Hauts-de-France
- Department: Somme
- Arrondissement: Abbeville
- Canton: Gamaches
- Intercommunality: CC Villes Sœurs

Government
  - Mayor (2020–2026): Jean-Paul Mongne
- Area^{1}: 9.92 km^{2} (3.83 sq mi)
- Elevation: 32 m (105 ft)
- Highest elevation: 126 m (413 ft)
- Lowest elevation: 19 m (62 ft)
- Population (2023): 2,397
  - Density: 242/km^{2} (626/sq mi)
- Time zone: UTC+01:00 (CET)
  - Summer (DST): UTC+02:00 (CEST)
- INSEE/Postal code: 80373 /80220
- ^{1} French Land Register data, which excludes lakes, ponds, glaciers > 1 km^{2} (0.386 sq mi or 247 acres) and river estuaries.

Gamaches (French pronunciation: [ɡamaʃ]) is a commune in the Somme department in Hauts-de-France in northern France.

== Geography ==
Gamaches is situated on the D1015, on the banks of the river Bresle, the border with Seine-Maritime, some 18 miles (29 km) southwest of Abbeville.
Huge lakes to the west of the town are a paradise for naturalists, anglers and water sports enthusiasts.

== History ==
- 1471 Louis XI and the Burgundians wage war in and around the town. A year or so later, Charles the Bold ravaged Picardy in the continuing battle with Burgundy. The plague decimated not only the troops but also the local populace.
- Glass bottles have been manufactured in Gamaches since 1922.

== Population ==
Historical population
Year	Pop.	±% p.a.
1968	3,216	—
1975	3,467	+1.08%
1982	3,270	−0.83%
1990	3,099	−0.67%
1999	2,949	−0.55%
2007	2,847	−0.44%
2012	2,730	−0.84%
2017	2,548	−1.37%
2023	2,397	−1.01%
Source: INSEE

== Places of interest ==
- The war memorial
- The thirteenth-century church of Saint-Pierre and Saint-Paul, with its flamboyant gothic tower, is the result of successive architectural influences.
- The old railway line, opened in 1872 and closed in 1993

- The lakes

== See also ==
- Communes of the Somme department
