= Citerne =

- Commune
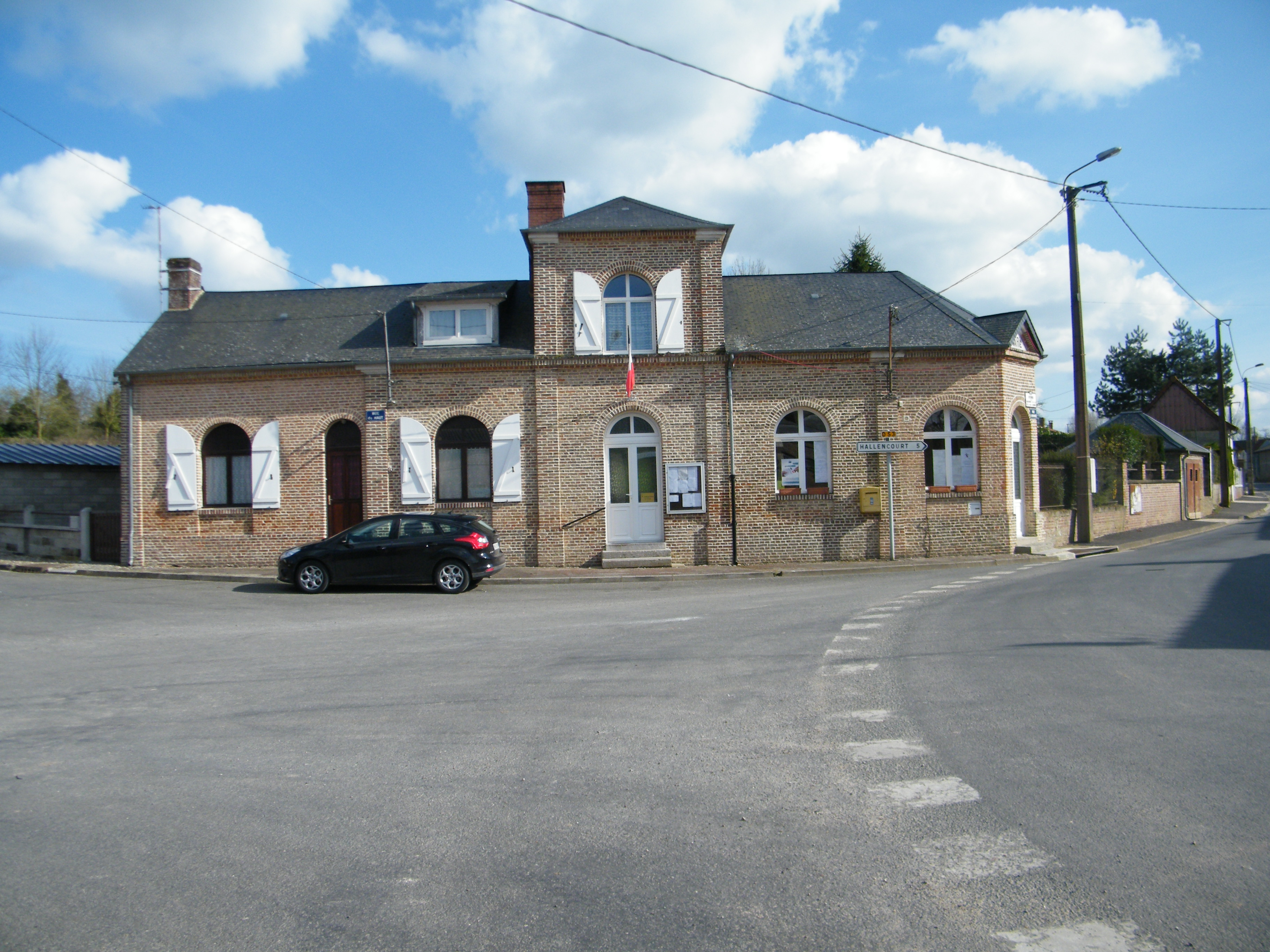
- The town hall in Citerne
- Location of Citerne
- Location within France Location within Hauts-de-France
- Coordinates: 49°58′59″N 1°49′27″E
- Country: France
- Region: Hauts-de-France
- Department: Somme
- Arrondissement: Abbeville
- Canton: Gamaches
- Intercommunality: CA Baie de Somme

Government
  - Mayor (2020–2026): Luc Chatenay
- Area^{1}: 6.4 km^{2} (2.5 sq mi)
- Elevation: 108 m (354 ft)
- Highest elevation: 123 m (404 ft)
- Lowest elevation: 83 m (272 ft)
- Population (2023): 240
  - Density: 38/km^{2} (97/sq mi)
- Time zone: UTC+01:00 (CET)
  - Summer (DST): UTC+02:00 (CEST)
- INSEE/Postal code: 80196 /80490
- ^{1} French Land Register data, which excludes lakes, ponds, glaciers > 1 km^{2} (0.386 sq mi or 247 acres) and river estuaries.

Citerne (French pronunciation: [sitɛʁn]; Picard: Chitèrne) is a commune in the Somme department in Hauts-de-France in northern France.

== Geography ==
Citerne is situated on the D53, in the west of the département, some 12 miles (19 km) south of Abbeville.

== Population ==
Historical population
Year	Pop.	±% p.a.
1968	313	—
1975	301	−0.56%
1982	287	−0.68%
1990	279	−0.35%
1999	262	−0.70%
2007	256	−0.29%
2012	273	+1.29%
2017	238	−2.71%
2023	240	+0.14%
Source: INSEE

== Places of interest ==
- War memorial
- Church

== See also ==
- Communes of the Somme department
