= Oisemont =

- Commune
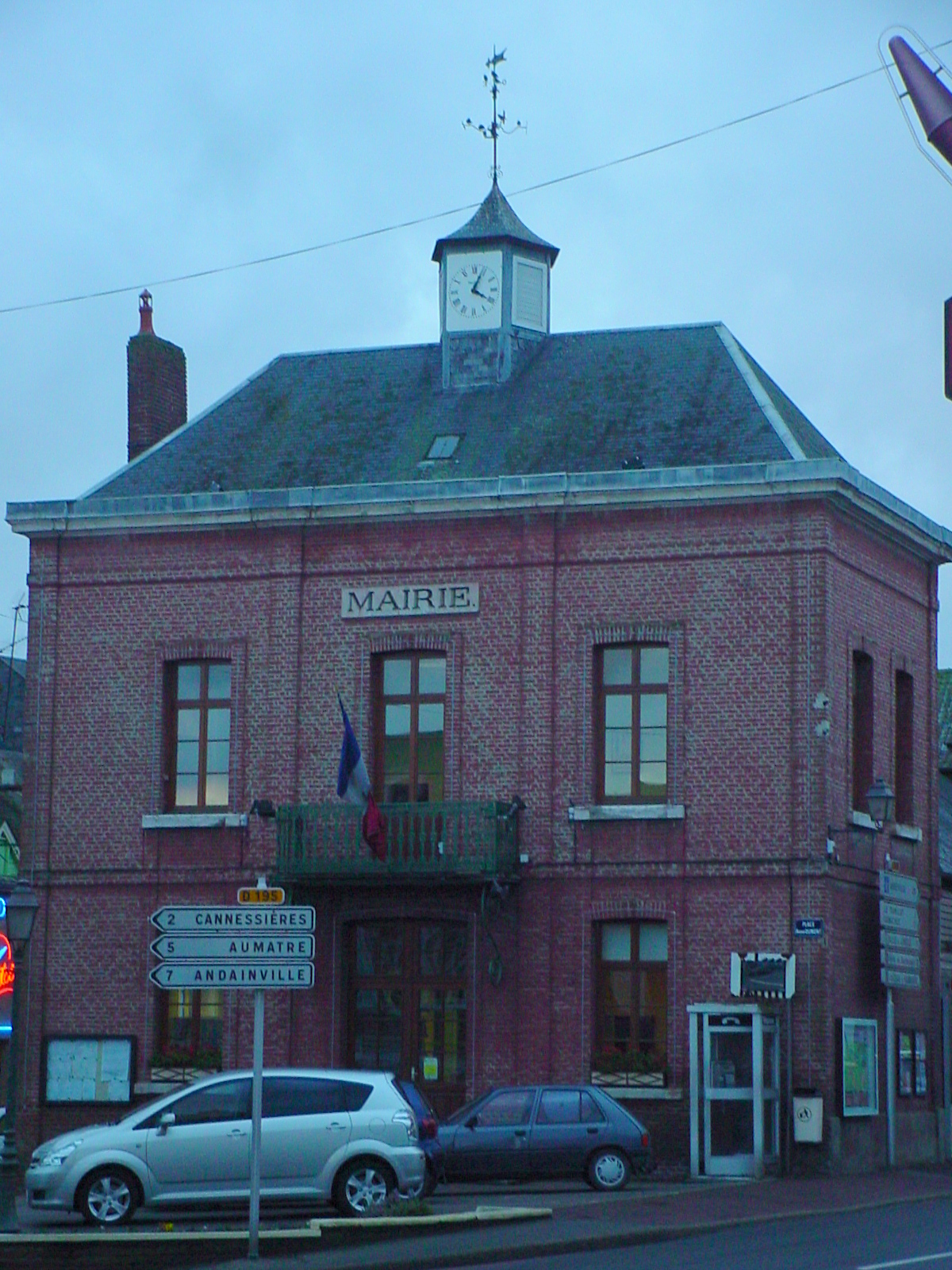
- The town hall in Oisemont

- Coat of arms
- Location of Oisemont
- Location within France Location within Hauts-de-France
- Coordinates: 49°57′22″N 1°46′02″E
- Country: France
- Region: Hauts-de-France
- Department: Somme
- Arrondissement: Amiens
- Canton: Poix-de-Picardie
- Intercommunality: CC Somme Sud-Ouest

Government
  - Mayor (2020–2026): Amaury Caulier
- Area^{1}: 8.04 km^{2} (3.10 sq mi)
- Elevation: 118 m (387 ft)
- Highest elevation: 135 m (443 ft)
- Lowest elevation: 80 m (260 ft)
- Population (2023): 1,127
  - Density: 140/km^{2} (363/sq mi)
- Time zone: UTC+01:00 (CET)
  - Summer (DST): UTC+02:00 (CEST)
- INSEE/Postal code: 80606 /80140
- ^{1} French Land Register data, which excludes lakes, ponds, glaciers > 1 km^{2} (0.386 sq mi or 247 acres) and river estuaries.

Oisemont (French pronunciation: [wazmɔ̃]) is a commune in the Somme department in Hauts-de-France in northern France.

== Geography ==
Oisemont is situated on the junction of the D25, D29 and D936 roads, some 10 south of Abbeville and 25 miles (40 km) west of Amiens.

== Population ==
Historical population

Year	Pop.	±% p.a.
1936	1,061	—
1946	987	−0.72%
1954	1,046	+0.73%
1962	997	−0.60%
1968	1,071	+1.20%
1975	1,196	+1.59%
1982	1,233	+0.44%

Year	Pop.	±% p.a.
1990	1,285	+0.52%
1999	1,244	−0.36%
2007	1,267	+0.23%
2012	1,182	−1.38%
2017	1,171	−0.19%
2023	1,127	−0.64%

Source: EHESS and INSEE

== History ==
- The name has its origins in Celtic religion and mythology, as ‘mont of Ésus. Over the centuries, it has been known as Ossemons, Aussemons and Wessemont. There is evidence pointing to Acheulean origins and Roman occupation.
- By 1275, the town was the seat of the provost of the Vimeu.
- The Templars of Acheux became a part of the bailiwick of Oisemont, setting up a preceptory of the house of Aisseu.
- In 1307, a second headquarters was set up by the Knights Hospitaller. The building still stands today, in the ‘rue de la Commanderie’, as do several other historic buildings
- The castle was destroyed in 1346 by the army of Edward III during the Hundred Years War. It had defensive ramparts to protect the inhabitants in times of attack. It was rebuilt and destroyed again in 1370 by John of Gaunt.
- A Templar hospital was built on the site of the present old-peoples’ home. All that remains is a stone cross.
- The year 1472 saw Charles the Bold set fire to the town, reducing it to ashes.
- During the Wars of Religion of the 16th century, the town was an important Protestant centre. By the 17th century, the Huguenots were hiding in underground passages for protection.

== Places of interest ==
- The mairie (town hall)
- The old windmill. Sitting in the middle of a field, a little way from the town, the brick-built windmill is missing its sails, roofing and windows and is completely abandoned.
- The twelfth-century church of Saint-Martin, with a Romanesque entrance and a 42m tower. Restored in 1808, the nave collapsed in 1953 and it was then demolished. The new church was completed in March 1960
- The war memorials
- The Museum of Local Art, opened in 1976
- The market hall, built in 1853
- The old railway line, which served as freight transport, but also for passengers, was opened in 1872 and closed in 1993
- The ruins of the 17th-century château. An entrance gate and octagonal tower are all that remain.
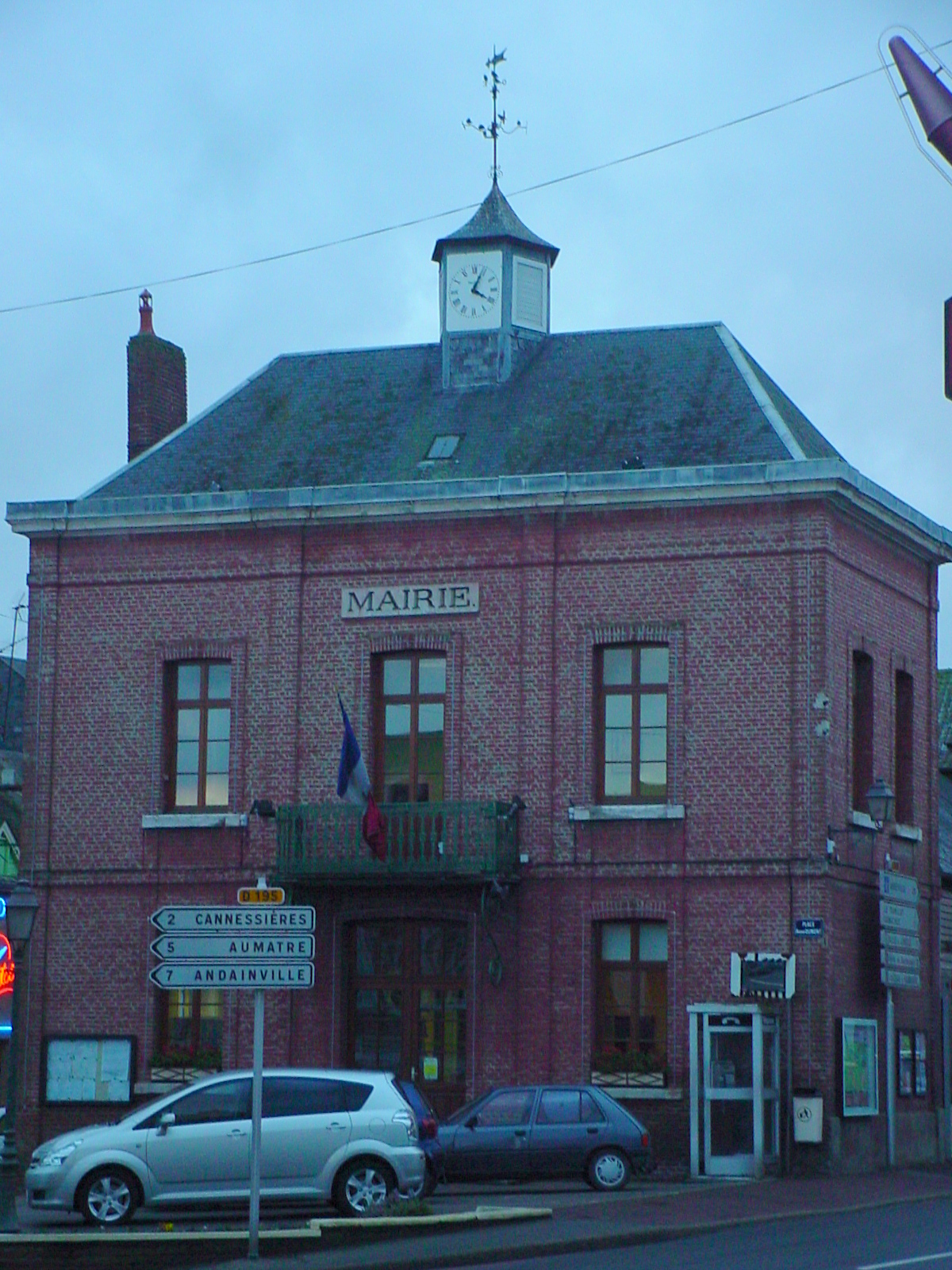
The mairie (town hall)

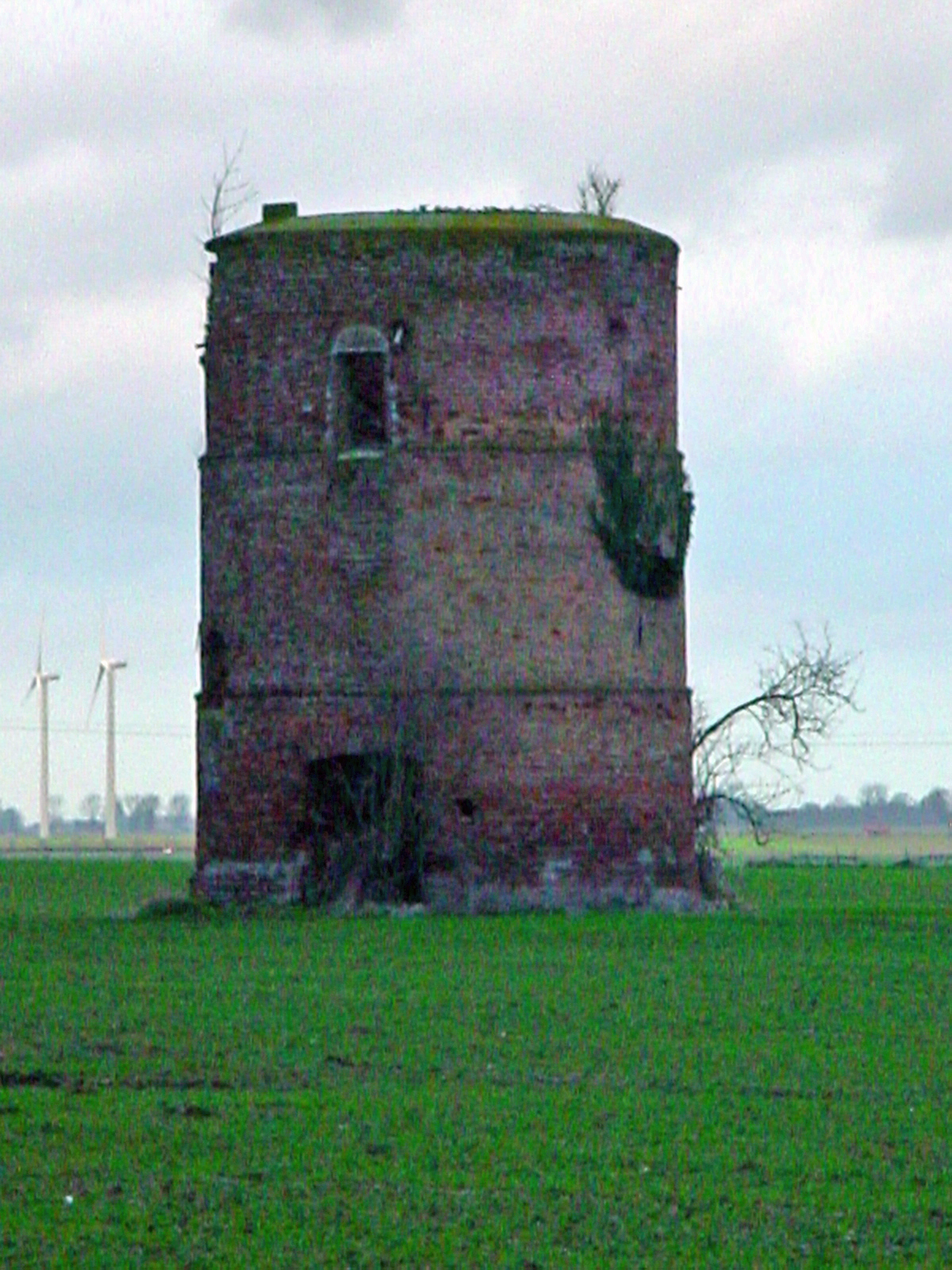
The mill in 2007

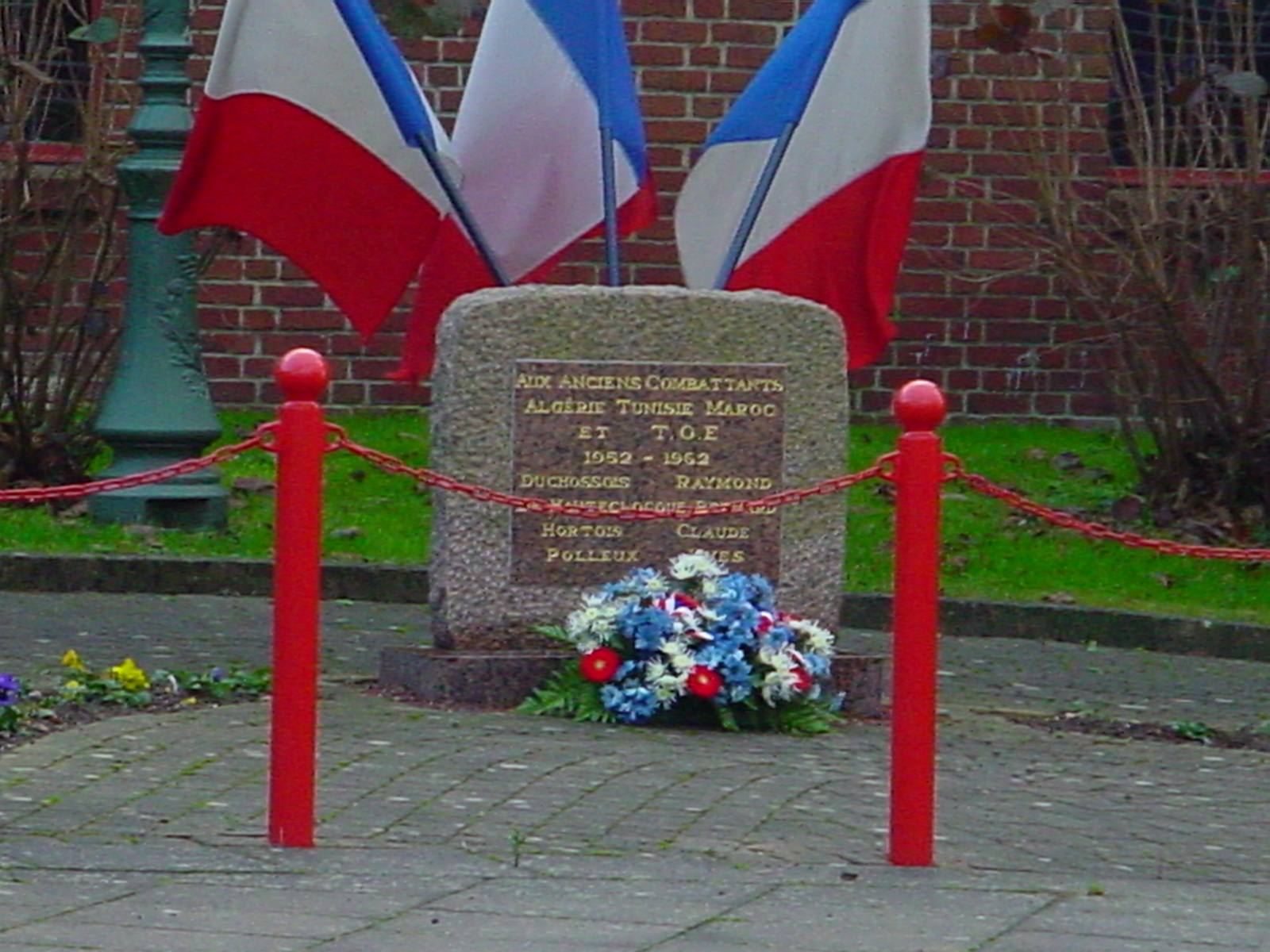
War memorial

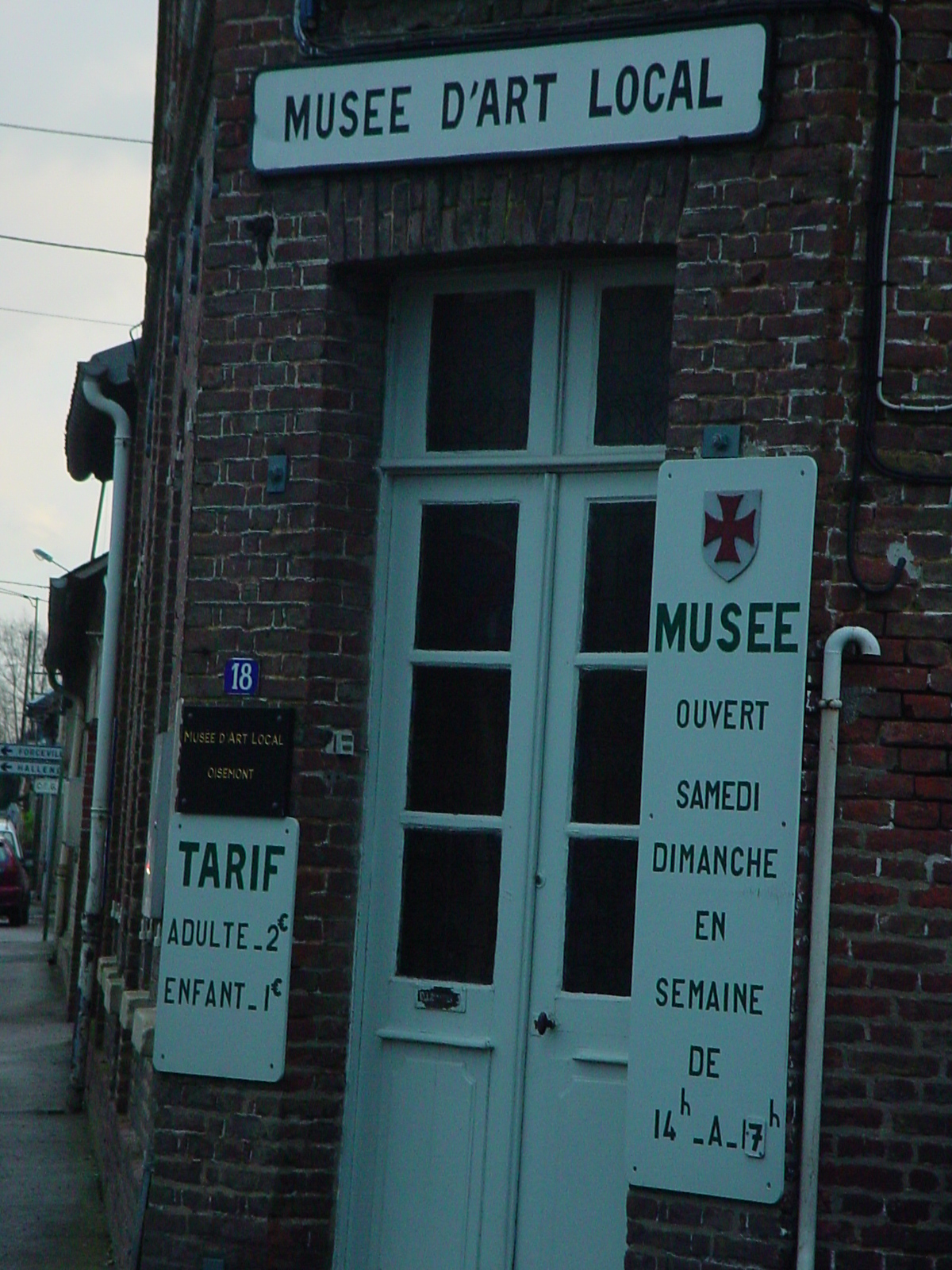
Museum

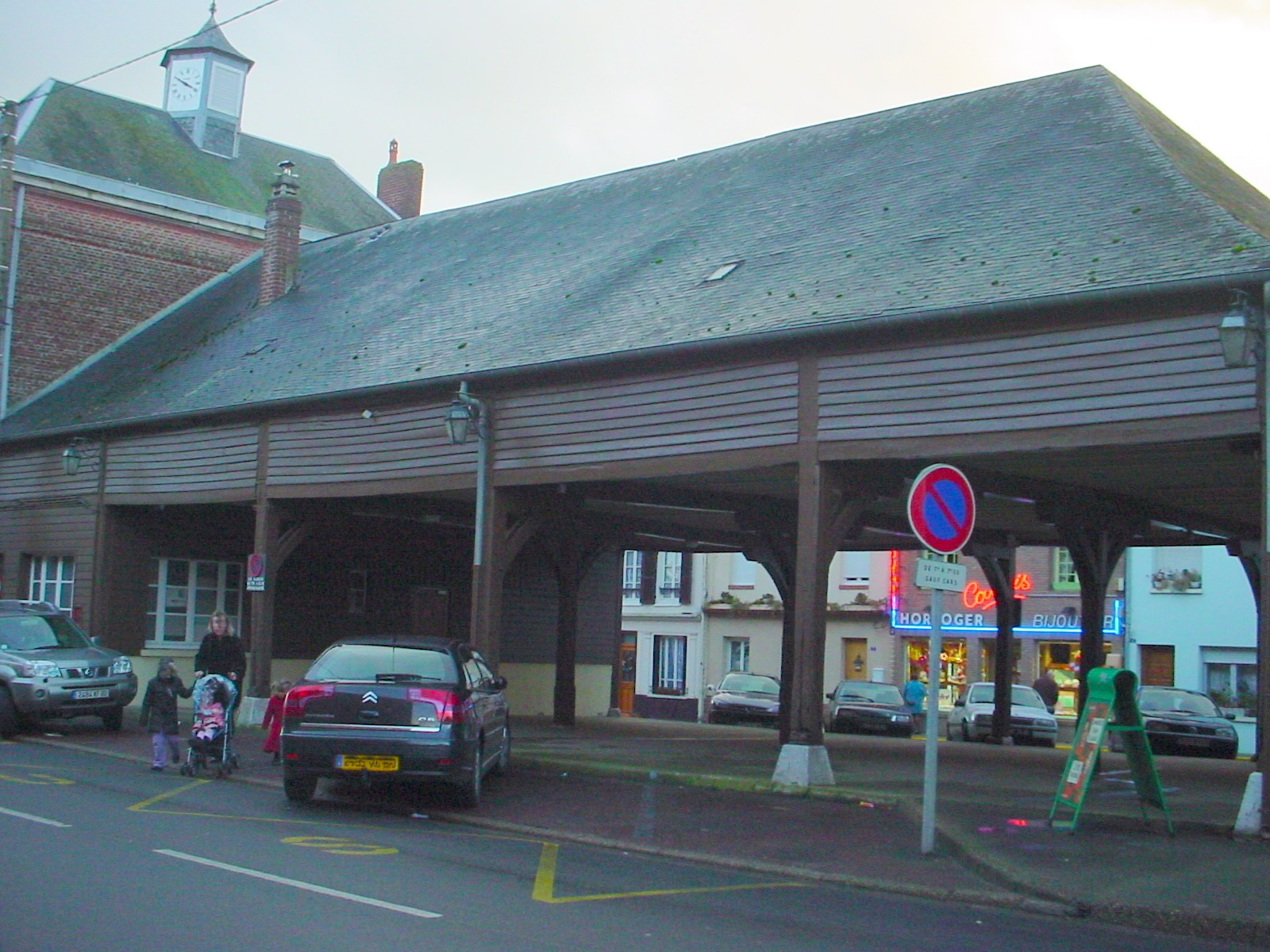
Market hall

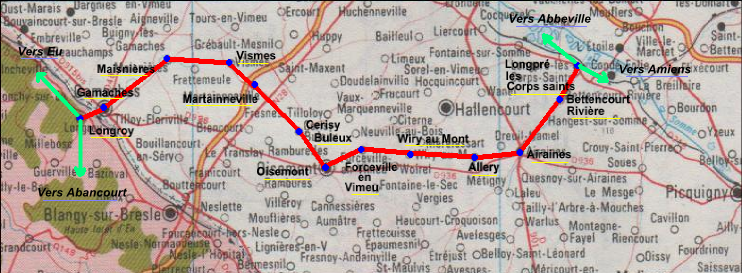
Old railway line

== Personalities ==
- Charles Dumont de Sainte-Croix: 1758-1830, Ornithologist

== See also ==
- Communes of the Somme department
