= Longroy–Gamaches station =

French railway station

Longroy–Gamaches
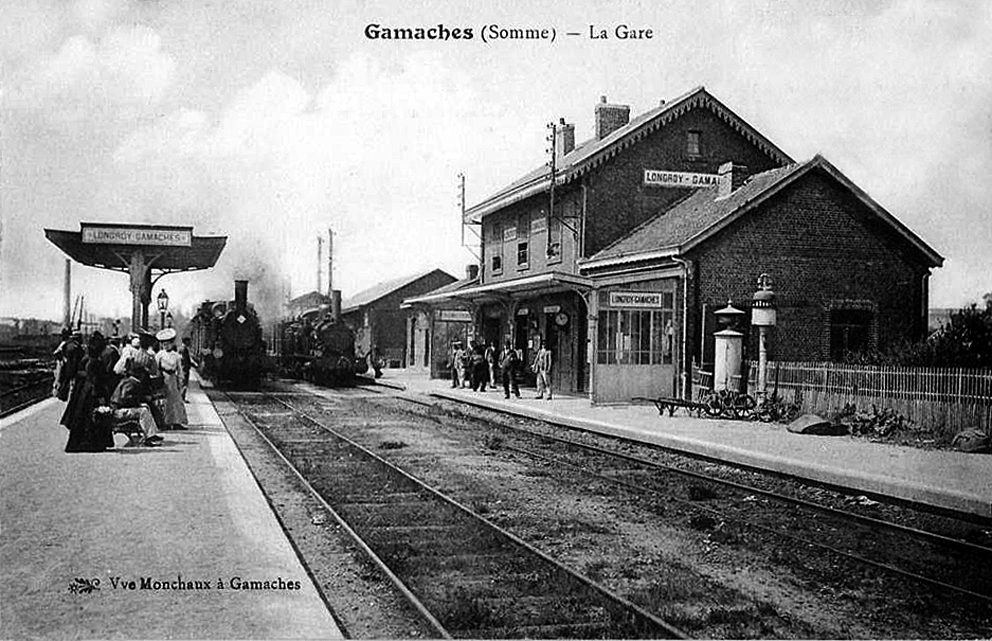
- Gare de Longroy-Gamaches in 1900

General information
- Coordinates: 49°58′55″N 1°33′10″E
- Owner: RFF/SNCF
- Line: Épinay-Villetaneuse–Le Tréport-Mers railway

Other information
- Station code: 87313817

History
- Opened: 1872

Services
Preceding station	TER Hauts-de-France	Following station
Blangy-sur-Bresle towards Beauvais	Proxi P30	Eu towards Le Tréport-Mers
Location

Gare de Longroy-Gamaches (Longroy-Gamaches Station) is a French railway station in the commune of Longroy in the Seine-Maritime department near Gamaches in the Somme department.

The station is served by TER Hauts-de-France trains from Beauvais to Le Tréport-Mers.

== History ==
The Gare de Longroy-Gamaches formerly provided a connection to Longpré-les-Corps-Saints. This single-track line opened on 9 May 1872 and was degraded on 10 November 1993. Between Longpré-les-Corps-Saints and Longroy-Gamaches it served Bettencourt-Rivière, Airaines, Allery, Wiry-au-Mont, Forceville, Oisemont, Cerisy-Buleux, Martainneville–Saint-Maxent, Vismes-au-Val, Maisnières and Gamaches.

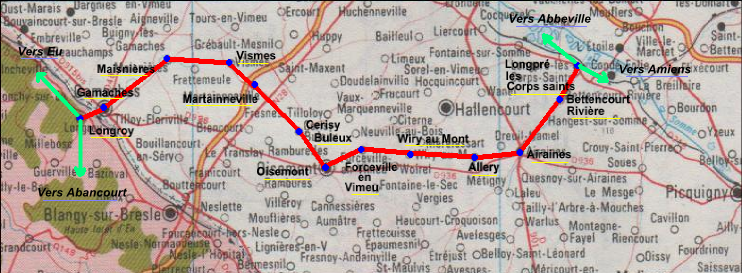

== See also ==
- List of SNCF stations in Normandy
