= Eu station =

French railway station in Eu, France

Eu
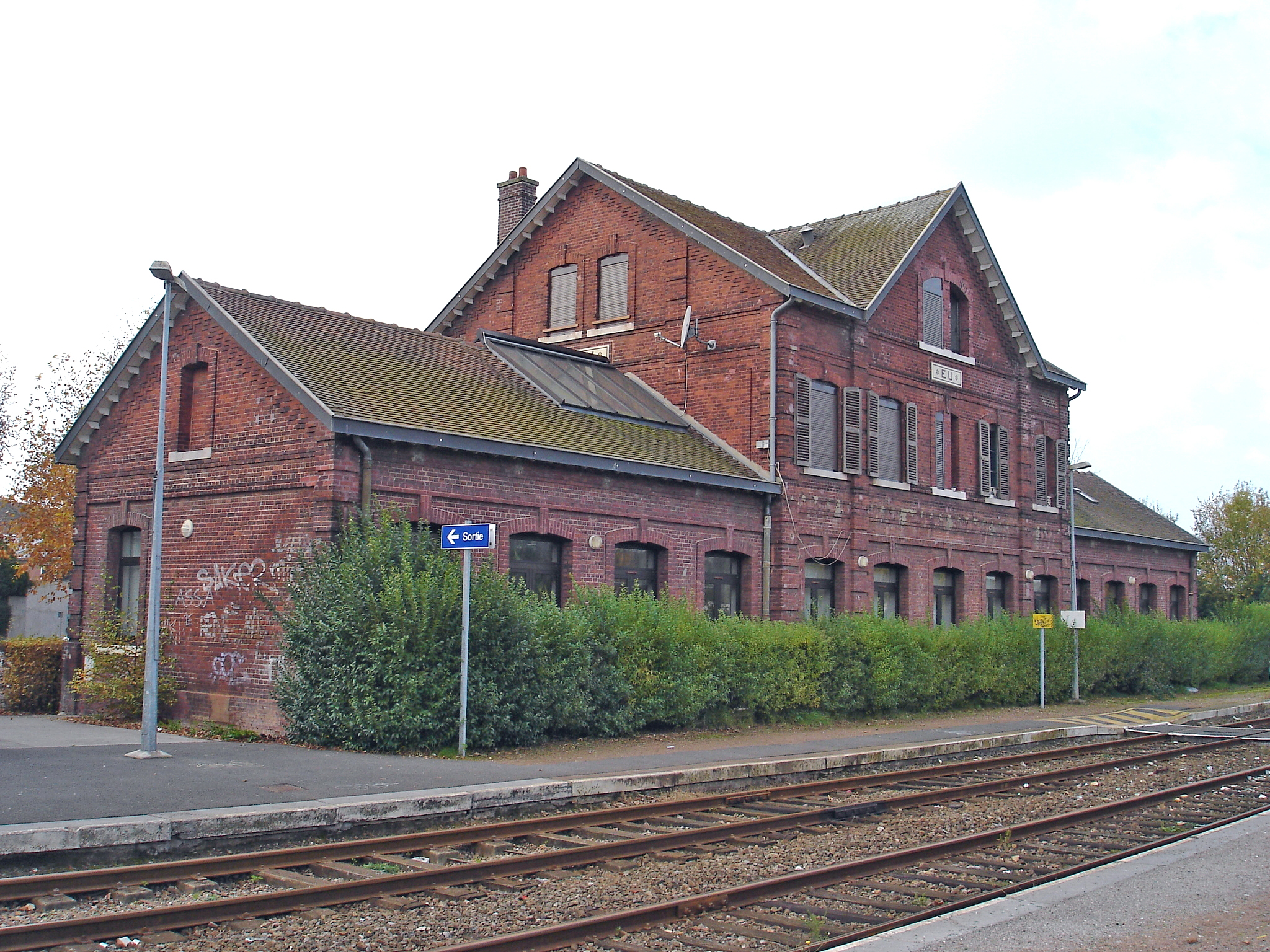

General information
- Location: 76260 Eu, France
- Coordinates: 50°3′15″N 1°25′1″E
- Owner: RFF/SNCF
- Lines: Abbeville–Eu railway, Épinay-Villetaneuse–Le Tréport-Mers railway
- Platforms: 2
- Tracks: 2

Other information
- Station code: 87317537

Services
Preceding station	TER Hauts-de-France	Following station
Longroy–Gamaches towards Beauvais	Proxi P30	Le Tréport–Mers towards Le Tréport-Mers
Location

The Gare d'Eu (Eu station) is a railway station in the commune of Eu in the Seine-Maritime department, France, in Normandy.

It is the main station for Eu; the former Eu-la Mouillette was better located but served by only one rail line.

== History ==
The station was previously called Gare d'Eu-La Chaussée or simply Gare de la Chaussée. It was opened by the Nord company on 11 May 1872 as part of the line between Longroy-Gamaches and Le Tréport-Mers. From 4 December 1888 when the line between Abbeville and Eu was opened, it was a transfer point for passengers travelling towards Dieppe. The line between Eu and Dieppe was closed on 2 October 1938 and has been partly turned into a footpath: le chemin vert du Petit Caux (Petit-Caux greenway).

The station was also the terminus of a tramway which operated from 1902 to 1934 between Eu, Le Tréport and Mers-les-Bains, the tramway d'Eu-Le Tréport-Mers.

The SNCF sold the station to a private individual; today it is an unstaffed stop with only an automatic ticket dispenser. Train services to Abbeville were discontinued in 2018.

== Rail service ==
The Gare d'Eu is at the junction of the Abbeville–Eu line and the Épinay–Le Tréport line.

It is served by TER Hauts-de-France trains from Le Tréport-Mers to Beauvais.

Service is with ATER X 73500, XGC and on occasion modernised X 4630 railcars.

== See also ==
- List of SNCF stations in Normandy
