= Blangy-sur-Bresle station =

French railway station

Blangy-sur-Bresle
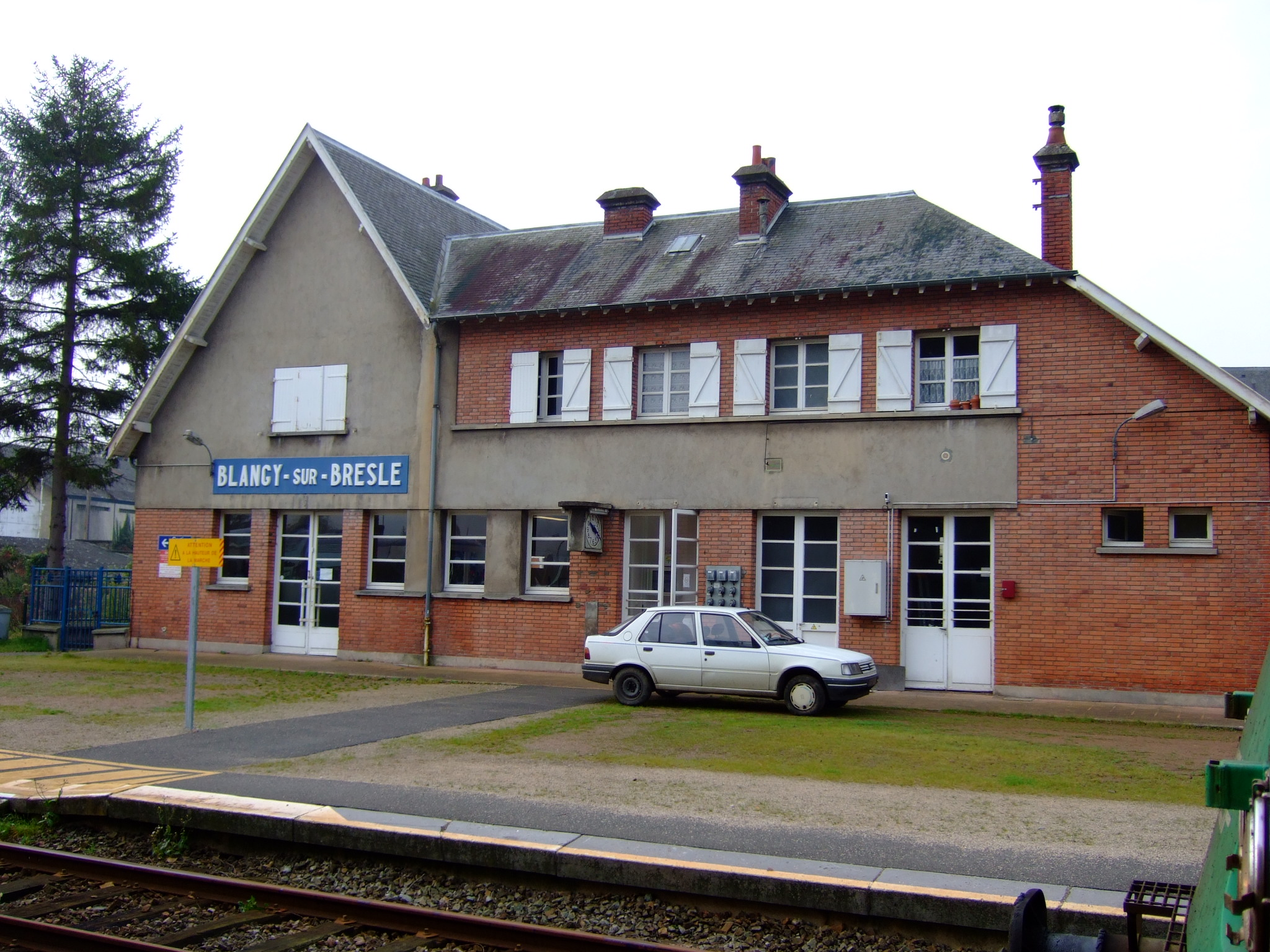

General information
- Coordinates: 49°55′57″N 1°37′33″E
- Owner: RFF/SNCF
- Line: Épinay-Villetaneuse–Le Tréport-Mers railway
- Platforms: 2
- Tracks: 2

Other information
- Station code: 87313809

Services
Preceding station	TER Hauts-de-France	Following station
Aumale towards Beauvais	Proxi P30	Longroy-Gamaches towards Le Tréport-Mers
Location

The Gare de Blangy-sur-Bresle (Blangy-sur-Bresle Station) is a railway station in the commune of Blangy-sur-Bresle in the Seine-Maritime department, France. The station is served by TER Hauts-de-France trains from Beauvais to Le Tréport-Mers.

== See also ==
- List of SNCF stations in Normandy
