= Eu-la Mouillette station =

Former French railway station

Gare d'Eu-la-Mouillette
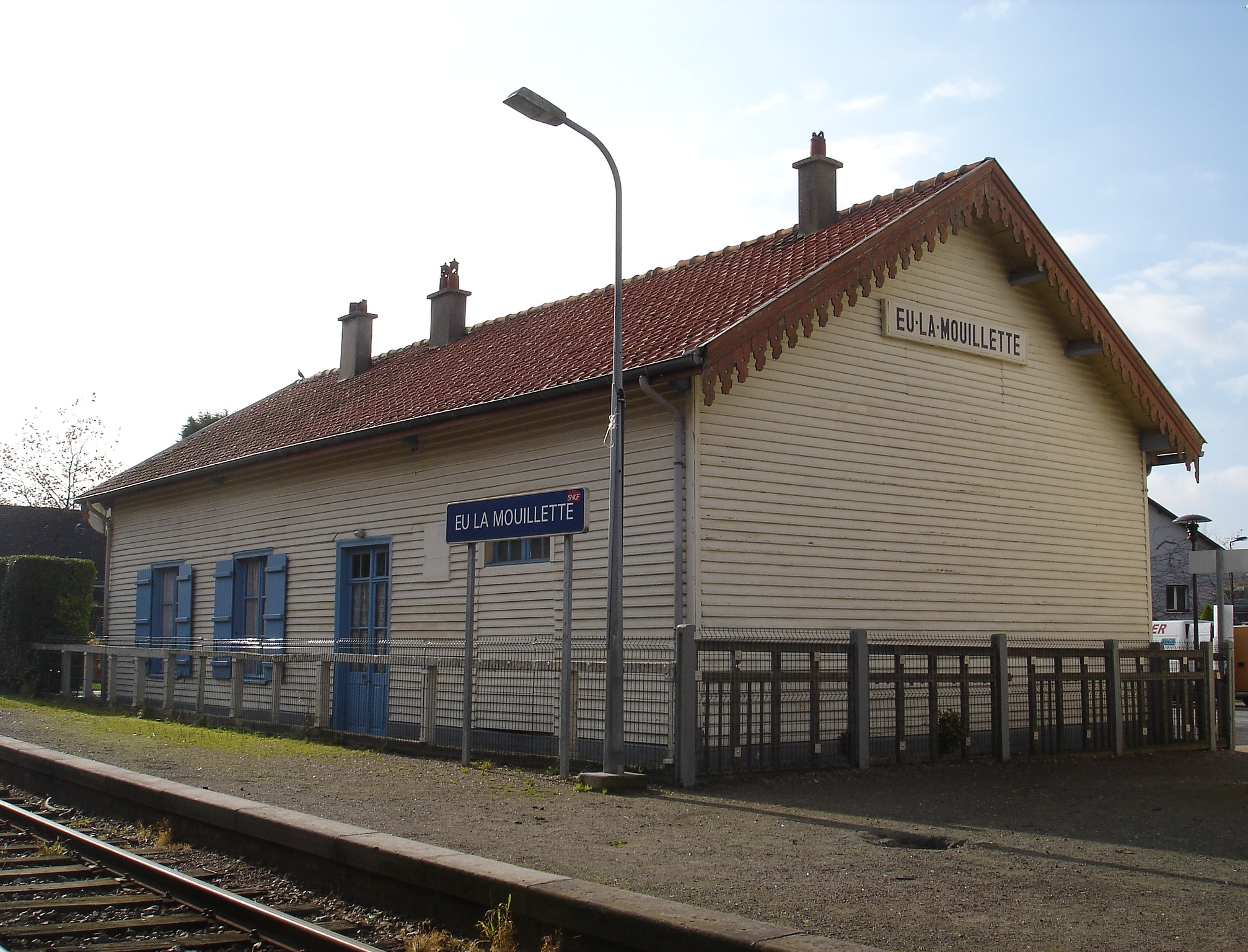

General information
- Location: Eu
- Coordinates: 50°2′56″N 1°25′32″E
- Owner: RFF/SNCF
- Line: Épinay-Villetaneuse–Le Tréport-Mers railway
Location

The gare d'Eu-la-Mouillette (Eu-la Mouillette Station) is a former railway station in the commune of Eu in the Seine-Maritime department, France.

The station was served by TER Picardie trains from Beauvais to Le Tréport-Mers. Although it is closer to the town centre of Eu, it is not the main station: that is Eu station. It was closed in 2011.

== See also ==
- List of SNCF stations in Hauts-de-France
