= Aumale station =

French rail station

Aumale
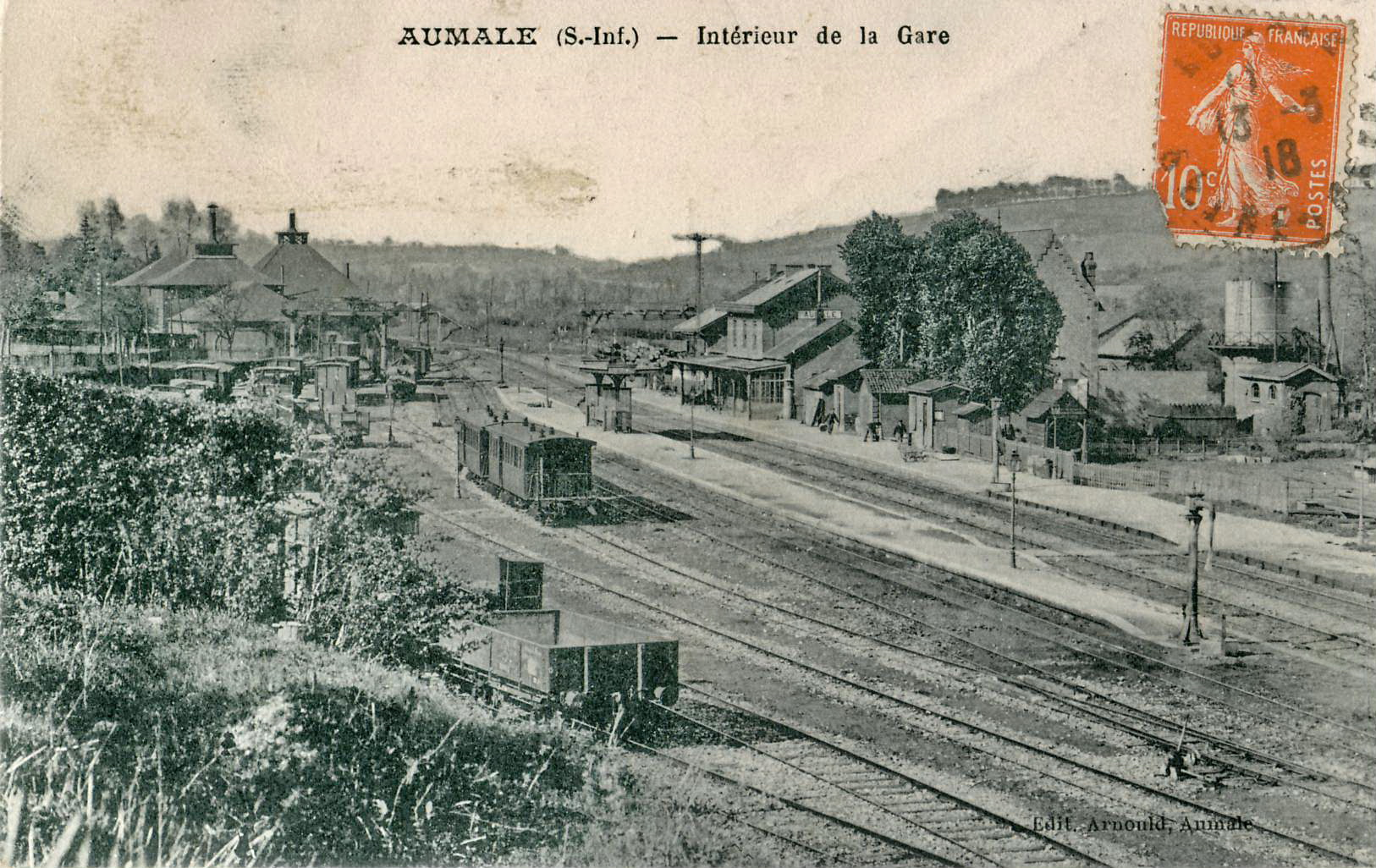

General information
- Location: Avenue Charles de Gaulle, Aumale
- Coordinates: 49°45′54″N 1°45′21″E
- Owner: RFF/SNCF
- Line: Épinay-Villetaneuse–Le Tréport-Mers railway
- Platforms: 2 lateral

Other information
- Station code: 87313767

Services
Preceding station	TER Hauts-de-France	Following station
Abancourt towards Beauvais	Proxi P30	Blangy-sur-Bresle towards Le Tréport-Mers
Location

Gare d'Aumale (Aumale Station) is a rail station in the commune of Aumale in the Seine-Maritime department, France. It is served by TER Hauts-de-France trains from Beauvais to Le Tréport-Mers.

== See also ==
- List of SNCF stations in Normandy
