= Laboissière–Le Déluge station =

French railway station

Laboissière–Le Déluge
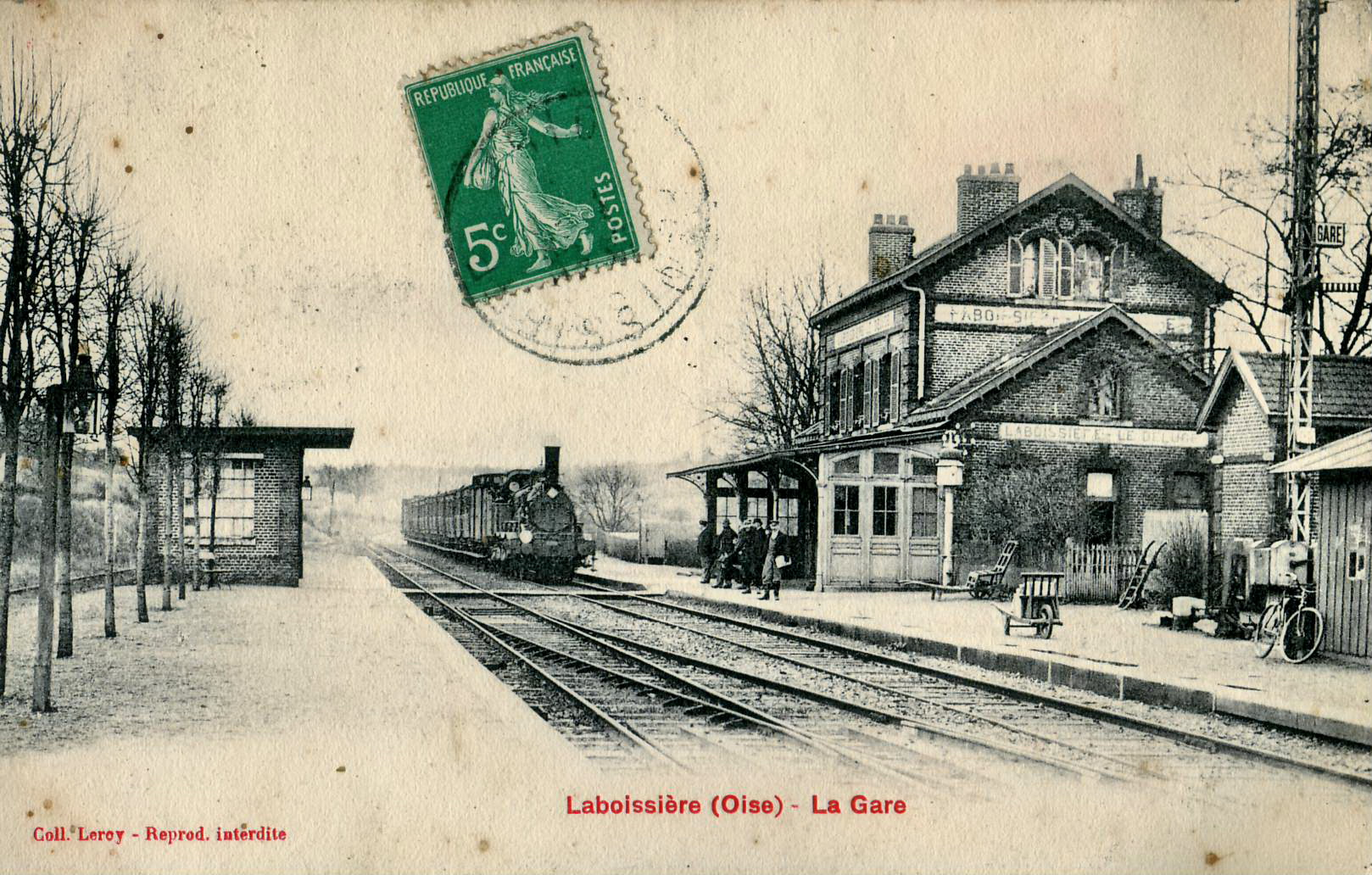
- The station in the early 20th century

General information
- Location: Laboissière-en-Thelle, France
- Coordinates: 49°17′19″N 2°08′10″E
- Owner: SNCF
- Line: Épinay-Villetaneuse–Le Tréport-Mers railway

Other information
- Station code: 87313676

Services
Preceding station	TER Hauts-de-France	Following station
Méru towards Paris-Nord	Citi C17	Saint-Sulpice–Auteuil towards Beauvais
Location

Laboissière–Le Déluge is a railway station located in Laboissière-en-Thelle near Le Déluge in the Oise department, France. It is served by TER Hauts-de-France trains from Paris-Nord to Beauvais.

== See also ==
- List of SNCF stations in Hauts-de-France
