= Saint-Sulpice, Oise =

Saint-Sulpice
- Commune
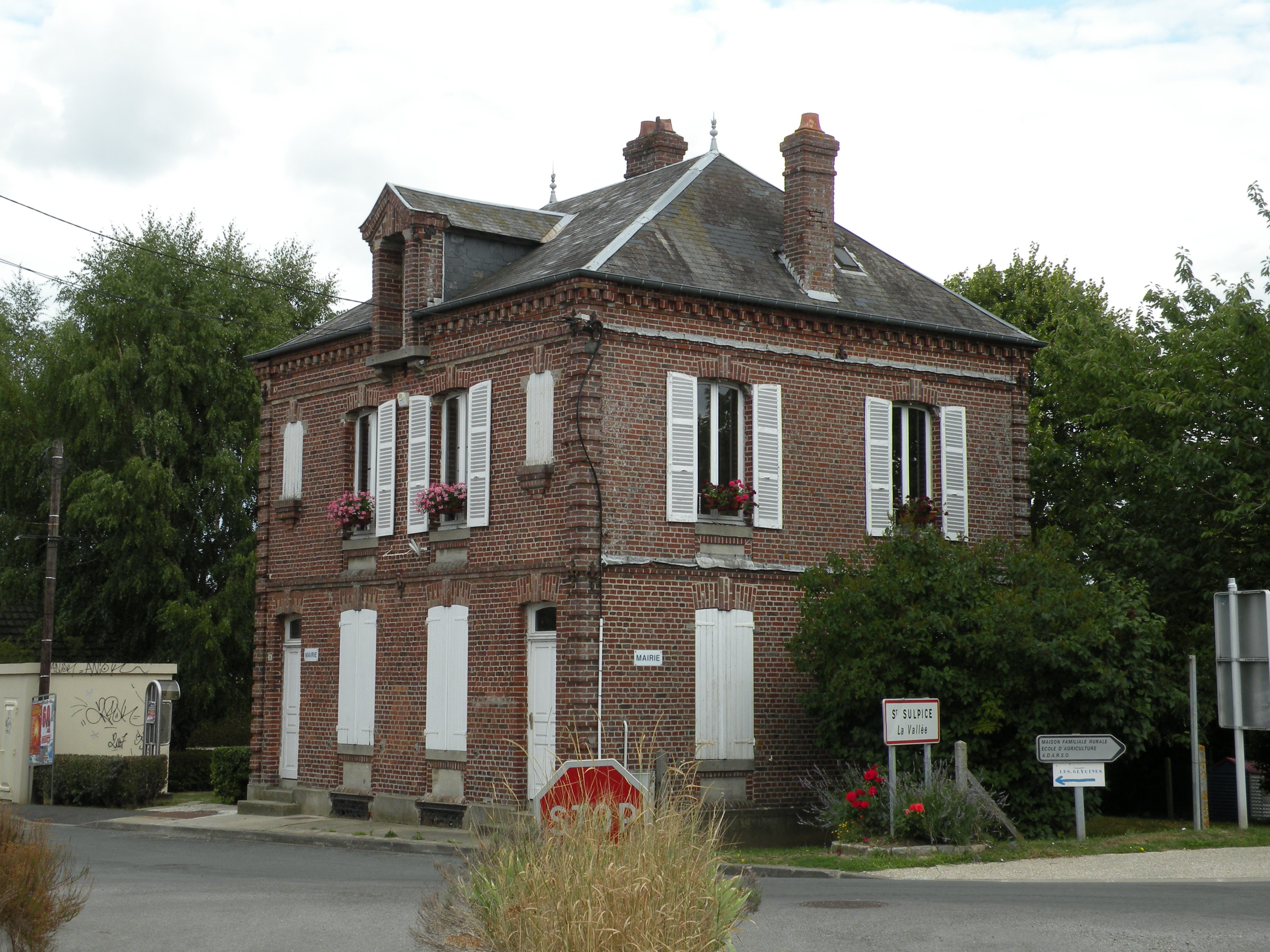
- The town hall in Saint-Sulpice
- Location of Saint-Sulpice
- Location within France Location within Hauts-de-France
- Coordinates: 49°21′05″N 2°07′30″E
- Country: France
- Region: Hauts-de-France
- Department: Oise
- Arrondissement: Beauvais
- Canton: Chaumont-en-Vexin

Government
  - Mayor (2020–2026): Philippe Van Der Haegen
- Area^{1}: 8.88 km^{2} (3.43 sq mi)
- Elevation: 115 m (377 ft)
- Highest elevation: 170 m (560 ft)
- Lowest elevation: 84 m (276 ft)
- Population (2023): 1,079
  - Density: 122/km^{2} (315/sq mi)
- Time zone: UTC+01:00 (CET)
  - Summer (DST): UTC+02:00 (CEST)
- INSEE/Postal code: 60598 /60430
- ^{1} French Land Register data, which excludes lakes, ponds, glaciers > 1 km^{2} (0.386 sq mi or 247 acres) and river estuaries.

Saint-Sulpice (French pronunciation: [sɛ̃ sylpis]) is a commune in the Oise department in northern France. Saint-Sulpice-Auteuil station has rail connections to Beauvais and Paris.

== See also ==
- Communes of the Oise department
