= Longroy =

- Commune
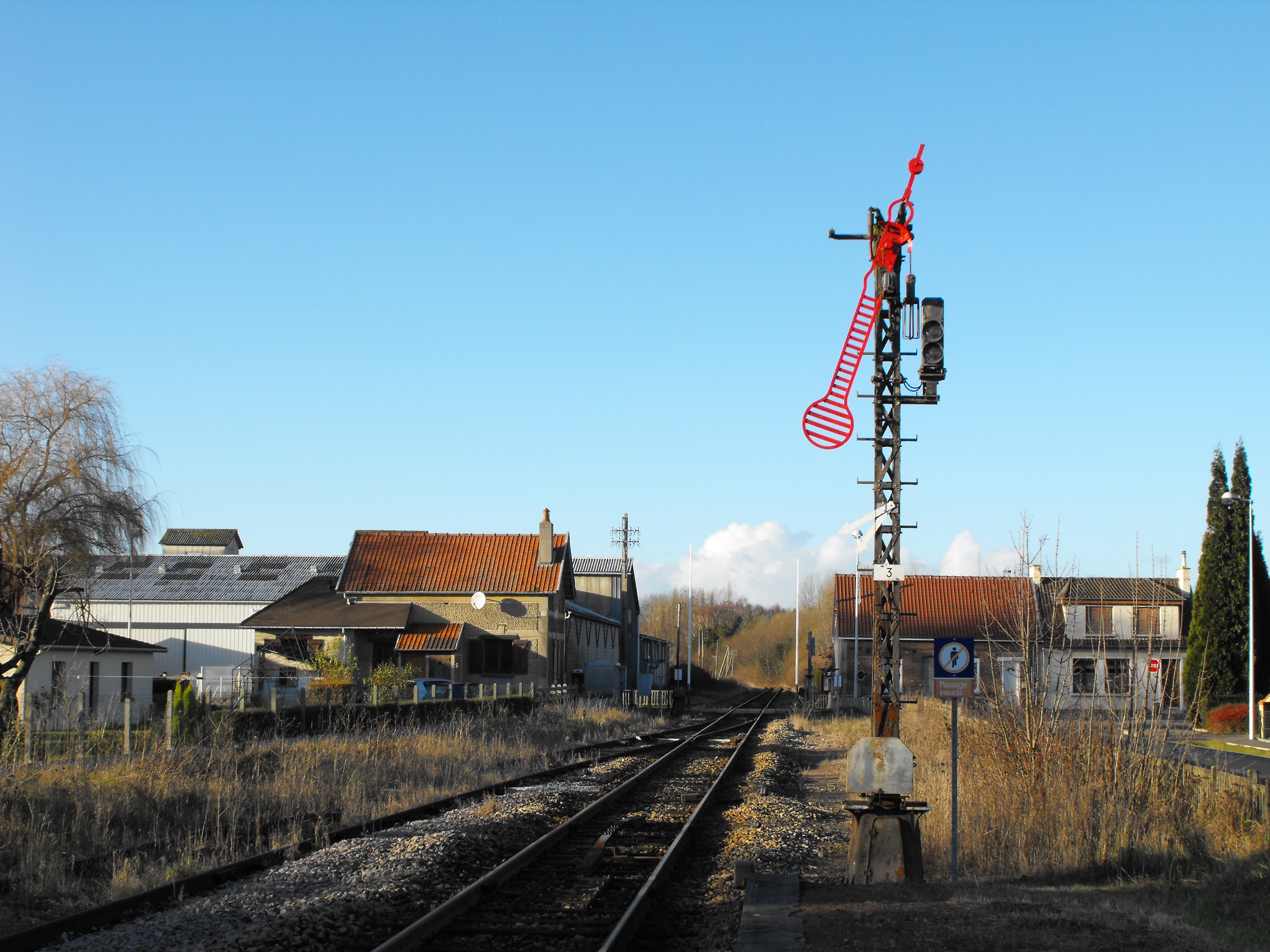
- The railway at Longroy-Gamaches
- Location of Longroy
- Location within France Location within Normandy
- Coordinates: 49°59′23″N 1°32′15″E
- Country: France
- Region: Normandy
- Department: Seine-Maritime
- Arrondissement: Dieppe
- Canton: Eu
- Intercommunality: CC Villes Sœurs

Government
  - Mayor (2026–32): Jean-Pierre Troley
- Area^{1}: 5.32 km^{2} (2.05 sq mi)
- Elevation: 25 m (82 ft)
- Highest elevation: 150 m (490 ft)
- Lowest elevation: 20 m (66 ft)
- Population (2023): 637
  - Density: 120/km^{2} (310/sq mi)
- Time zone: UTC+01:00 (CET)
  - Summer (DST): UTC+02:00 (CEST)
- INSEE/Postal code: 76394 /76260
- ^{1} French Land Register data, which excludes lakes, ponds, glaciers > 1 km^{2} (0.386 sq mi or 247 acres) and river estuaries.

Longroy is a commune in the Seine-Maritime department in the Normandy region in northern France.

== Geography ==
A forestry and farming village situated by the banks of the river Bresle in the Pays de Bray, some 21 miles (34 km) east of Dieppe on the D49 at its junction with the D14 road. Longroy-Gamaches station has rail connections to Beauvais and Le Tréport.

== Population ==
Historical population
Year	Pop.	±% p.a.
1968	649	—
1975	683	+0.73%
1982	671	−0.25%
1990	590	−1.60%
1999	611	+0.39%
2007	656	+0.89%
2012	663	+0.21%
2017	634	−0.89%
2023	637	+0.08%
Source: INSEE

== Places of interest ==
- The church dating from the nineteenth century.
- Ruins of a castle.

== See also ==
- Communes of the Seine-Maritime department
