= Laboissière-en-Thelle =

- Commune
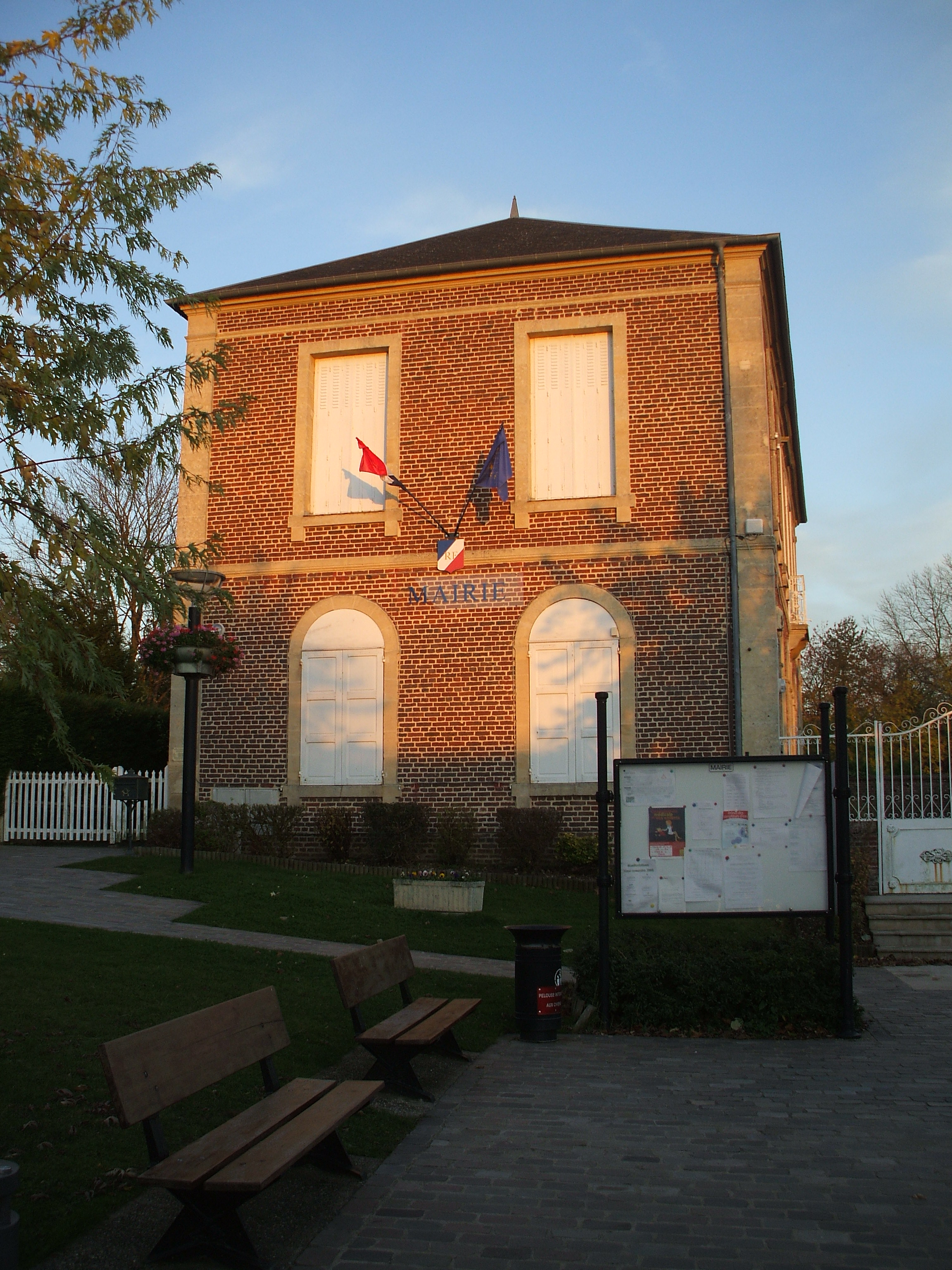
- The town hall in Laboissière-en-Thelle
- Location of Laboissière-en-Thelle
- Location within France Location within Hauts-de-France
- Coordinates: 49°17′25″N 2°09′33″E
- Country: France
- Region: Hauts-de-France
- Department: Oise
- Arrondissement: Beauvais
- Canton: Chaumont-en-Vexin

Government
  - Mayor (2020–2026): Jean-Jacques Thomas
- Area^{1}: 9.64 km^{2} (3.72 sq mi)
- Elevation: 205 m (673 ft)
- Highest elevation: 223 m (732 ft)
- Lowest elevation: 125 m (410 ft)
- Population (2023): 1,326
  - Density: 138/km^{2} (356/sq mi)
- Time zone: UTC+01:00 (CET)
  - Summer (DST): UTC+02:00 (CEST)
- INSEE/Postal code: 60330 /60570
- ^{1} French Land Register data, which excludes lakes, ponds, glaciers > 1 km^{2} (0.386 sq mi or 247 acres) and river estuaries.

Laboissière-en-Thelle (French pronunciation: [labwasjɛʁ ɑ̃ tɛl]) is a commune in the Oise department in northern France. Laboissière-Le Déluge station has rail connections to Beauvais and Paris.

== See also ==
- Communes of the Oise department
