= Saint-Sulpice–Auteuil station =

French railway station

Saint-Sulpice–Auteuil
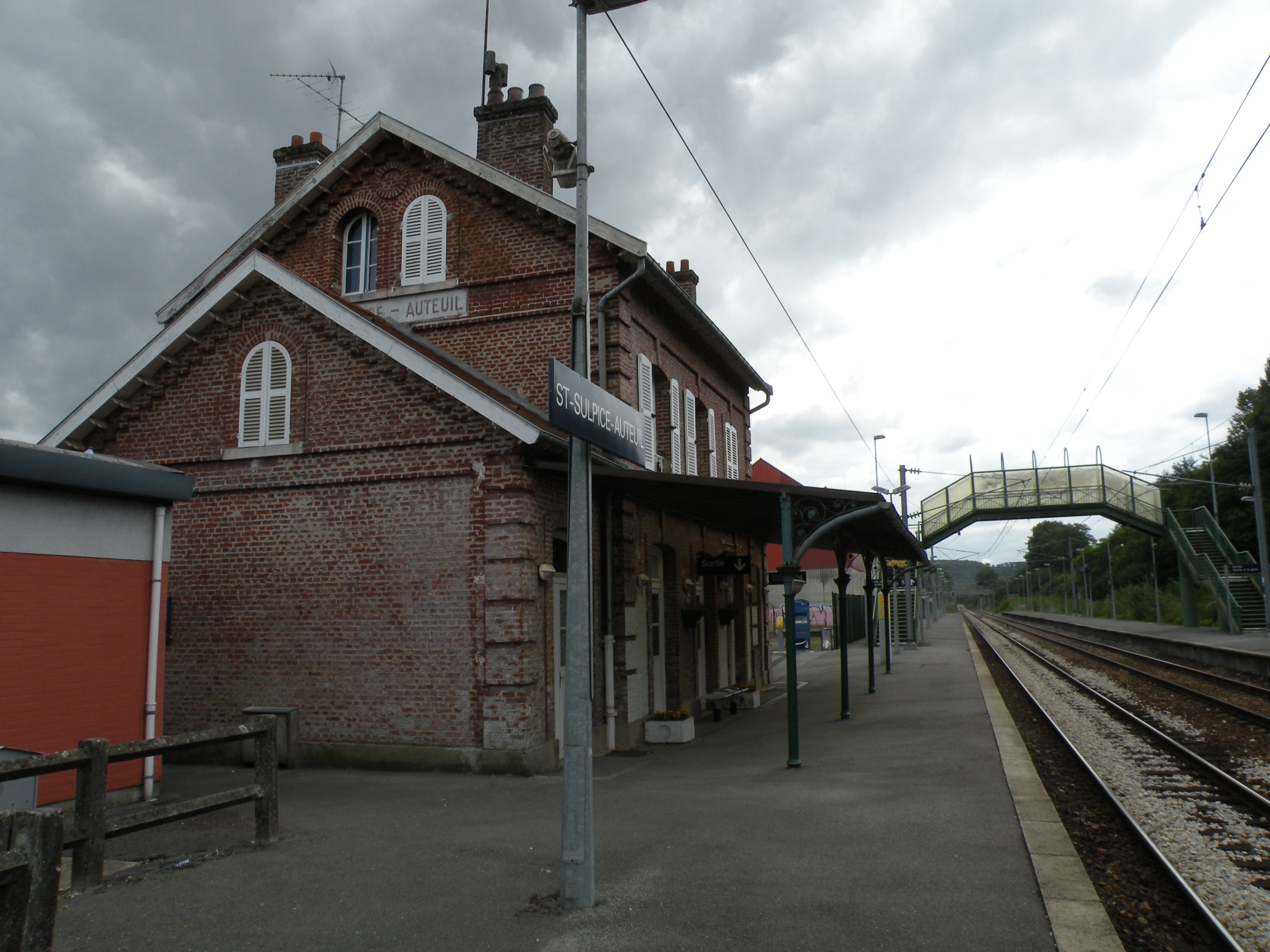

General information
- Location: Saint-Sulpice, France
- Coordinates: 49.3465°N 2.1167°E
- Owner: SNCF
- Line: Épinay-Villetaneuse–Le Tréport-Mers railway

Other information
- Station code: 87313684

Services
Preceding station	TER Hauts-de-France	Following station
Laboissière–Le Déluge towards Paris-Nord	Citi C17	Beauvais Terminus
Location

Saint-Sulpice–Auteuil is a railway station located in Saint-Sulpice near Auteuil in the Oise department, France. It is served by TER Hauts-de-France trains from Paris-Nord to Beauvais.

== See also ==
- List of SNCF stations in Hauts-de-France
