= Allery =

Commune in Hauts-de-France, France

- Commune
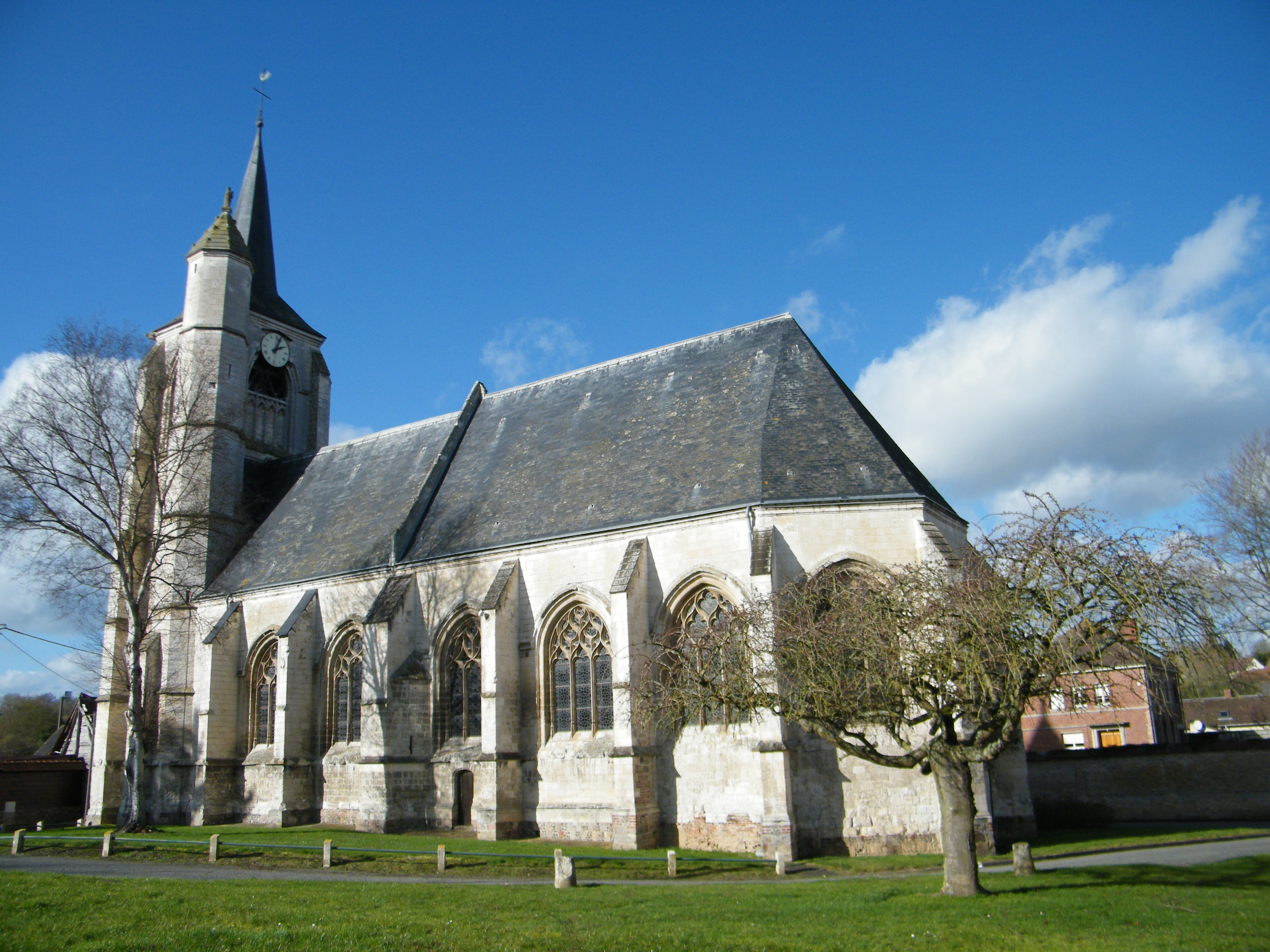
- The church in Allery

- Coat of arms
- Location of Allery
- Location within France Location within Hauts-de-France
- Coordinates: 49°57′55″N 1°54′03″E
- Country: France
- Region: Hauts-de-France
- Department: Somme
- Arrondissement: Abbeville
- Canton: Gamaches
- Intercommunality: CC Somme Sud-Ouest

Government
  - Mayor (2020–2026): François Quignon
- Area^{1}: 13.07 km^{2} (5.05 sq mi)
- Elevation: 28 m (92 ft)
- Highest elevation: 127 m (417 ft)
- Lowest elevation: 28 m (92 ft)
- Population (2023): 843
  - Density: 64.5/km^{2} (167/sq mi)
- Time zone: UTC+01:00 (CET)
  - Summer (DST): UTC+02:00 (CEST)
- INSEE/Postal code: 80019 /80270
- ^{1} French Land Register data, which excludes lakes, ponds, glaciers > 1 km^{2} (0.386 sq mi or 247 acres) and river estuaries.

Allery (French pronunciation: [alʁi]) is a commune in the Somme department in Hauts-de-France in northern France.

== Geography ==
The commune is situated 25 km (16 mi) south of Abbeville, at the junction of the D193 and D76 roads.

== Population ==
Historical population
Year	Pop.	±% p.a.
1968	911	—
1975	863	−0.77%
1982	790	−1.25%
1990	736	−0.88%
1999	752	+0.24%
2007	760	+0.13%
2012	806	+1.18%
2017	793	−0.32%
2023	843	+1.02%
Source: INSEE

== Places and monuments ==
- War Memorial
- twelfth century church

== See also ==
Communes of the Somme department
