= Le Tréport =

- Commune
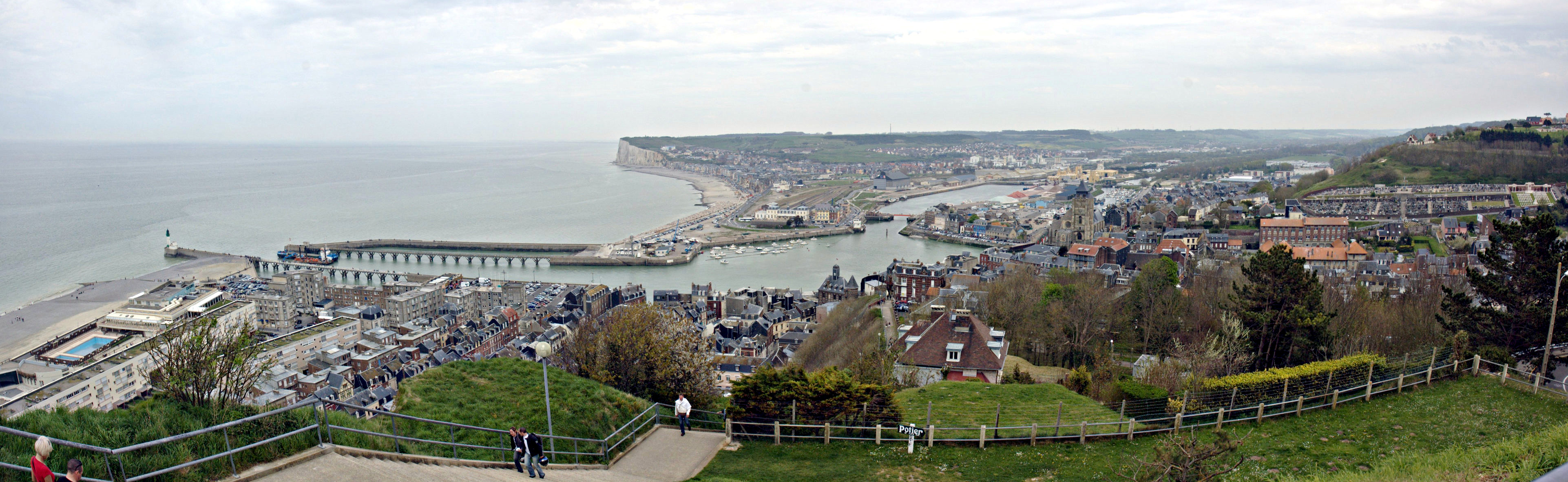
- A general view of Le Tréport

- Coat of arms
- Location of Le Tréport
- Location within France Location within Normandy
- Coordinates: 50°04′N 1°22′E
- Country: France
- Region: Normandy
- Department: Seine-Maritime
- Arrondissement: Dieppe
- Canton: Eu
- Intercommunality: CC Villes Sœurs

Government
  - Mayor (2026–32): Laurent Jacques (PCF)
- Area^{1}: 6.77 km^{2} (2.61 sq mi)
- Elevation: 20 m (66 ft)
- Highest elevation: 103 m (338 ft)
- Lowest elevation: 0 m (0 ft)
- Population (2023): 4,378
  - Density: 647/km^{2} (1,670/sq mi)
- Time zone: UTC+01:00 (CET)
  - Summer (DST): UTC+02:00 (CEST)
- INSEE/Postal code: 76711 /76470
- ^{1} French Land Register data, which excludes lakes, ponds, glaciers > 1 km^{2} (0.386 sq mi or 247 acres) and river estuaries.

Le Tréport (French pronunciation: [lə tʁepɔʁ]) is a port town in the Seine-Maritime department in Normandy, France.

The three adjoining towns of Le Tréport, Eu and Mers-les-Bains are known locally as the "Three Sisters".

== Geography ==
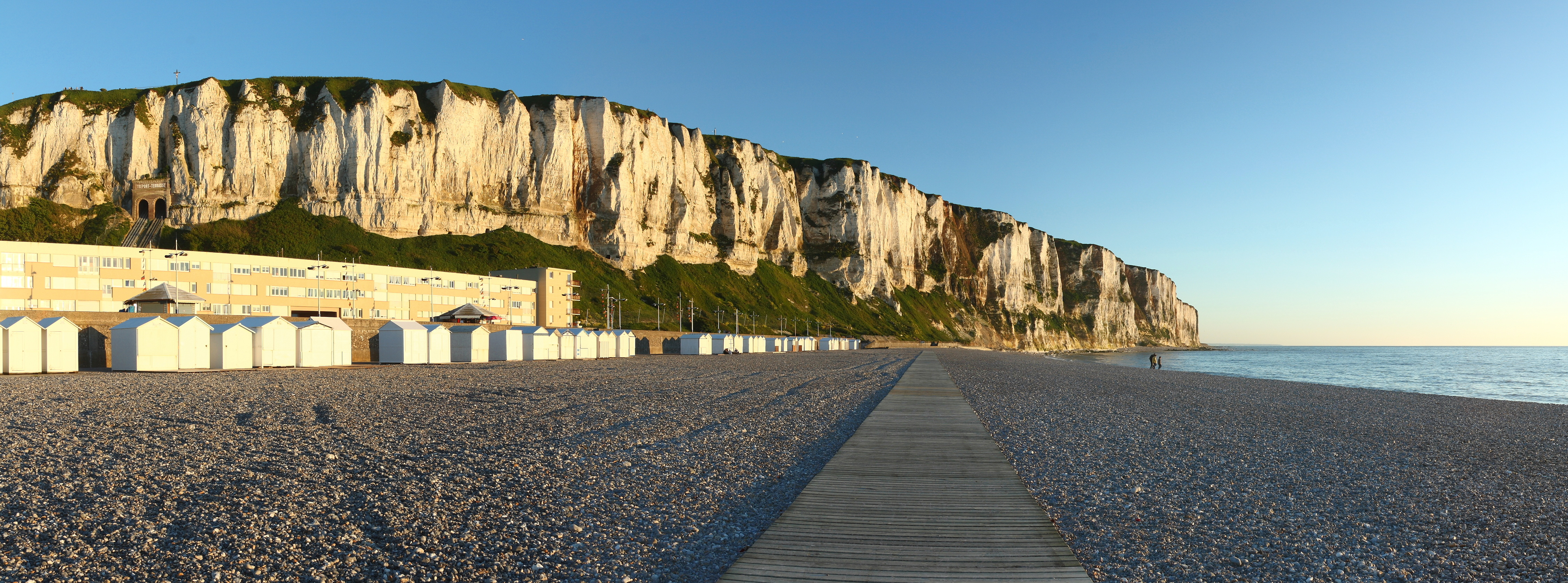
Le Tréport's cliffs at sunset.

A small fishing port and light industrial town situated in the Pays de Caux, some 21 miles (34 km) northeast of Dieppe at the junction of the D 940, the D 78 and the D 1015 roads. The mouth of the river Bresle meets the English Channel here, in between the high (110 metres or 360 feet) chalk cliffs and the pebbly beach. Le Tréport-Mers station has rail connections to Beauvais. Le Tréport is also a sea-side resort and home to a casino.

== History ==
Le Tréport (the ancient Ulterior Portus) was a port of some note in the Middle Ages, when it experienced several invasions by English forces.

Louis Philippe I twice received Queen Victoria at Tréport, in 1843 and 1845.

The patronage of Louis-Philippe and his family, residing regularly in Eu, inaugurated Le Tréport as a popular seaside resort. The Parisian upper middle class wasted no time in building villas on the waterfront and led a social life there until the eve of the Second World War. The Tréport-Mers railway station, opened on 12 May 1872, gave Parisians access to the seaside resort and stirred its development. A casino was built in 1896–1897. An electric tramway served the city from 1902, as a corollary of the tourist trade. (The operation of the Eu-Le Tréport-Mers tramway ceased in 1934.)

The British World War I soldier and later author, Arthur Stanley Bullock, who was stationed in Le Tréport after the Armistice in 1918, was captivated by the town, nestling at the bottom of cliffs which could be ascended by 365 steps or by a cliff railway. Bullock recorded in a memoir: "The sea floor must have been covered by multicoloured sands, for on a clear day, looking from the cliffs straight down into the sea, it seemed that one was looking at a vast abstract canvas of blues, yellows, reds and greens." While staying there, Bullock also painted a study of a French fisher girl with a basket on her back.

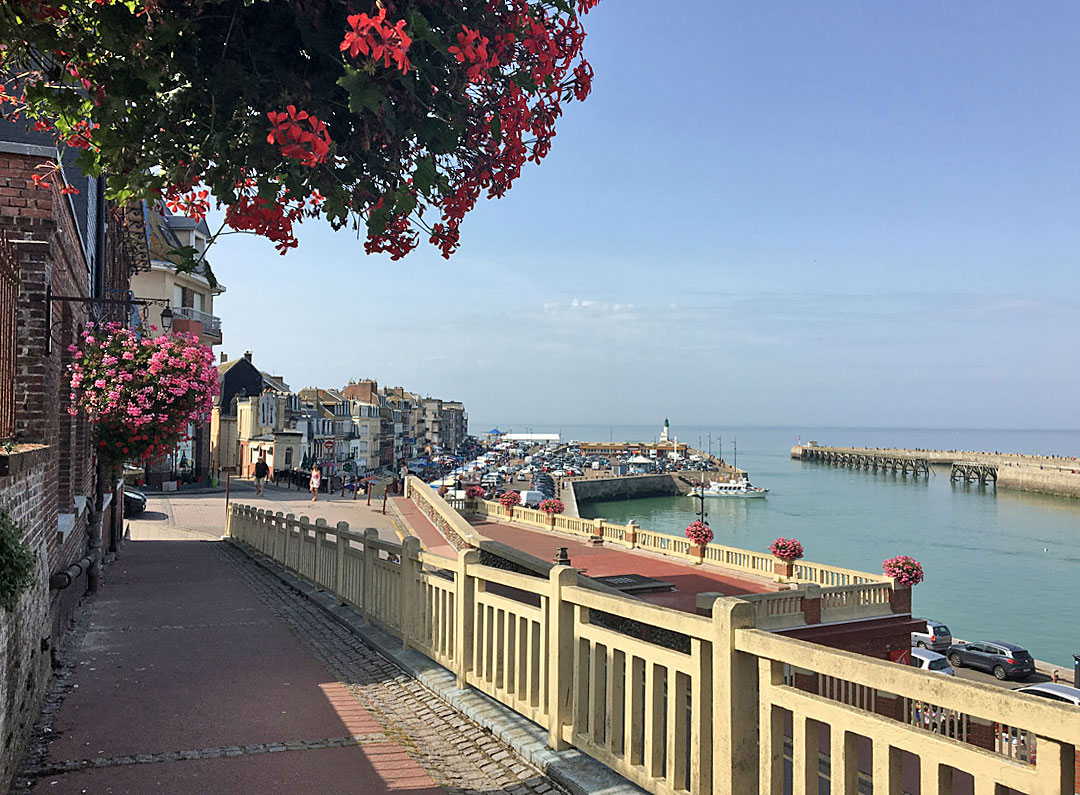
Le Tréport.

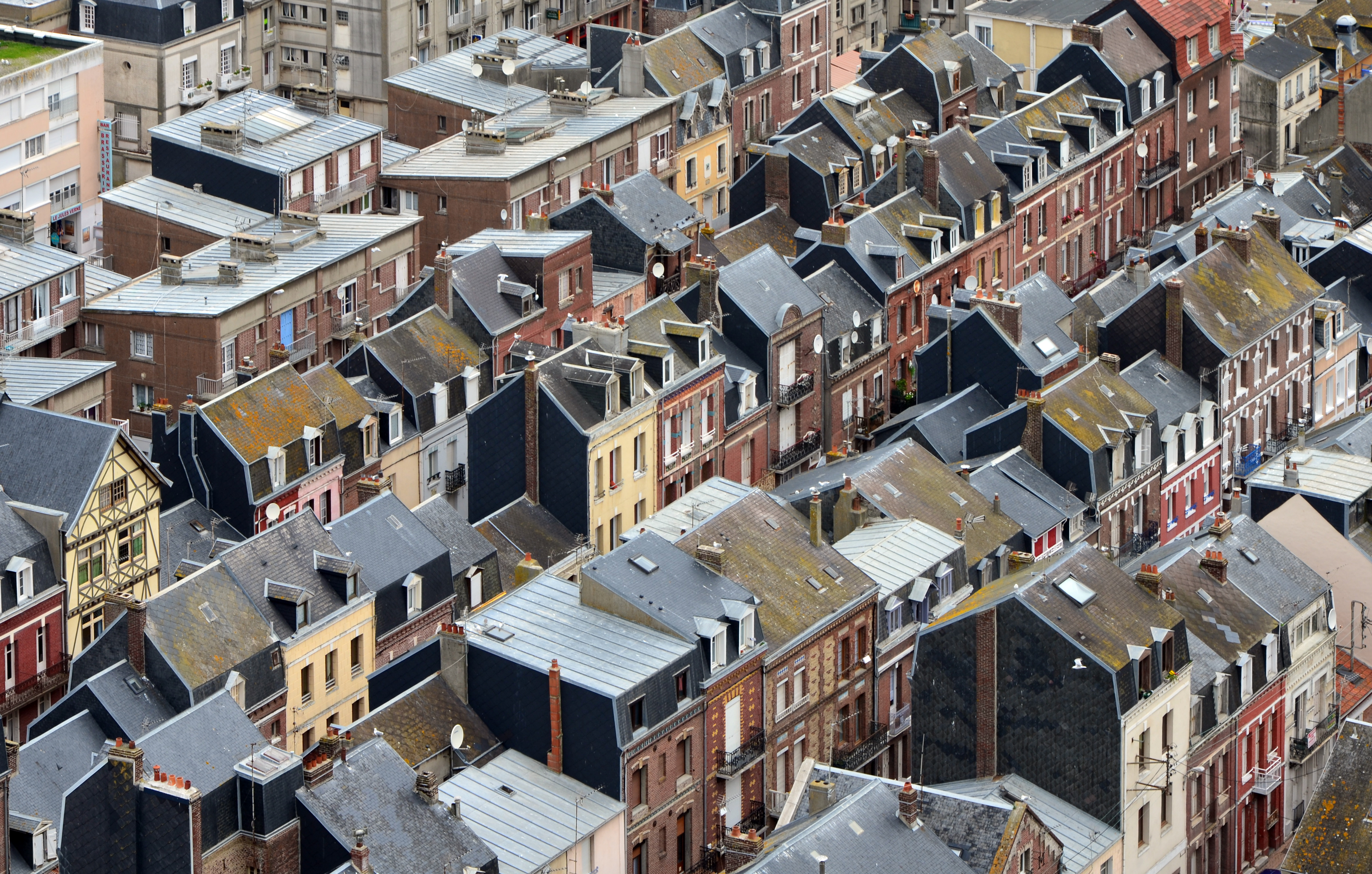
Aerial view of the town.

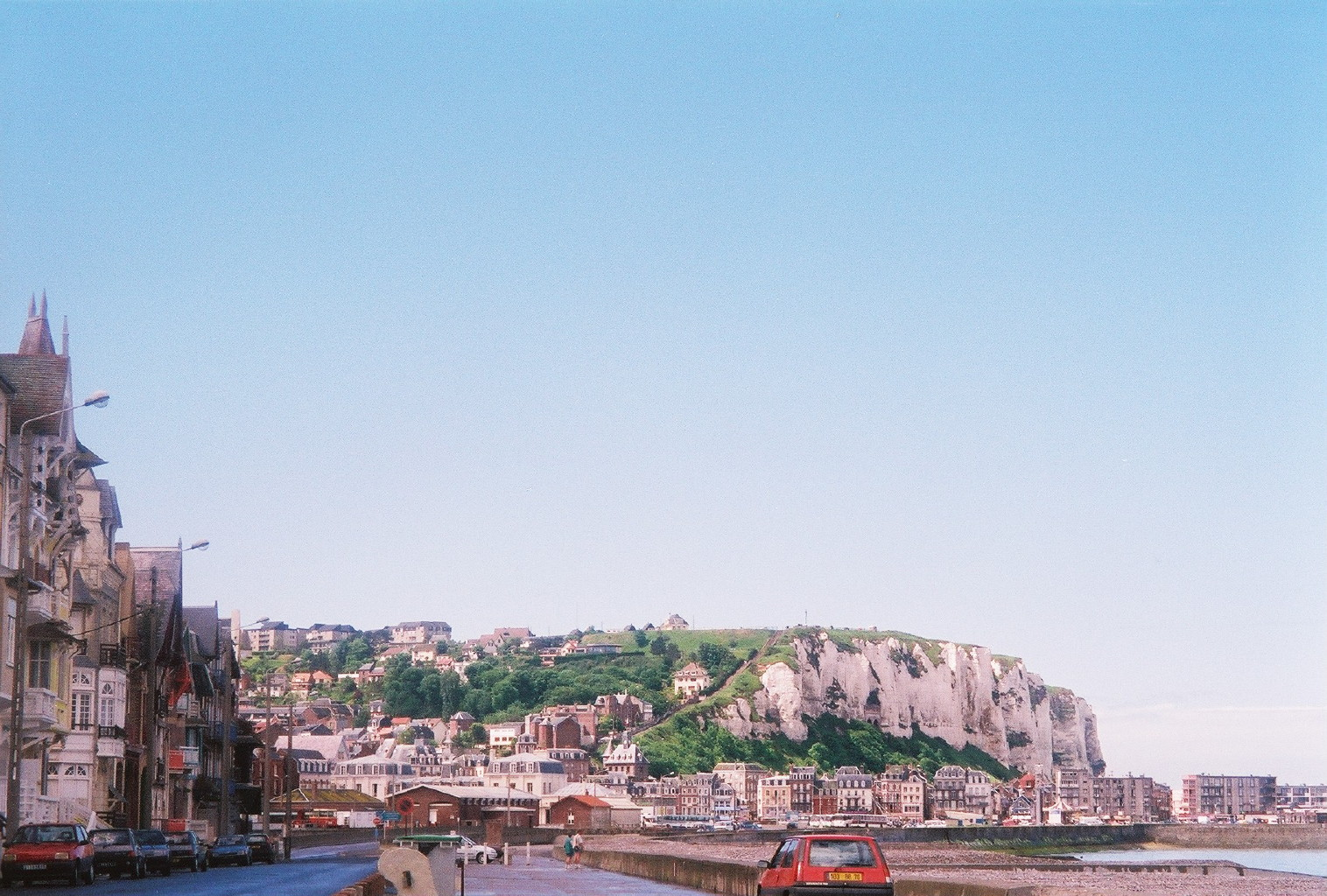
A view of Le Tréport.

Under German occupation in 1940–44, the town's inhabitants experienced the hardships and oppression shared by other parts of northern France. This included deportation of residents to concentration camps. A college in Tréport was subsequently named after Rachel Salmona, a 10-year-old girl interned in nearby camps at Dieppe and Drancy, before deportation to the more notorious Auschwitz in February 1943. Rachel, her sister, mother, father and grandmother all died as a result of deportation.

To deter Allied landings in the Tréport area, the German Army tunnelled into the sea cliffs, creating several subterranean galleries. (This tunnel complex, which bears the name of Kahl-Burg [French language article], has since been made more accessible and has been opened to visitors.)

Most of the villas in Tréport were destroyed during the Normandy campaign of 1944. The town was liberated by the 3rd Canadian Division on 1 September 1944.

Peace was followed by efforts to restore and increase Tréport's appeal as a tourist destination. Reconstructed architecture features prominently on the beachfront.

Until the 1970s, an oyster bed, where visitors could taste the freshest possible seafood, was located at the very end of the pier, just below the cliffs.

== Population ==
Historical population
Year	Pop.	±% p.a.
1968	6,328	—
1975	6,816	+1.07%
1982	6,455	−0.77%
1990	6,227	−0.45%
1999	5,900	−0.60%
2007	5,728	−0.37%
2012	5,217	−1.85%
2017	4,870	−1.37%
2023	4,378	−1.76%
Source: INSEE

== Administration ==
The current mayor of Le Tréport is Laurent Jacques of the PCF political party. He became 1st vice-mayor following the 2014 municipal elections (2014-2020). He took over as mayor in January 2016 upon the death of his predecessor Alain Longuent (PCF).

== Main sights ==
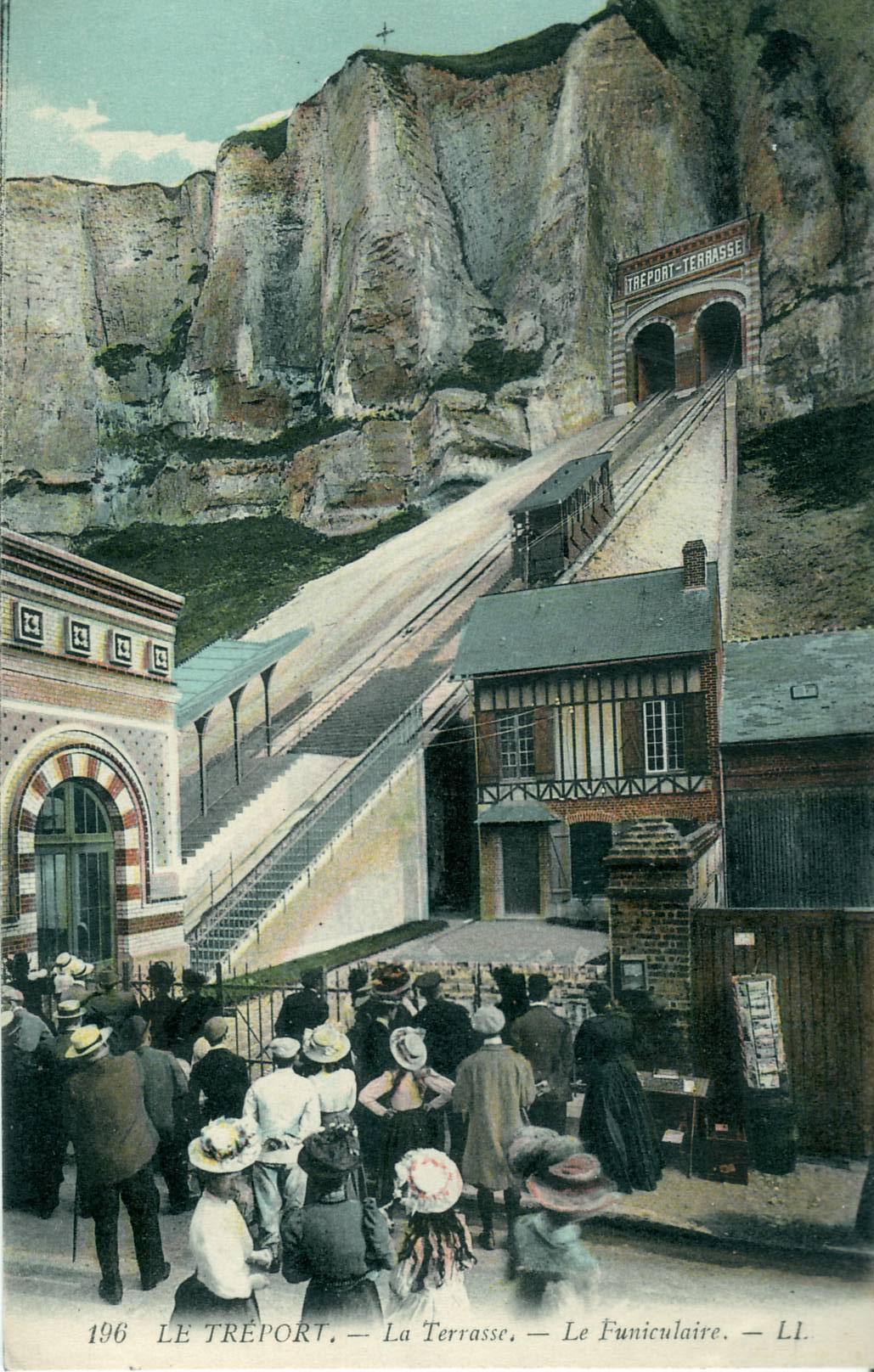
The 1908 funicular

- The remains of an eleventh-century abbey
- The chapel of St. Julien
- The lighthouse
- The new funicular, built in 1907–08, and restored in 2006, linking the town with the cliff-tops
- The church of St. Jacques du Tréport, dating from the fourteenth century
- Two museums (the Vieux Tréport museum and the local history museum)

== Prominent residents ==
- Paul Paray, conductor, was born in Le Tréport in 1886.

== In popular culture ==
Le Tréport was used as the location for the 2014 French police thriller Witnesses ("Les témoins"). The series, which was written by Hervé Hadmar and Marc Herpoux, starred Thierry Lhermitte and Marie Dompnier. Its style and tempo have been compared to Scandinavian noir such as Wallander, The Bridge and The Killing.

It formed the background for François Ozon's 2020 film Summer of 85.

It is the scene of Dominique Choisy's 2017 film My Life with James Dean.

== See also ==
- Communes of the Seine-Maritime department
- The works of Maxime Real del Sarte
