= Maisnières =

- Commune
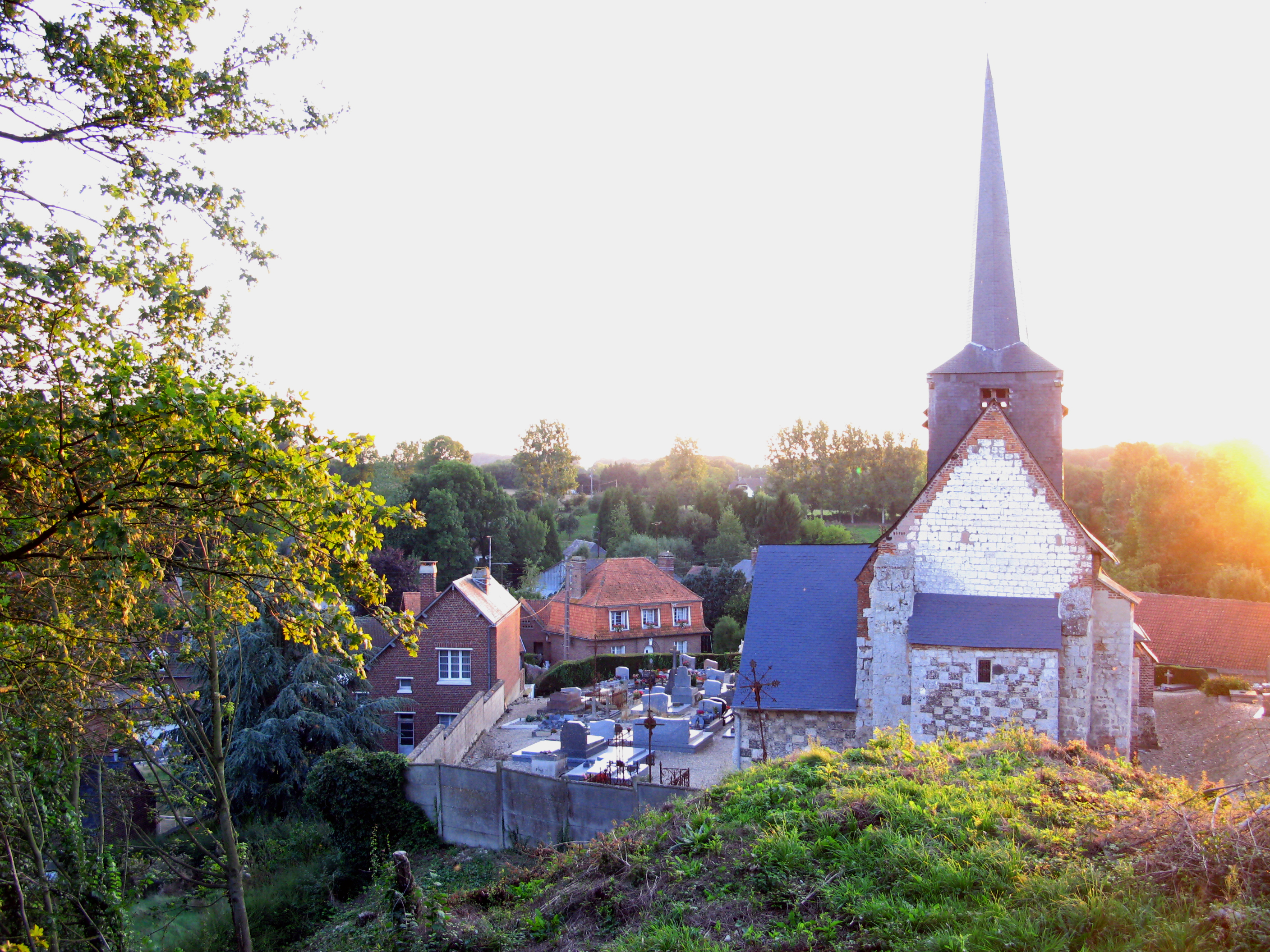
- The church in Maisnières

- Coat of arms
- Location of Maisnières
- Location within France Location within Hauts-de-France
- Coordinates: 50°00′58″N 1°37′02″E
- Country: France
- Region: Hauts-de-France
- Department: Somme
- Arrondissement: Abbeville
- Canton: Gamaches
- Intercommunality: CC Aumale - Blangy-sur-Bresle

Government
  - Mayor (2020–2026): Bernard Thiébault
- Area^{1}: 12.73 km^{2} (4.92 sq mi)
- Elevation: 71 m (233 ft)
- Highest elevation: 116 m (381 ft)
- Lowest elevation: 39 m (128 ft)
- Population (2023): 472
  - Density: 37.1/km^{2} (96.0/sq mi)
- Time zone: UTC+01:00 (CET)
  - Summer (DST): UTC+02:00 (CEST)
- INSEE/Postal code: 80500 /80220
- ^{1} French Land Register data, which excludes lakes, ponds, glaciers > 1 km^{2} (0.386 sq mi or 247 acres) and river estuaries.

Maisnières (French pronunciation: [mɛnjɛʁ]; or Maisnières-en-Vimeu; Picard: Mainniére-in-Vimeu) is a commune in the Somme department in Hauts-de-France in northern France.

== Geography ==
The commune is situated on the D22 and D190 crossroads, some 12 miles (19 km) southwest of Abbeville. The commune is traversed by the river Vimeuse, a small tributary of the Bresle. Access to the A28 autoroute is about 5 miles (8.0 km) distant.

=== Hamlets and other places ===
The commune comprises seven inhabited areas. Courtieux, Ferme Touvent, Visse, Monchelet, Handrechy, Harcelaines and Maisnières.

- The name Maisnières (Mesnières, Maineria, Mainera, Manerioe, Magnera) comes perhaps, from Maisnie or Maisnil (eng: manor or noble home), or from Mansio, named from resting places on the Roman Road, the Chaussée Brunehault.
- Courtieux (Courthieux, Courtils, Courtillets) perhaps from ‘’courtil’’, a garden, though others suggest Cort, a habitation around a square, and til, torching or cob).
- Visse (Vy, Vis, Vitz). From the Latin "vicus" or "via", because of the Roman road nearby. Roman coins and pottery have been found in the village since the 19th century.
- Monchelet and Haudrechy (once known as Andrechies) are made up of some houses and a watermill. The name Monchelet may come from Moncella or Montis-Cella.
- Harcelaines (previously Herselaine and Hercheleine) was never in the old parish of Maisnières but was amalgamated into the commune in 1972.

== Population ==
Historical population

Year	Pop.	±% p.a.
1793	602	—
1851	775	+0.44%
1901	540	−0.72%
1926	565	+0.18%
1931	539	−0.94%
1936	560	+0.77%
1946	558	−0.04%
1954	566	+0.18%
1962	569	+0.07%

Year	Pop.	±% p.a.
1968	536	−0.99%
1975	528	−0.21%
1982	562	+0.90%
1990	545	−0.38%
1999	505	−0.84%
2007	512	+0.17%
2012	521	+0.35%
2017	516	−0.19%
2023	472	−1.47%

Source: EHESS and INSEE (1968-2023)

== History ==
In 879, the Normans were pillaging the Vimeu region, but were defeated in 881 by Louis III of France at the Battle of Saucourt, at the very gates of Maisnières. All the towns of the Vimeu were then fortified to try to keep out the Normans. In 1459, the château and ownership of Maisnières was sold to the abbey of Corbie for about 220 écus d'or. The abbots of Corbie, as masters of Maisnières, collected tithes and were also responsible for justice.
Maisnières cultivated hops in the 17th century.
A century later, the hamlets of Courtieux, Harcelaines and Monchelet were joined into the one parish.
The railway arrived in 1872, as part of the line serving Frévent to Gamaches.
A single-storey schoolhouse was built in 1878. A second floor was added in 1954 so that two classes could be taught separately. The school was used as a billet for Australian troops during World War I, as was the château.

During the Second World War, the Germans occupied homes, the old presbytery and the château, which served as the Kommandantur. On 3 July 1944, a V1 rocket fell on the homes between the church and the presbytery. It killed 3 children from one family and wounded a dozen others. It had been launched from a site less than 3 miles (4.8 km) way, at Longuemort and had failed to take off properly. Maisnières was liberated on 2 September 1944 by a Canadian armoured division on their way to Abbeville, where they joined up with the 1st Polish armoured division, to drive out the Germans.

== Places of interest ==
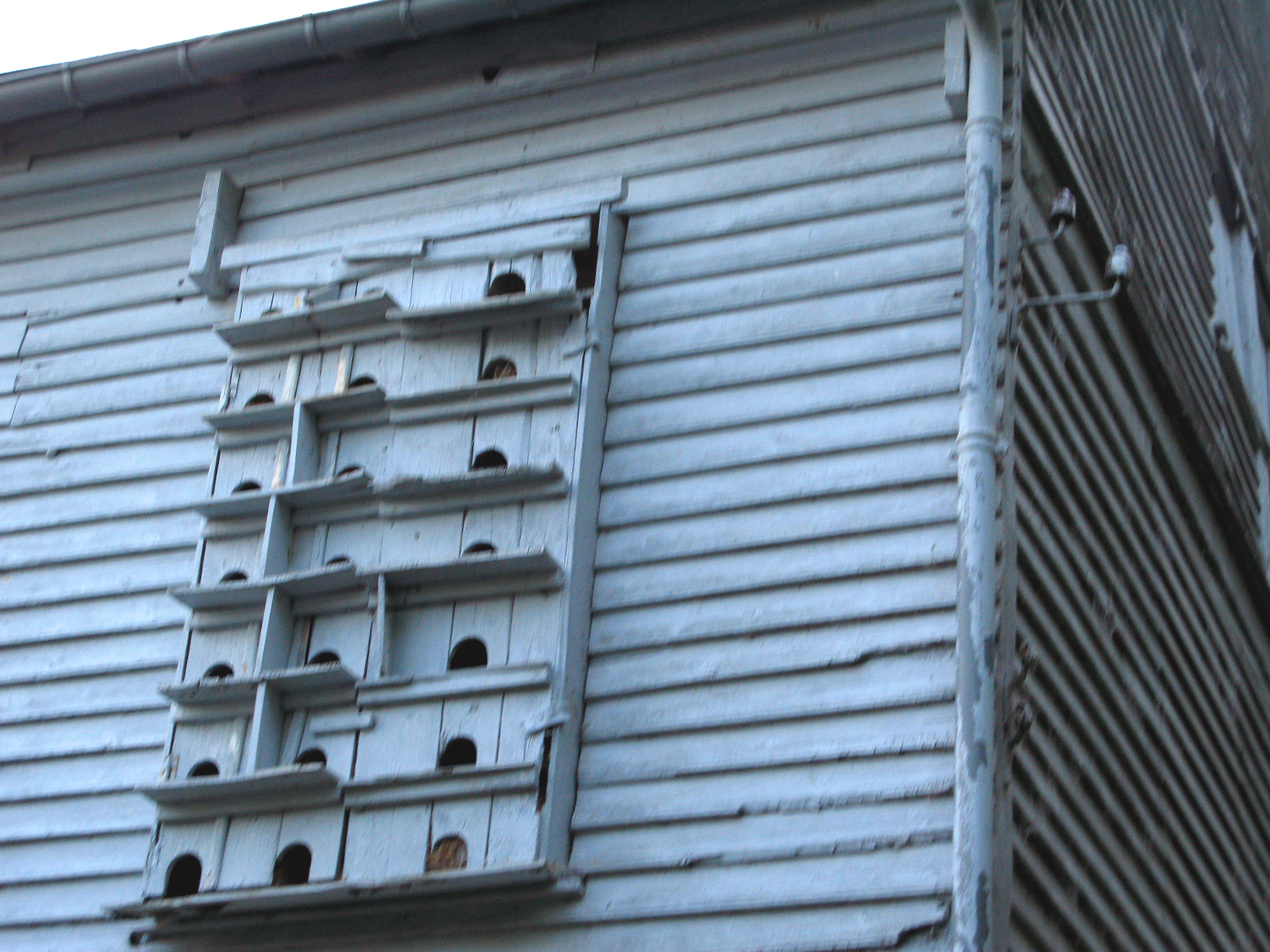
Dovecote at the Visse watermill

== Visse watermill ==
Fed by the waters of the river Vimeuse, this is the last survivor of 14 mills that once worked along the river. It was owned by the abbey of Corbie but confiscated during the French Revolution and sold. In 1837, the miller sought and got permission to build a new mill upstream, the present mill. The wheel was restored in 1992 and can be seen from a small bridge.

On an engineer's map from 1854, there appears to be three active watermills on the Vimeuse. A windmill, owned by the abbey of Corbie, once stood on the small hill in Visse.

== The medieval château of the De Maisnières family ==
Only a small part of the motte wall still stands, 35 m long by 25 m high, on the flat top of the hill near the church, dominating the neighbourhood to the south and the west. It was destroyed between the years 1380–1400. The family that owned the castle died out in the following years, having been lords (seigneurs there for 200 years. The first lord, Guy de Maisnières, the first of that name built the castle when Guillaume, Count of Ponthieu, in November 1218, established irrefutably that Guy was the next-born brother to his own father, Jean, Count of Ponthieu.

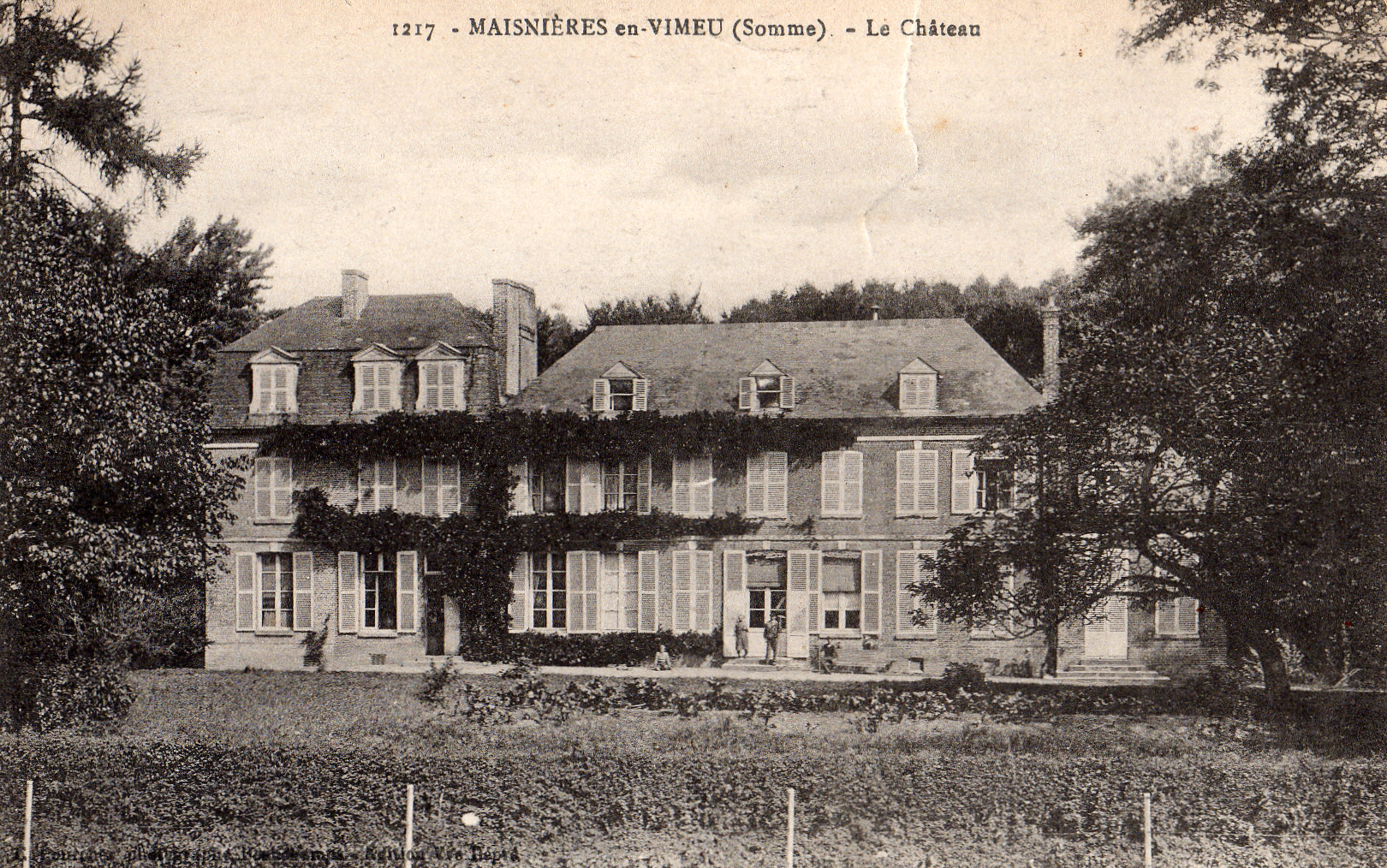
The facade

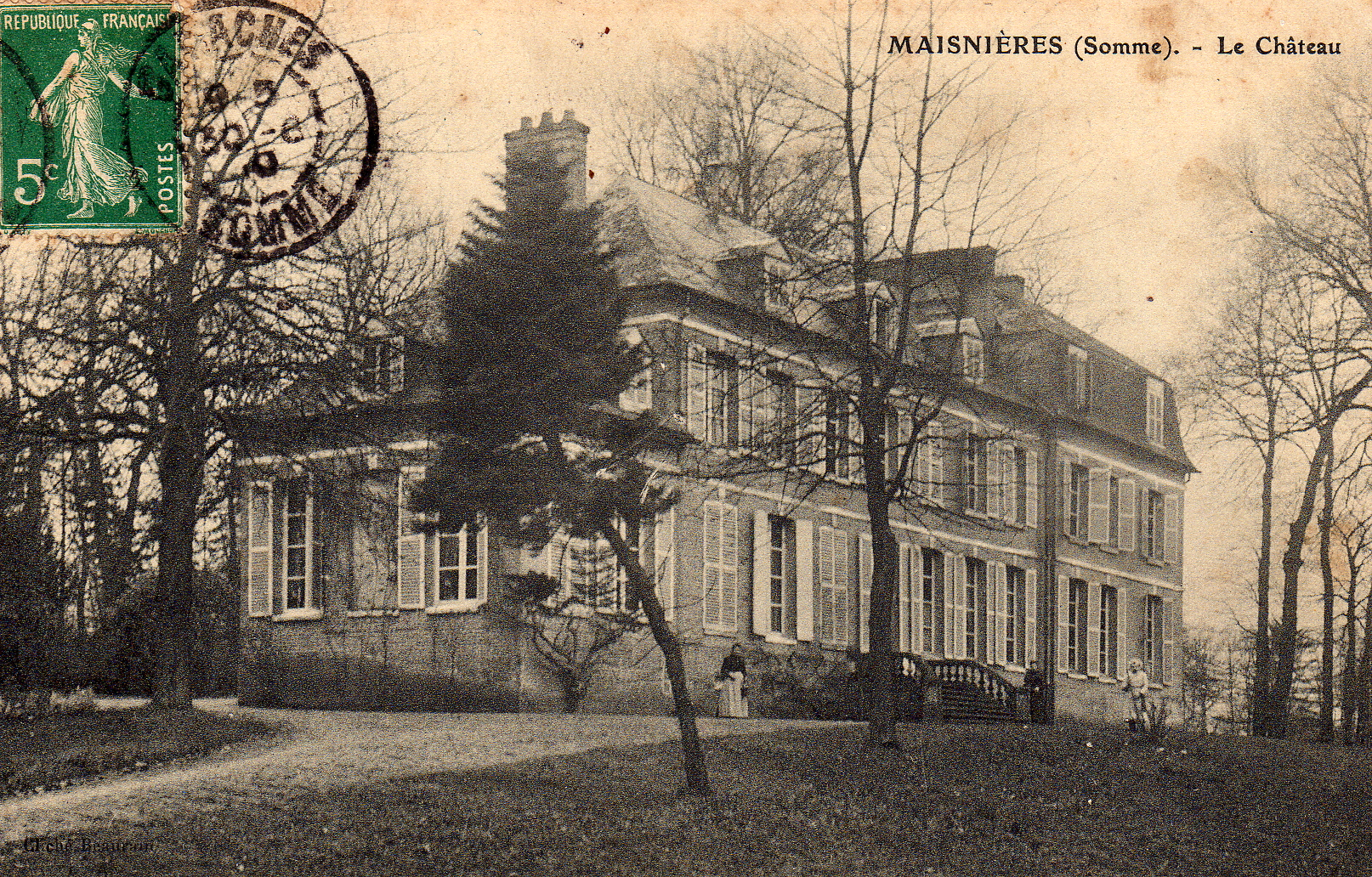
The back view

== Château of Harcelaines ==
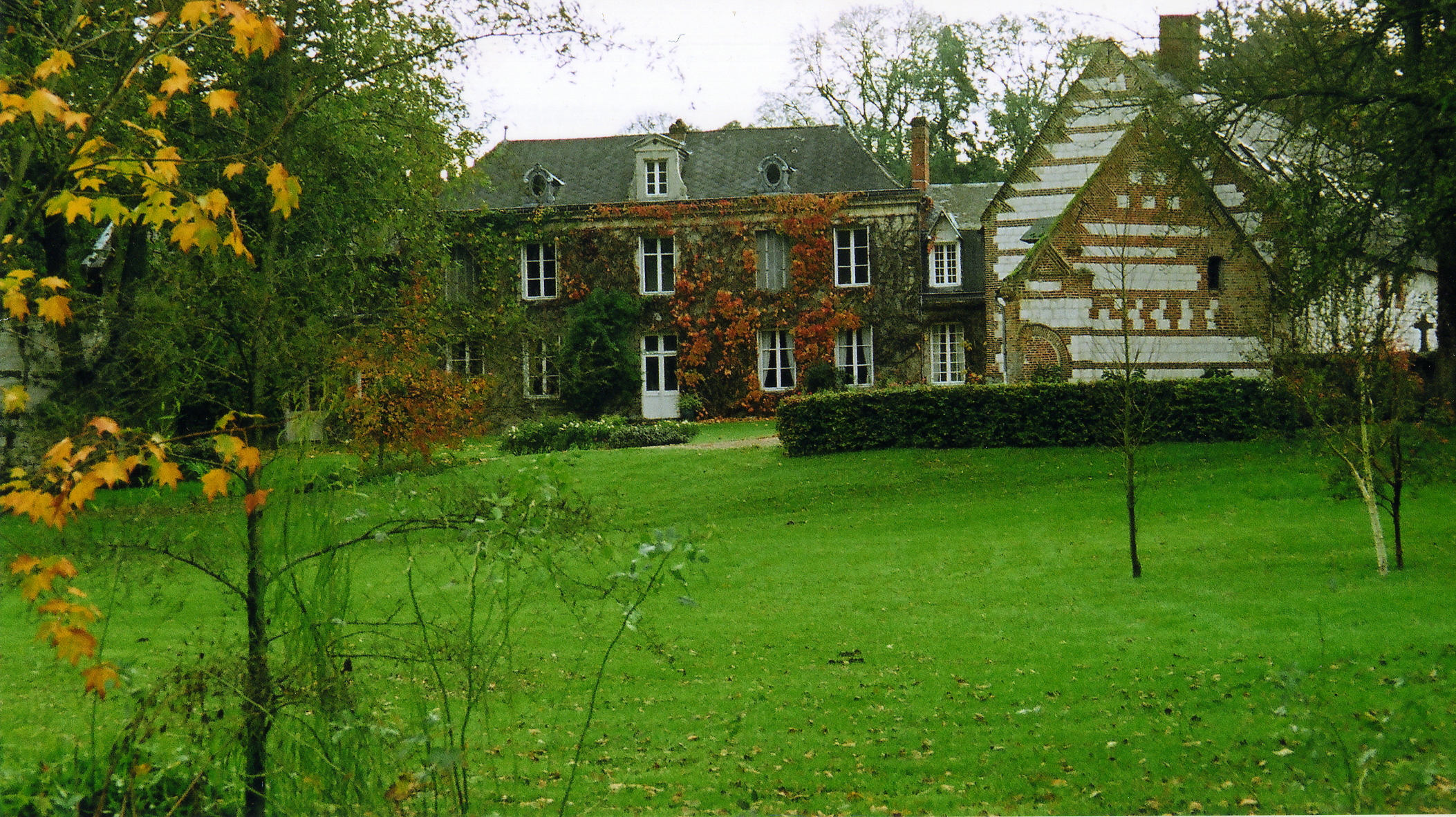
Château of Harcelaines

A small 16th / 17th château in brick and stone adjoined by a 16th-century chapel with a classical garden covering three hectares (7.4 acres). There are water features and an English garden and also a flower collection including ferns, narcissus and poppies.

== Maisnières church ==
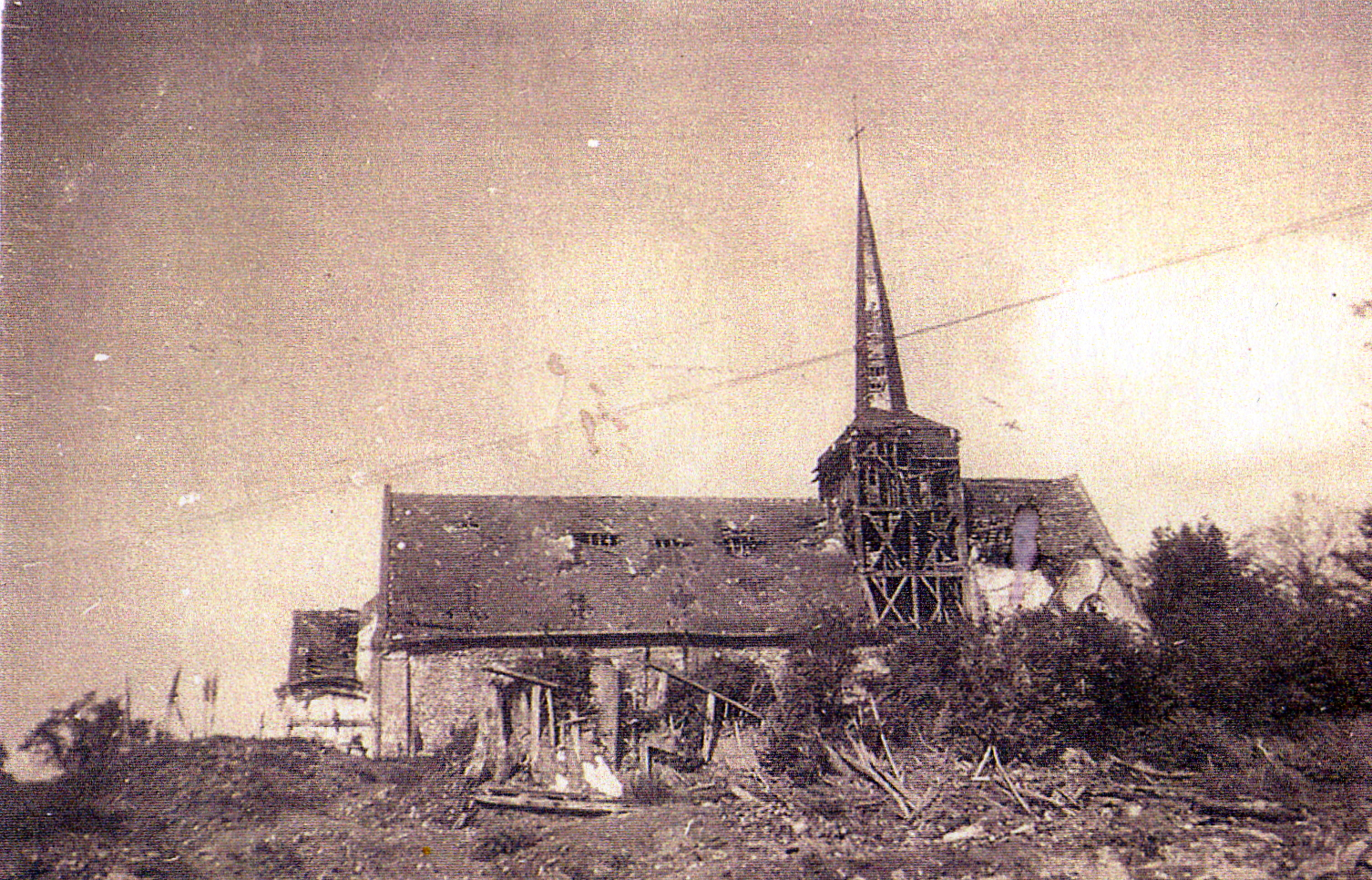
The church after the V1 fell

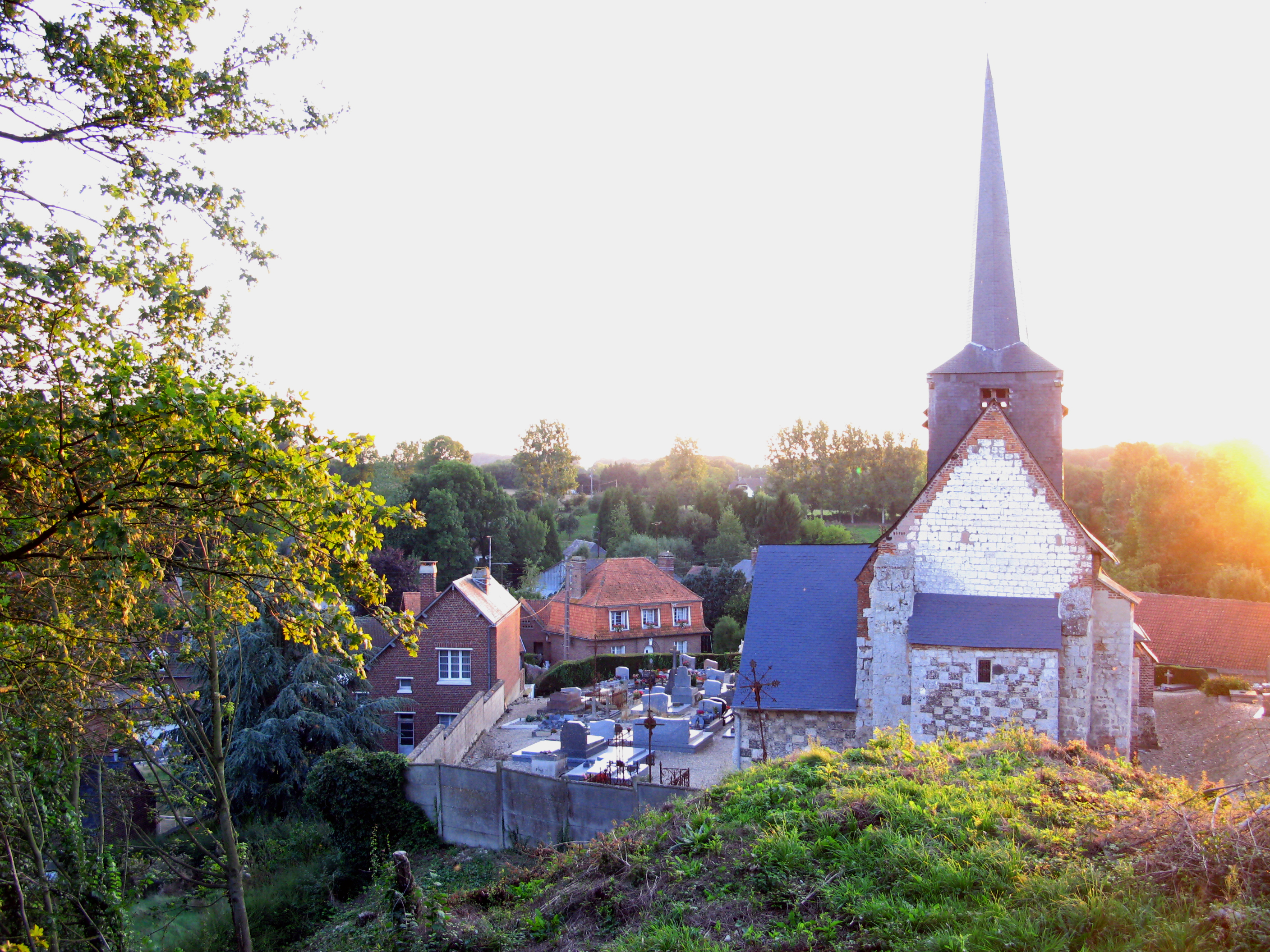
The church from the motte

Saint Crispin’s church at Maisnières was built at the foot of the motte of the old castle. The bell-tower, with its slate-covered spire, was built over an earlier tower.

== Harcelaines church ==
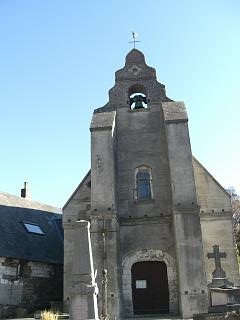
Harcelaines church.

The church at Harcelaines is dedicated to Saint Saturnin has a bell-wall.

== Employment ==
Agriculture is the main occupation within the commune, though in earlier times, sawmills (brought in by the Spanish) and sewing gave work to many of the inhabitants.

The coming of the railway stimulated the economic activities of the villages. A station opened in Maisnières on 9 May 1872. During the sugarbeet harvesting season, 16 trains a day were loaded. All the local lines were closed between 1972 and 1975.

Monchelet, hamlet of Maisnières, had a very busy dairy and cheese-making business from 1900 to 1977. Production was principally dedicated to the famous Camembert L'Oiseau bleu, known throughout Picardie and even exported from France.

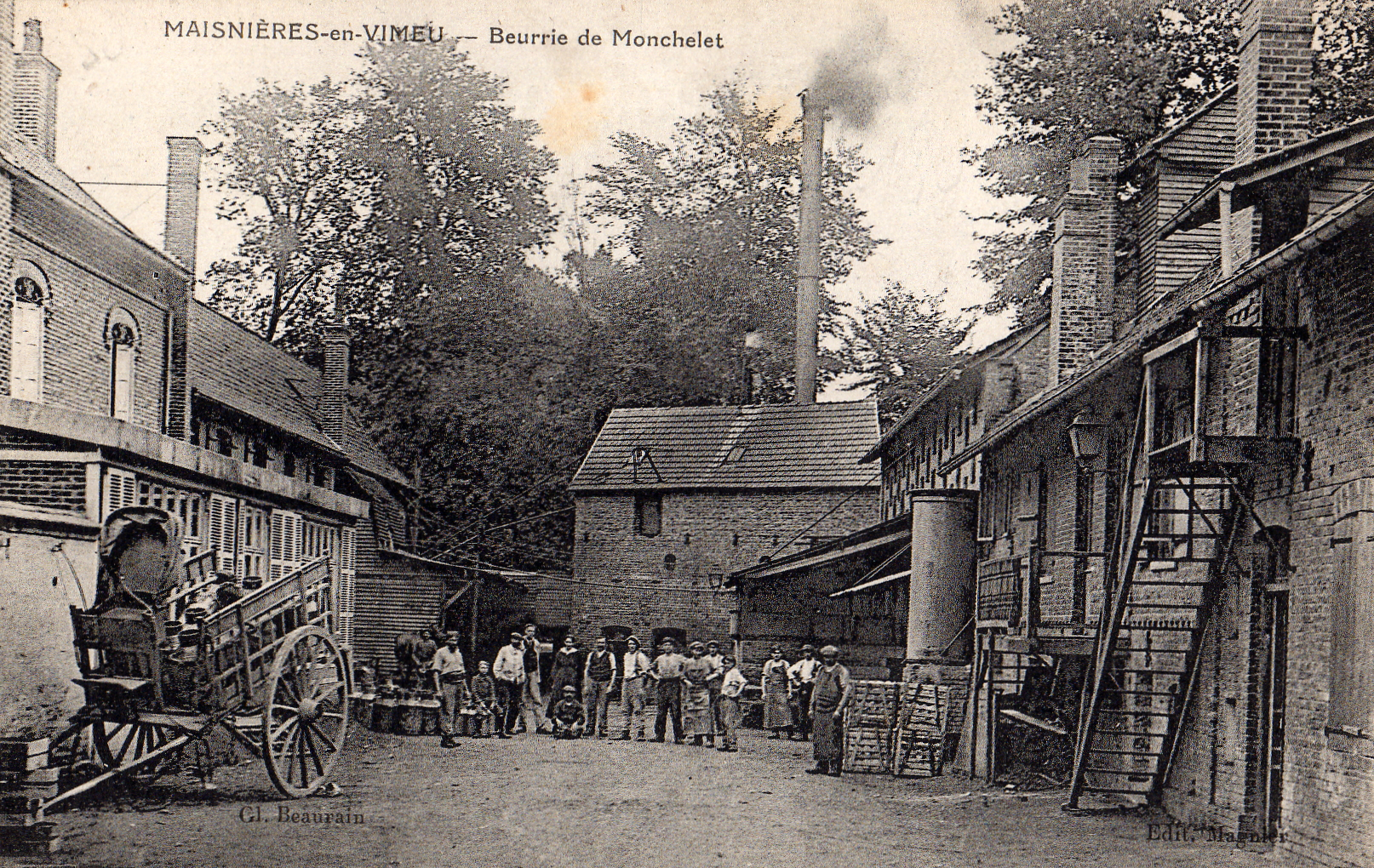
The dairy before 1914

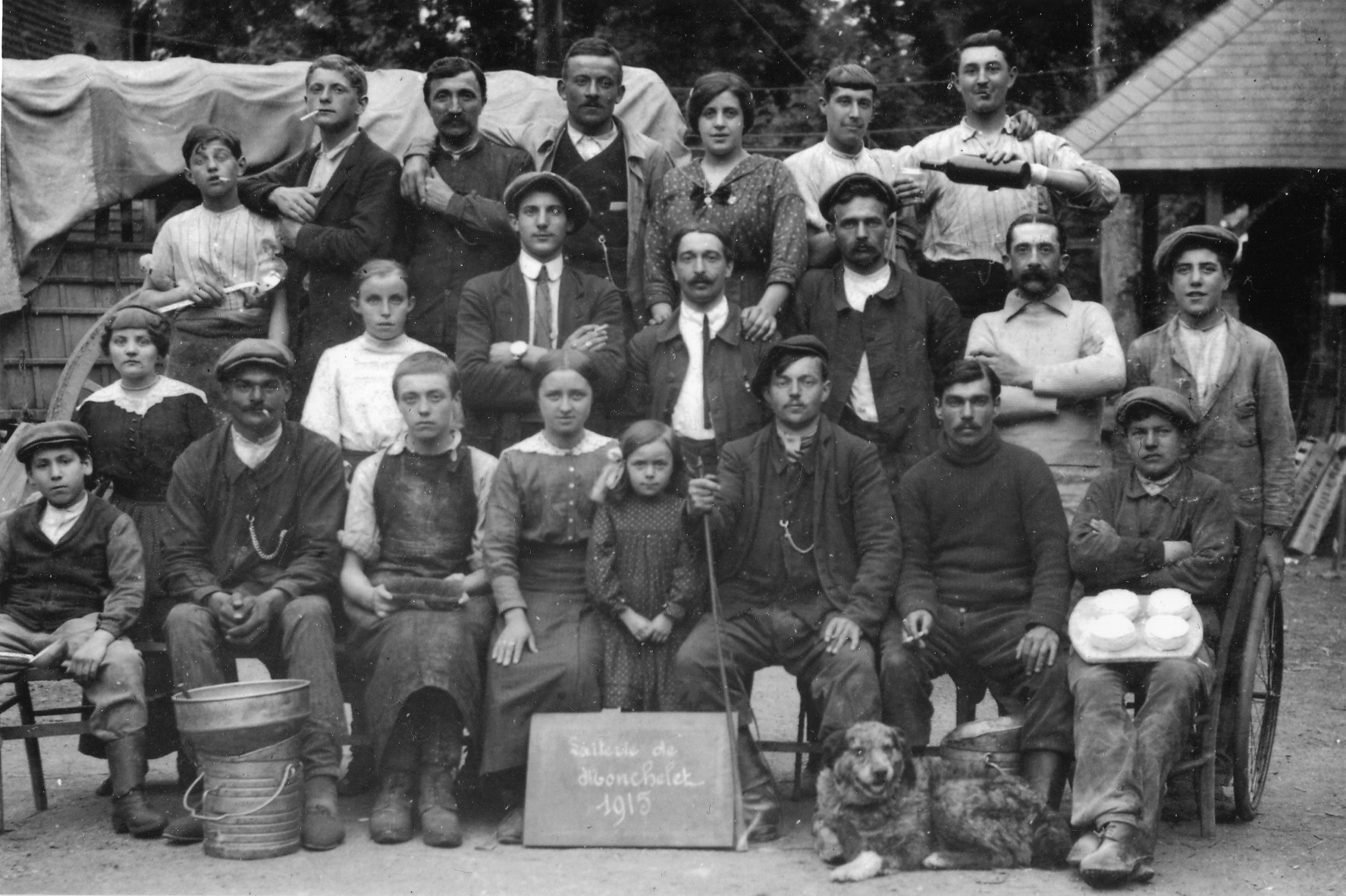
21 employees and a child in 1915

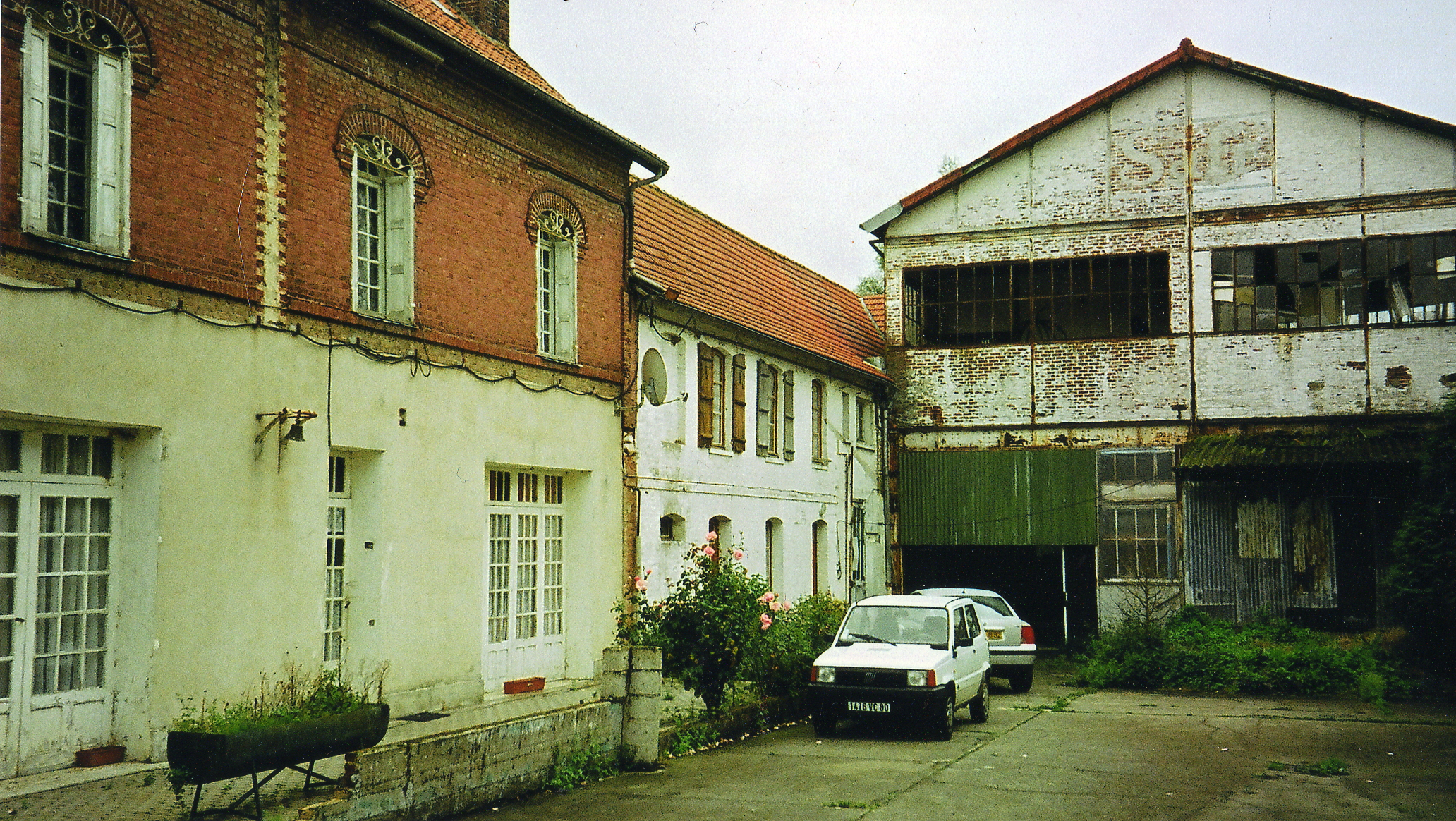
The dairy and cheese factory 2006

== See also ==
- Communes of the Somme department
