= SNCF Class X 4630 =

Class of 115 French 2-car diesel multiple units

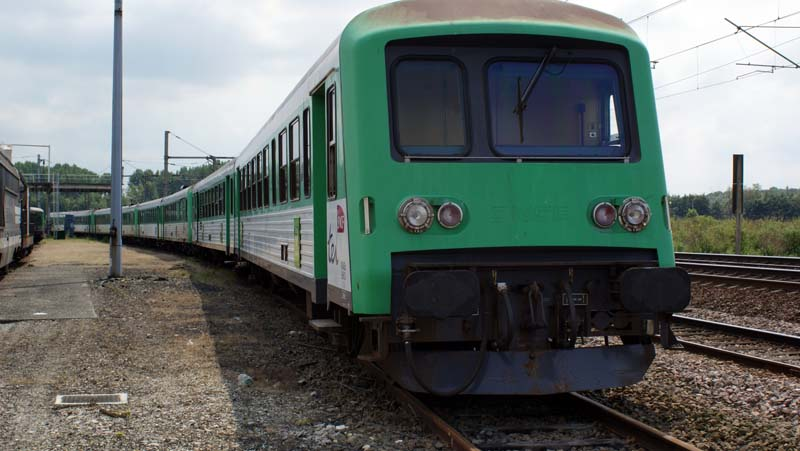
X 4630 unit at Longueau station.

The SNCF Class X 4630 are diesel multiple units that were built by ANF in 1974–78 and equipped with Saurer engines. The last units were all withdrawn from service in July 2011 and replaced definitively by X 73500, X 76500 and B 81500.
