= Le Tréport–Mers station =

French railway station

Le Tréport–Mers
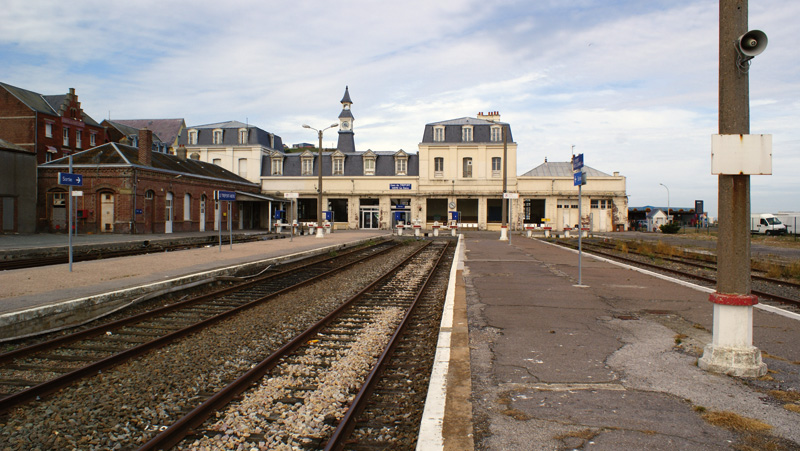
- View of the station from the platform

General information
- Location: Place Pierre Sémard; Le Tréport
- Coordinates: 50°3′47″N 1°22′40″E
- Owner: RFF/SNCF
- Line: Épinay-Villetaneuse–Le Tréport-Mers railway
- Platforms: 2
- Tracks: 3

Other information
- Station code: 87317529

History
- Opened: 1872

Services
Preceding station	TER Hauts-de-France	Following station
Eu towards Beauvais	Proxi P30	Terminus
Location

The Le Tréport–Mers station (French pronunciation: [lə tʁepɔʁ mɛʁs]) is a railway station in the commune of Le Tréport in the Seine-Maritime department, France. It is only a few metres from Mers-les-Bains, which is in the Somme department.

== Railway service ==
The Gare du Tréport-Mers is the terminus of the Paris–Beauvais–Abancourt–Le Tréport-Mers and the Abbeville–Le Tréport-Mers lines.

The station is served by ATER X 73500, XGC X 76500 and on occasions modernised X 4630 rollingstock. Every Sunday it is also served by a Corail train connecting it to Paris Gare du Nord. Train services to Abbeville were discontinued in 2018.

During the high season (from mid-June to the beginning of September), express TER Normandie trains run from Rouen on weekends and bank holidays and TER Hauts-de-France trains run from Laon and Amiens on Sundays and bank holidays.

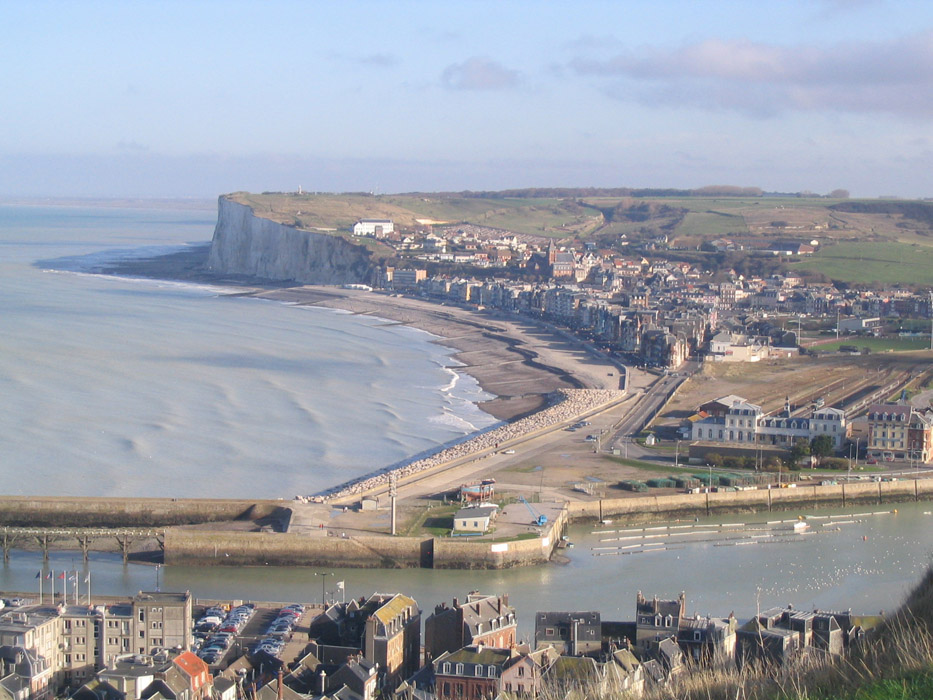
Aerial view showing station, right centre, between Le Tréport and Mers-les-Bains

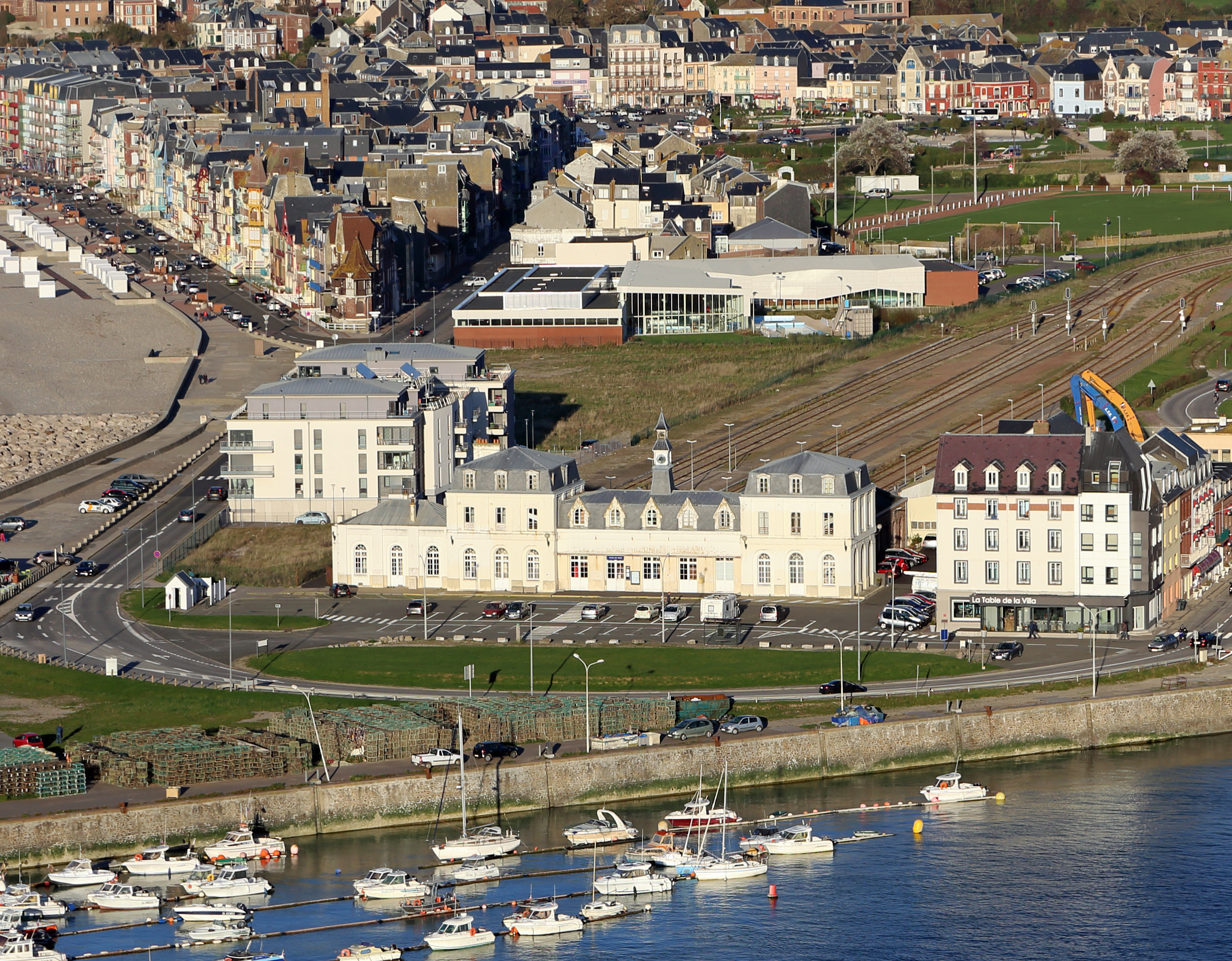
The station, seen from Le Tréport

== History ==
The station was built in 1872 in classical style for the Compagnie des Chemins de fer du Nord (Nord company) and opened on 11 May 1872 with the section of line to Longroy-Gamaches. In 1873 the line was extended to Abancourt, permitting the company to run "seaside trains" from Paris via Amiens.

The station was renamed Gare du Tréport-Mers in 1887 after the Syndicate of Property Owners of Mers petitioned for Mers to be mentioned on signs and posters.

Until 2 October 1938, Le Tréport-Mers was also connected to Dieppe by the Eu – Dieppe line; part of this closed line, between Saint-Quentin-au-Bosc and Eu, has since become a footpath, the chemin vert du Petit Caux (Petit Caux greenway).

== The station ==
The station is a terminus but architecturally resembles the large main-line stations of the Nord company's network, with two corner pavilions. The semi-circular arched windows on the ground floor and mansard roofs with dormer windows lend it the appearance of a bourgeois residence. The clock identifies it as a station and echoes the seaside style that corresponds to the environment of Mers. Originally the walls of the building were not plastered but made up of bare brickwork, as in the majority of Le Tréport buildings. The station therefore represented the contrasting identities of the two towns which it served.

The station building is open daily and has a ticket office and ticket machines.
