= Beauvais station =

French railway station

Beauvais
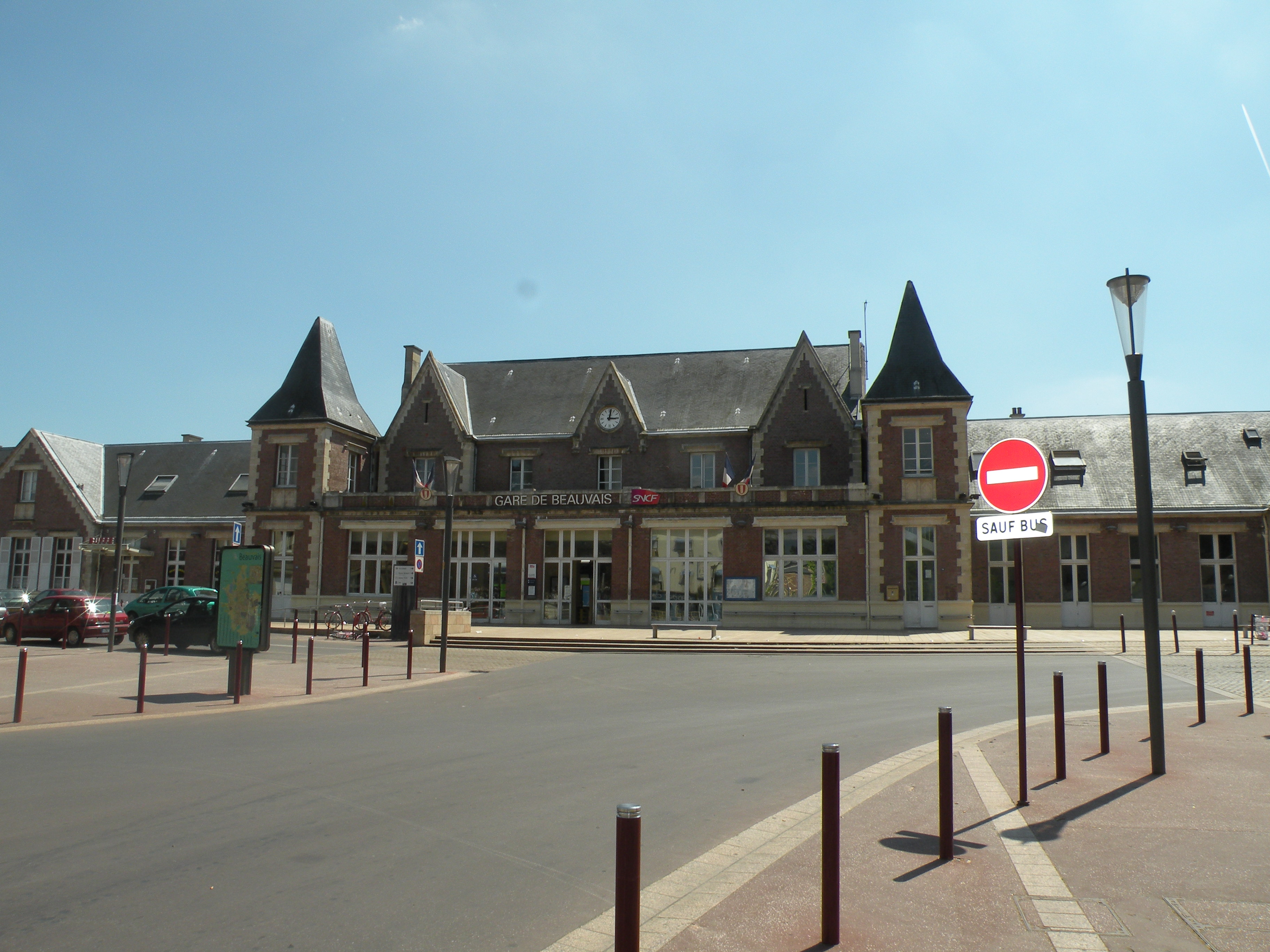

General information
- Location: near Beauvais, France
- Coordinates: 49.4264°N 2.0888°E
- Owner: SNCF
- Lines: Épinay-Villetaneuse–Le Tréport-Mers railway, Creil–Beauvais railway

Other information
- Station code: 87313510

History
- Opened: 1857

Passengers
- 2024: 2,122,526

Services
Preceding station	TER Hauts-de-France	Following station
Saint-Sulpice–Auteuil towards Paris-Nord	Citi C17	Terminus
Terminus	Proxi P30	Herchies towards Le Tréport-Mers
Terminus	Proxi P32	Rochy-Condé towards Creil
Location

Beauvais is a railway station located in Beauvais in the Oise department, France. TER Hauts-de-France trains connect the station to Le Tréport-Mers, Creil and Paris-Nord. The Neo-medieval station building was constructed by Compagnie du Nord in brick and concrete in 1860. The line to Paris is electrified with an alternating current running 25 kV-50 Hz. Other lines run on diesel.

== History ==
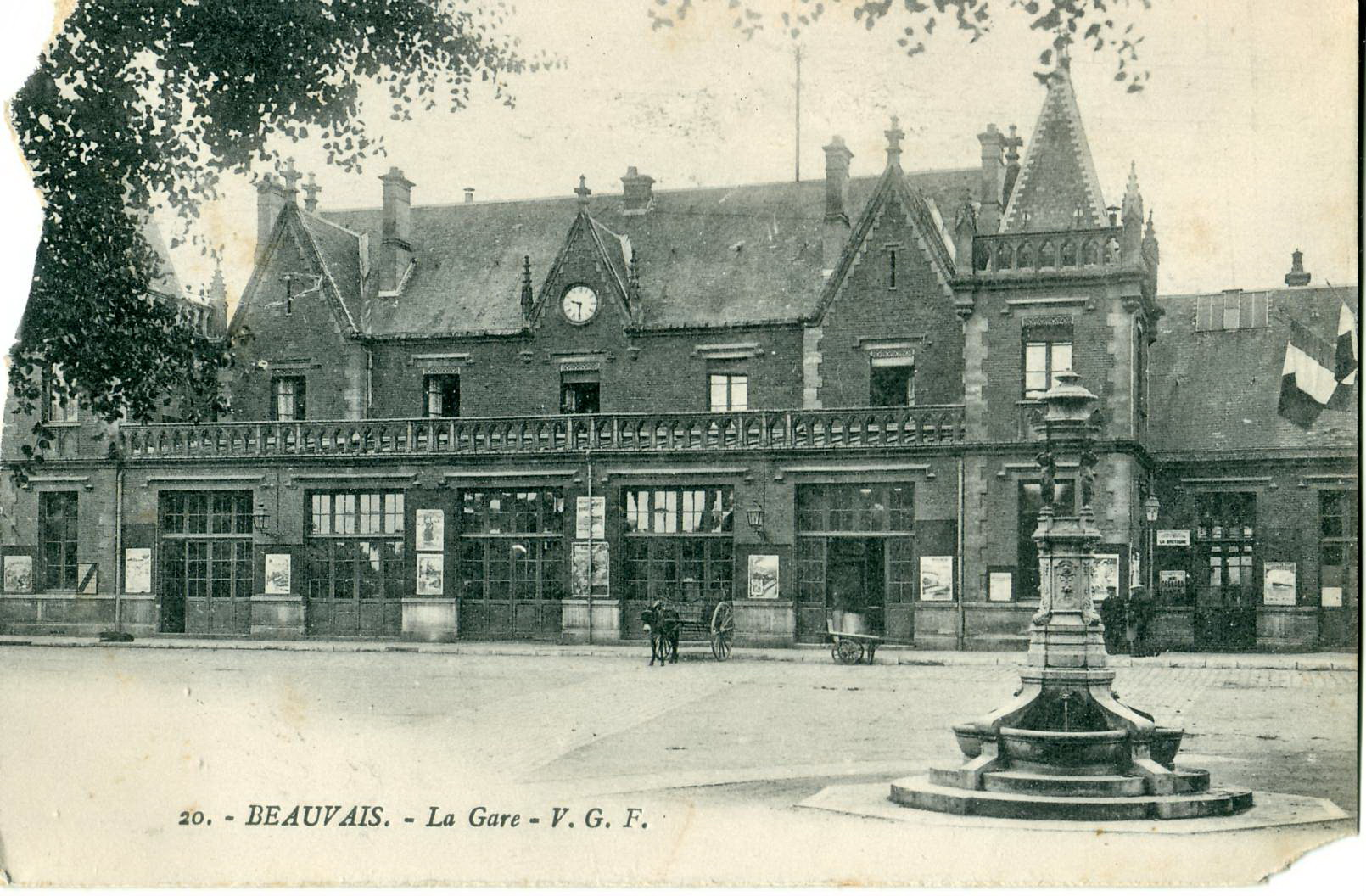
The station in the early 20th century

A station was opened at Beauvais in 1857, when the line Beauvais - Creil was opened. At the time, it took three and a half hours to reach Paris via Creil. The direct line from Paris to Beauvais and further to Le Tréport was opened in 1877. Until 1939, Beauvais was also connected by rail with Gournay-Ferrières, Gisors, Clermont, Saint-Just-en-Chaussée and Amiens (via the Beauvais-Amiens railway).

== See also ==
- List of SNCF stations in Hauts-de-France
