= André Masson =

French painter

- André Masson
- Born: André-Aimé-René Masson; 4 January 1896; Balagny-sur-Thérain, Oise, France
- Died: 28 October 1987 (aged 91); Paris, France
- Known for: Painting
- Movement: Surrealism
- Children: 3, including Diego Masson

André Masson.Pedestal Table in the Studio (1922)

André Masson. Automatic Drawing (1924). Ink on paper, 9 1/4 × 8 1/8" (23.5 × 20.6 cm). Museum of Modern Art, New York.

André-Aimé-René Masson (French: [ɑ̃dʁe ɛme ʁəne masɔ̃]; 4 January 1896 – 28 October 1987) was a French artist. He was a leading figure in the Surrealist movement and an influence on Abstract Expressionism. He served in the French Army from 1914 to 1915, when he was discharged due to injuries sustained in battle. During his exile in the United States during World War II, his work influenced the development of the New York School, where he influenced young American artists, most notably Jackson Pollock and Arshile Gorky.

== Biography ==
Masson was born in Balagny-sur-Thérain, Oise, a town north of Paris. when he was eight his father's work took the family first briefly to Lille and then to Brussels. He began his study of art at the age of eleven at the Académie Royale des Beaux-Arts in Brussels, under the guidance of Constant Montald, and later he studied in Paris. He fought for France during World War I and was seriously injured. Masson shared a Paris studio with Joan Miró.

== Artistic works ==
He began painting during his recuperation in Céret, France after World War I. His early works display an interest in cubism, producing landscapes of forests with formations suggestive of crypts and graves. In 1920 he married Odette Cabalé and they moved to Paris where they had a daughter, Lily (née Gladys) Masson. In the early 1920s, Masson experimented with altered states of consciousness with artists such as Antonin Artaud, Michel Leiris, Joan Miró, Georges Bataille, Jean Dubuffet and Georges Malkine, who gathered regularly at his studio, which he shared with Joan Miró. Leiris, Artaud and Masson joined the Surrealists led by André Breton in 1924 and he was one of the most enthusiastic practitioners of automatic drawing, making a number of automatic works in pen and ink.

From around 1926, he attempted to develop automatism in painting. He experimented by pouring glue onto canvas, then adhering sand to the wet surfaces, adding painted areas inspired by the sandy shapes that were formed at random. By the end of the 1920s, however, he found Andre Breton's insistence on the Surrealists' allegiance to the Parti communiste français stifling, and he left the surrealist movement, turning to a more structured figurative style, often producing works with violent or erotic themes. He joined other "dissident Surrealists" who had left the group, loosely formed around his close friends Michel Leiris and Georges Bataille. From 1930 to 1933 Masson was in a relationship with Paule Vézelay, a British abstract artist living in Paris, whose work also inspired him. In 1934 he met and married Rose Maklés, the sister of Sylvia Bataille who was married to Georges Bataille (she would later marry Jacques Lacan). The Massons moved to Spain to escape the violence that culminated in the February 6, 1934 riots in Paris. In Catalonia, a hike that left them stranded on the mountain of Montserrat overnight prompted a flashback to his wartime experience of being shelled and wounded. He went on to produce a number of paintings inspired by the mountain experience. Masson settled in Tossa de Mar, a small fishing village on the Costa Brava, where they had two sons (Diego and Luis. The family returned to France just prior to the outbreak of the Spanish Civil War, which is reflected in a number of his paintings and anti-fascist drawings. He briefly reconciled with André Breton and the Surrealists at the end of the 1930s, producing paintings of violent hybrids featuring figures and furnishings, inspired by the concept of metamorphosis.

Under the German occupation of France during World War II, his work was condemned by the Nazis as degenerate. With the assistance of Varian Fry in Marseille, Masson escaped the Nazi regime on a ship to the French island of Martinique from where he went on to the United States. Upon arrival in New York City customs officials inspecting Masson's luggage found a cache of his erotic drawings. Living in New Preston, Connecticut, his work became an important influence on American abstract expressionists, such as Jackson Pollock. Following the war, he returned to France and settled in Aix-en-Provence where he painted a number of landscapes.

Masson drew the cover of the first issue of Georges Bataille's review, Acéphale, in 1936, and produced the images for all its issues until 1939. His brother-in-law, the psychoanalyst Jacques Lacan, was the last private owner of Gustave Courbet's provocative painting L'Origine du monde (The Origin of the World); Lacan asked Masson to paint a surrealist variant.

== Family ==
His son, Diego Masson (born 1935), is a conductor, composer, and percussionist, while another son, Luis Masson, is an actor. His daughter, Lily Masson (1920–2019), was a painter.

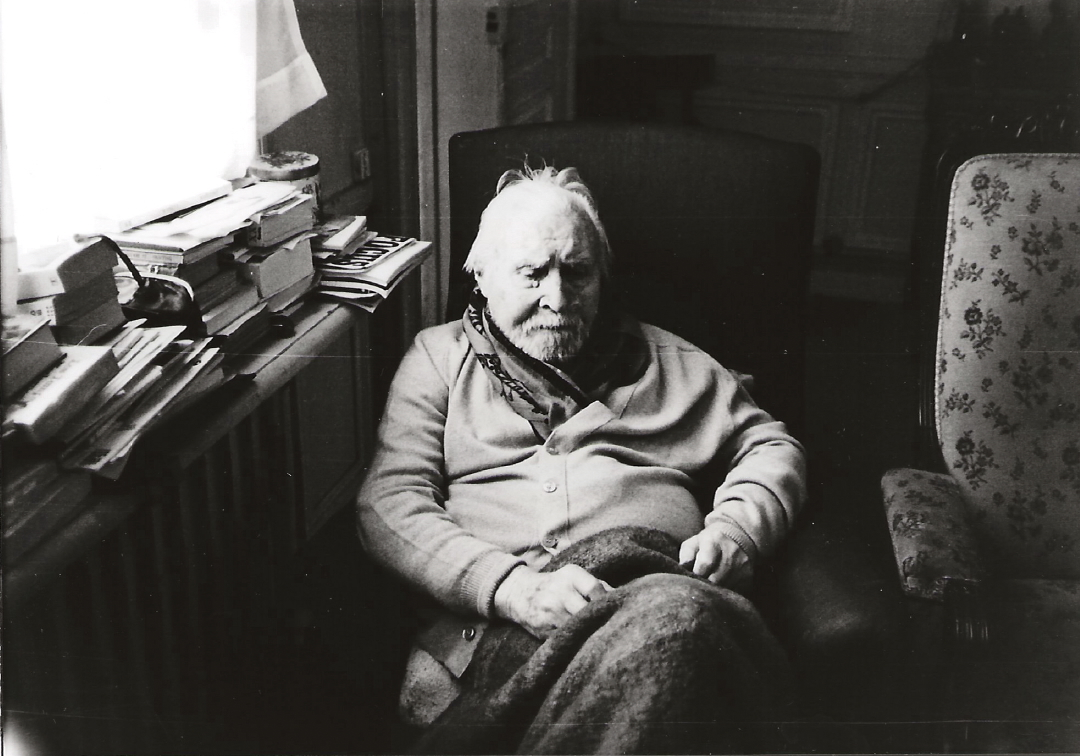
André Masson, Paris, September 1984. Photo by John Oakes.

== Bibliography ==
- André Breton. Le Surréalisme et la Peinture. Paris: Gallimard/NRF, 1928 (French).
  - 2nd, expanded edition: New York/Buenos Aires: Brentano's, 1945 (French).
  - New, revised and vastly expanded edition: Paris: Gallimard, 1965, reprinted 1979 (French).
  - English edition: Surrealism and Painting. London: MacDonald, 1972. ISBN 0-356-02423-7. Translated by Simon Watson-Taylor.
- Robert Desnos and Armand Salacrou (eds.). André Masson. Self-published, 1940. Anthology in limited edition, each copy initialed by André Masson. Texts by Jean-Louis Barrault, Georges Bataille, André Breton, Robert Desnos, Paul Éluard, Armel Guerne, Pierre Jean Jouve, Madeleine Landsberg, Michel Leiris, Georges Limbour, Benjamin Péret (French). Reprinted 1993 by Éditions André Dimanche, in Marseille.
- André Breton and André Masson: Martinique. Charmeuse de serpents. Paris: Sagittaire, 1947. Reprinted by Jean-Jacques Pauvert, Paris, in 1972.
  - English edition: Martinique: Snake Charmer. "Surrealist Revolution Series". Austin: University of Texas Press, 2008. ISBN 0-292-71765-2. Translated by David W. Seaman.
- Georges Limbour and Michel Leiris. André Masson et son univers. Geneva: Les Trois Collines, 1947 (French). Includes poem "André Masson" by Leiris, and Masson's portrait of Breton and a self-portrait.
  - English edition: André Masson and His Universe. London: Horizon, 1947. OCLC 561660506 a. o. Same edition with supplemented partly translations by Douglas Cooper.
- Georges Limbour André Masson: dessins. Collection "Plastique". Paris: Éditions Braun, 1951 (French).
- André Masson. Entretiens avec Georges Charbonnier, préface de Georges Limbour. Paris: René Julliard, 1958 (French). Reprinted 1995 by Éditions André Dimanche, Marseille.
- André Masson. "Dissonances". In: X magazine, Vol. I, No. III (June 1960). Reprinted in: David Wright (ed.): An Anthology from X. Oxford and New York: Oxford University Press, 1988. ISBN 0-19-212266-5.
- Daniel Guérin. Eux et lui: suivi de commentaires, et orné de cinq dessins originaux par André Masson. Monaco: Éditions du Rocher, 1962. OCLC 25887616 (French). Reprinted Lille: GKC (Question de genre), 2000.
- Hubert Juin. André Masson. Paris: Le musée de poche, 1963 (French).
- Gilbert Brownstone. André Masson. Milano: Galleria Schwarz, 1970 (English).
- José Pierre. Surrealism. "History of Art". London: Heron Books, 1970. ISBN 0-900948-72-8.
- José Pierre. Surrealist Painting, 1919–1939/1940–1970. "The Little Library of Art" 102 &103. London and New York: Methuen and Tudor, 1971.
- Jean-Claude Clébert, Mythologie d'André Masson. Genève: Éditions Pierre Cailler, 1971 (French).
- Françoise Levaillant (as Françoise Will-Levaillant). André Masson, période asiatique 1950–1959. Paris: Galerie de Seine, 1972 (French).
- André Masson. La Mémoire du monde. Geneva: Skira, 1974 (conversations with Gaétan Picon). (French)
- Gilbert Brownstone. André Masson: vagabond du surréalisme. Paris: Éditions Saint-Germain-des-Prés, 1975. ISBN 2-243-00081-4 (French). Interviews.
- René Passeron. André Masson et les puissances de signe. Paris: Denoël, 1975 (French).
- Françoise Levaillant (ed.). André Masson. Le Rebelle du Surréalisme. Paris: Éditions Hermann, 1976. Reprinted 1994 (French).
- Jean-Clarence Lambert. André Masson. Paris: Éditions Filipacchi, 1979 (French).
- Carmine Benincasa. André Masson, 1941–1945: Water, Air, Earth, Fire. New York: Marisa del Re Gallery, 1981 (French).
- Françoise Levaillant. L'oeuvre d'André Masson: essais sur l'art et les savoirs dans la première moitié du XXe siècle. Paris: Université de Paris I, Panthéon-Sorbonne, 1986 (French). Ph.D. (doctoral thesis supervisor René Jullian).
- Françoise Levaillant (ed.). André Masson: les années surréalistes. Correspondance 1916–1942. Lyon: La Manufacture, 1990 (French).
- Florence de Mèredieu. André Masson: les dessins automatiques. Paris: Blusson, 1988. OCLC 603947158 (French).
- Bernard Noël. André Masson, la chair du regard. Collection L'art et l'écrivain. Paris: Gallimard, 1993. ISBN 2-07-011258-6 (French).
- Dawn Adès. André Masson. London: Academy Editions, 2004. ISBN 1-85490-314-4.
- Kai Buchholz and Klaus Wolbert (eds.). André Masson. Bilder aus dem Labyrinth der Seele. Exhibition catalogue, Darmstadt/Frankfurt a. M.: Institut Mathildenhöhe, 2003. ISBN 3-925782-43-5 (German).
- Armel Guerne. André Masson ou les autres valeurs. Roy (Belgique): Les Amis d'Armel Guerne, 2007. OCLC 798378983 (French).
- Clark V. Poling. André Masson and the Surrealist Self. New Haven: Yale University Press, 2008. ISBN 0-300-13562-9.
- André Masson. Catalogue raisonné de l'œuvre peint, 1919–1941. Vaumarcus: Éditions ArtAcatos, 2010. Catalogue by Guite Masson, Martin Masson, and Catherine Loewer, preface by Bernard Noël, text by Dawn Adès, biography by Camille Morando. ISBN 2-940452-00-8 (French).
- Hélène Parant, Fabrice Flahutez, and Camille Morando. La bibliothèque d'André Masson. Une archéologie. Paris: Artvenir, 2011. ISBN 2-9539406-0-X (French).
