= Balagny–Saint-Épin station =

French railway station

Balagny–Saint-Épin
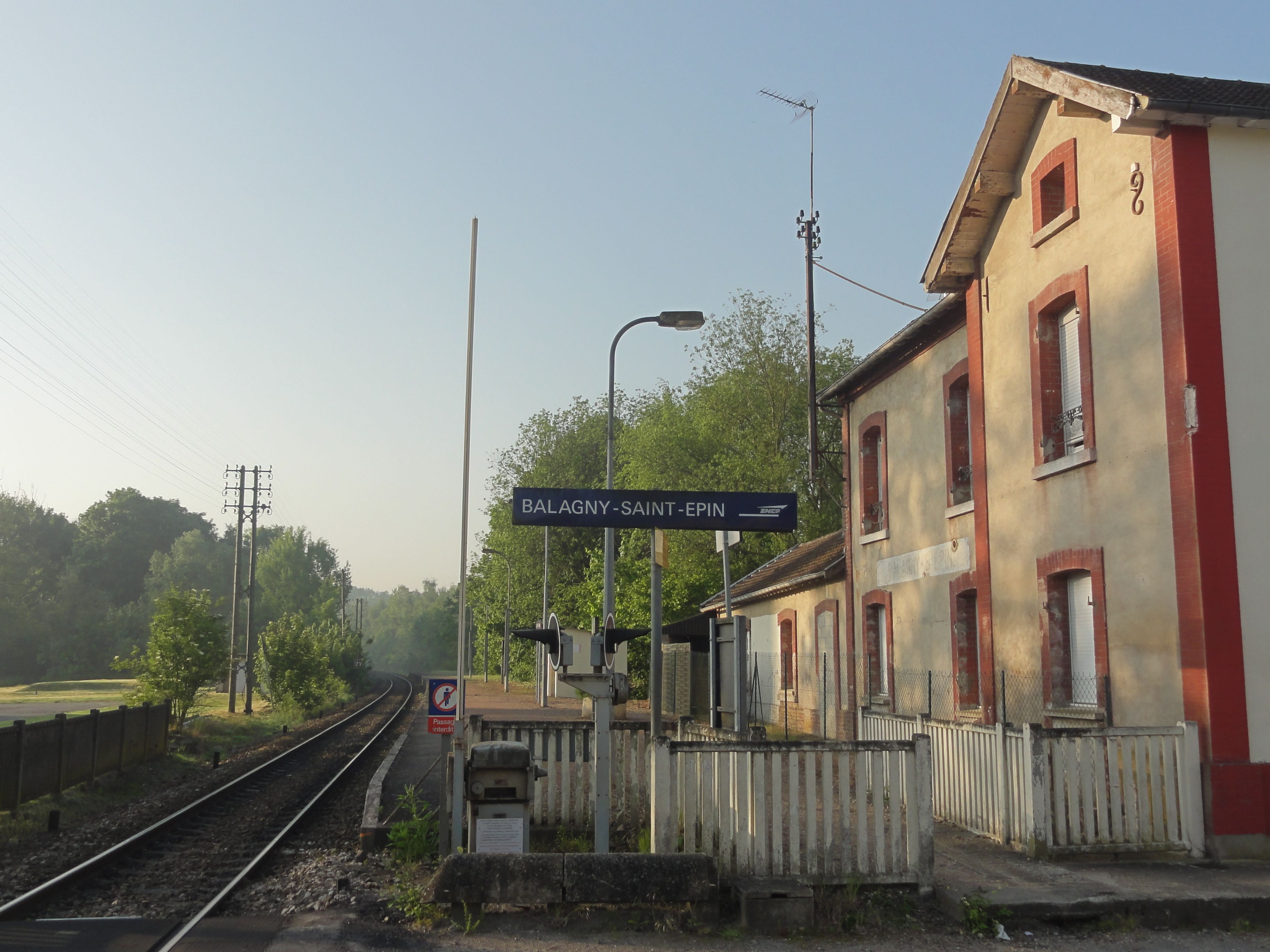
- train station

General information
- Location: Balagny-sur-Thérain
- Coordinates: 49°17′39″N 2°20′39″E
- Owner: RFF/SNCF
- Line: Creil–Beauvais railway

Other information
- Station code: 87313569

History
- Opened: 1857

Services
Preceding station	TER Hauts-de-France	Following station
Mouy–Bury towards Beauvais	Proxi P32	Cires-lès-Mello towards Creil
Location

Balagny–Saint-Épin is a railway station located in the commune of Balagny-sur-Thérain in the Oise department, France. It is also located near the settlement of Saint-Épin in the commune of Bury. The station is served by TER Hauts-de-France trains (Beauvais - Creil line).

== See also ==
- List of SNCF stations in Hauts-de-France
