= David Pagel =

American art critic

- Education: Stanford University (BA); Harvard University (MA)
- Occupations: Art critic; educator; curator
- Employer: Claremont Graduate University
- Awards: Andrew W. Mellon Fellowship in Contemporary Arts Criticism (1990); Macgeorge Fellowship, University of Melbourne (2002)

David Pagel is an American art critic, educator, and curator.

== Contemporary art criticism ==
Since 1991, Pagel has been a regular contributor to the Los Angeles Times. He is a professor of art theory and history at Claremont Graduate University, where he has taught in the art department since 1994. He is also an adjunct curator at the Parrish Art Museum in Water Mill, New York.

Pagel has written numerous essays for exhibition catalogs by such artists as Jim Isermann, Rodney Carswell, Roy Dowell, David Klamen, Michael Reafsnyder, Robert Zakanitch, Tim Bavington, Sush Machida, Leslie Love Stone, Ron Nagle, Elizabeth Patterson, Asad Faulwell, Wendell Gladstone, and Irene Hardwicke Olivieri.

He was the recipient of an Andrew W. Mellon Fellowship in Contemporary Arts Criticism in 1990 and was a Macgeorge Fellow at the University of Melbourne in Australia in 2002.

== Curatorial activities ==
- 2008, 2009: Damaged Romanticism: A Mirror of Modern Emotion (with Terrie Sultan) for the Blaffer Gallery at the University of Houston and the Grey Art Gallery at New York University
- 2009: Electric Mud at the Blaffer
- 2005: POPulence at Blaffer Gallery, University of Houston
- 2007: 702 Series: Sush Machida Gaikotsu at Las Vegas Art Museum
- 2007: Painting Design at Claremont Graduate University
- 2009: LA Now at the Las Vegas Art Museum
- 2010: Underground Pop at the Parrish Art Museum
- 2011: Pieceable Kingdom at the Beacon Arts Building
- 2016: Unfinished Business at the Parrish Art Museum

== Education ==
- B.A., Stanford University, Modern Thought and Literature, with Honors and Distinction in the Humanities, 1985
- M.A., Harvard University, Art History, 1987

== Bibliography ==
- Darren Waterston: Representing The Invisible by Dave Hickey, David Pagel
- Irene Hardwicke Olivieri: Paintings by David Pagel
- Plane/Structures by David Pagel
- Fifteen: A Fifteen-Year Survey of Jim Isermann's Work by David Pagel
- The Smiths (Seton Smith, Kiki Smith and Tony Smith) by Gilbert Brownstone, Eleanor Heartney and David Pagel
- Postmark: An Abstract Effect by Louis Grachos and David Pagel
- The Cowboys Stadium: Art + Architecture by David Dillon and David Pagel
