= Mouy–Bury station =

Railway station in Bury, France

Mouy–Bury
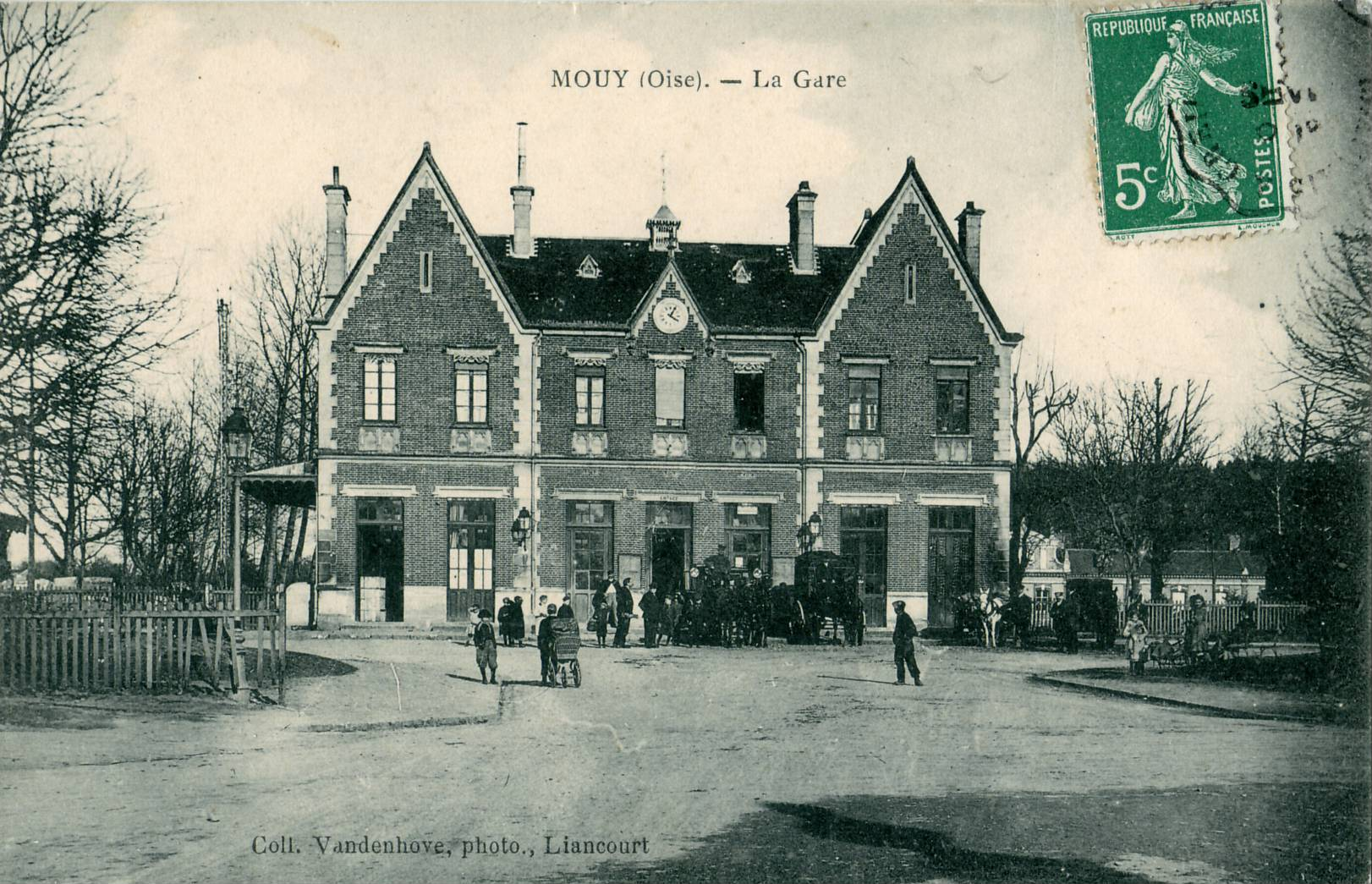
- The station in the early 20th century

General information
- Location: Place Pierre Semard, 60250 Mouy
- Coordinates: 49°19′14″N 2°19′35″E
- Owner: RFF/SNCF
- Line: Creil–Beauvais railway

Other information
- Station code: 87313577

Services
Preceding station	TER Hauts-de-France	Following station
Heilles–Mouchy towards Beauvais	Proxi P32	Balagny–Saint-Épin towards Creil
Location

Mouy-Bury is a railway station located in the communes of Angy and Mouy near Bury in the Oise department, France. The station is served by TER Hauts-de-France trains from Creil to Beauvais.
