= Villers-Saint-Sépulcre station =

French train station

Villers-Saint-Sépulcre
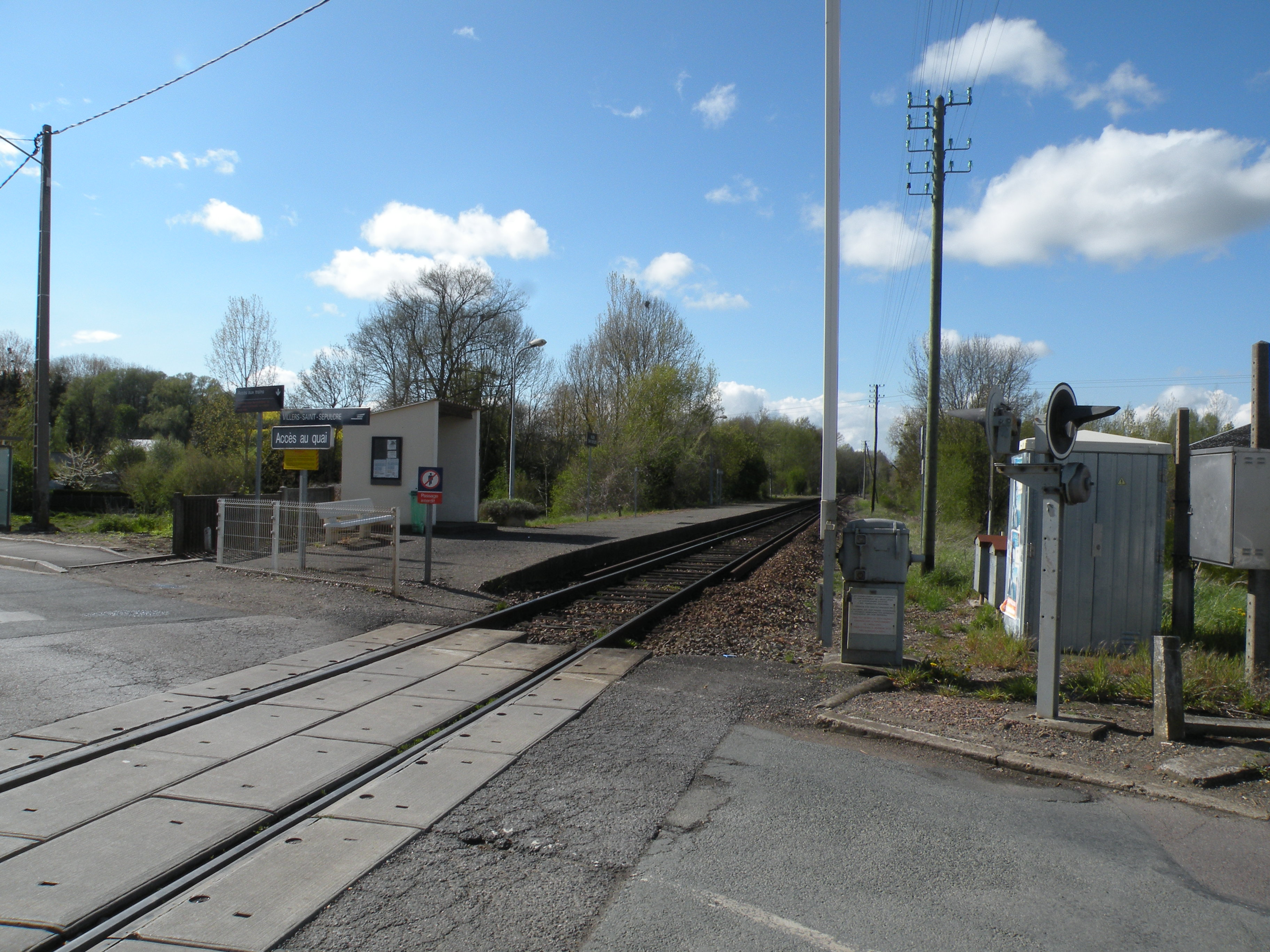
- Station platform

General information
- Location: Rue de la Gare; Villers-Saint-Sépulcre
- Coordinates: 49°22′4″N 2°13′15″E
- Owner: RFF/SNCF
- Line: Creil–Beauvais railway

Other information
- Station code: 87313593

Services
Preceding station	TER Hauts-de-France	Following station
Montreuil-sur-Thérain towards Beauvais	Proxi P32	Hermes–Berthecourt towards Creil
Location

Villers-Saint-Sépulcre is a railway station located in the commune of Villers-Saint-Sépulcre in the Oise department, France. The station is served by TER Hauts-de-France trains from Creil to Beauvais.
