= Carmine Benincasa =

Italian art critic and professor (1947–2020)

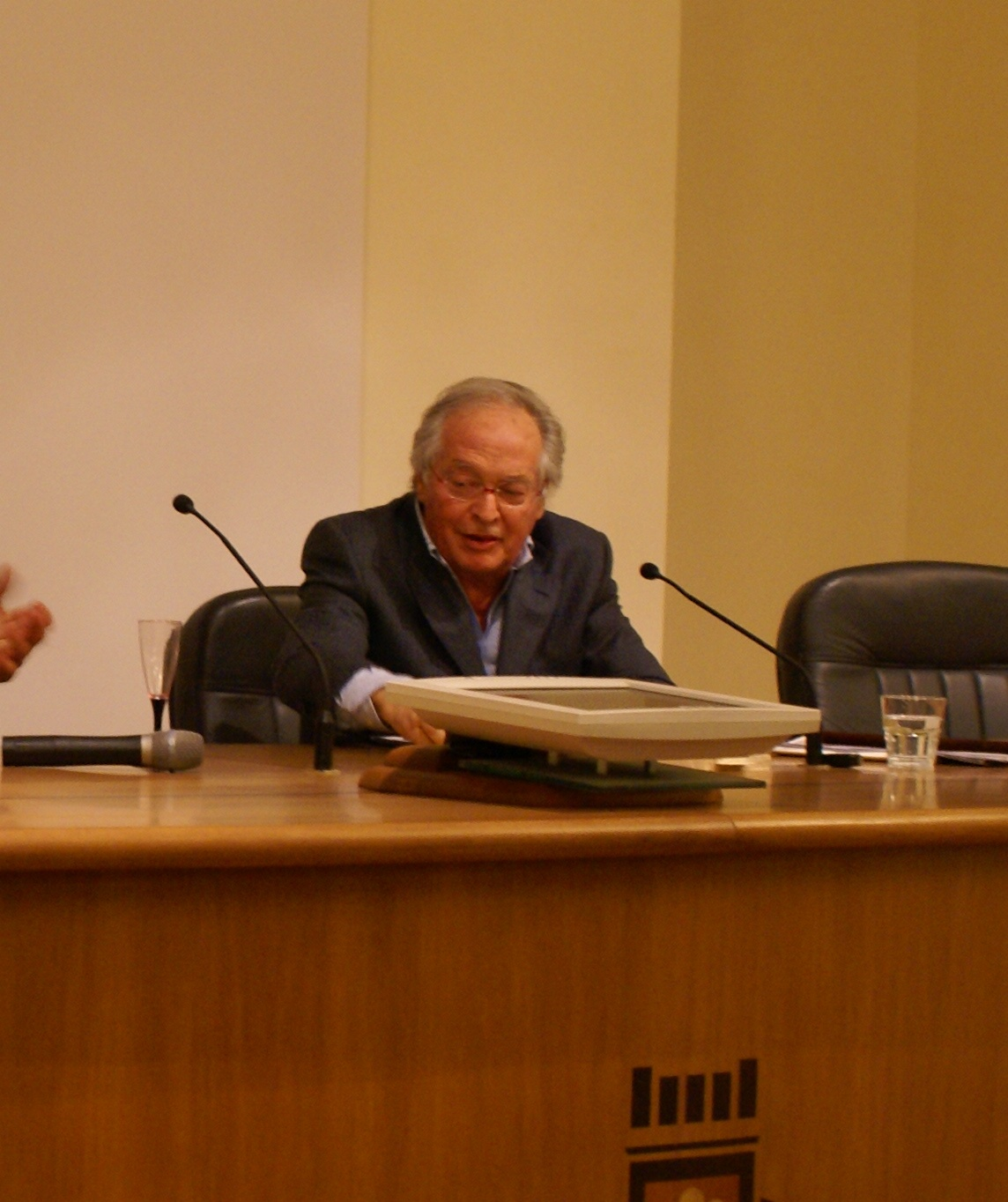
- Born: 17 December 1947; Eboli, Italy
- Died: 3 August 2020 (aged 72); Rome, Italy
- Education: University of Rome
- Occupations: Art critic, author, journalist
- Title: Professor

Carmine Benincasa (17 December 1947 – 3 August 2020) was an Italian art critic and art historian professor.

== Biography ==
Benincasa was born in Eboli in the south of Italy. After studying in a religious school he moved to Rome to study theology, philosophy and law.

He was a professor of art history at the Accademia di Belle Arti di Macerata, the Academy of Fine Arts in Florence and Professor of History of Art at the Faculty of Architecture of the University La Sapienza in Rome. During this period he met intellectuals like Jean-Paul Sartre, Jorge Luis Borges, Marguerite Yourcenar, Bruno Zevi and many more.

From 1978 to 1982 he was a member of the Venice Biennale Visual Arts Committee and an advisor to the Ministry of Culture and Environment. In 1994 he was briefly accused and incarcerated for defrauding collectors by validating and selling false artworks. The case was subsequently thrown out of court for lack of evidence. Benincasa was eventually cleared of every wrongdoing by the Supreme Court of Italy in 2014.

Benincasa published numerous essays, articles and monographs on artists such as Paul Klee, Antoni Tàpies, Renato Guttuso, Henry Moore, Mario Ceroli, Willem de Kooning, Joan Miró, Amedeo Modigliani, Giacomo Balla, Wassily Kandinsky, Henri Matisse and Giorgio Morandi. He also organized many international exhibitions, including a section of the Venice Biennale in 1982.

He died on 3 August 2020, aged 72.

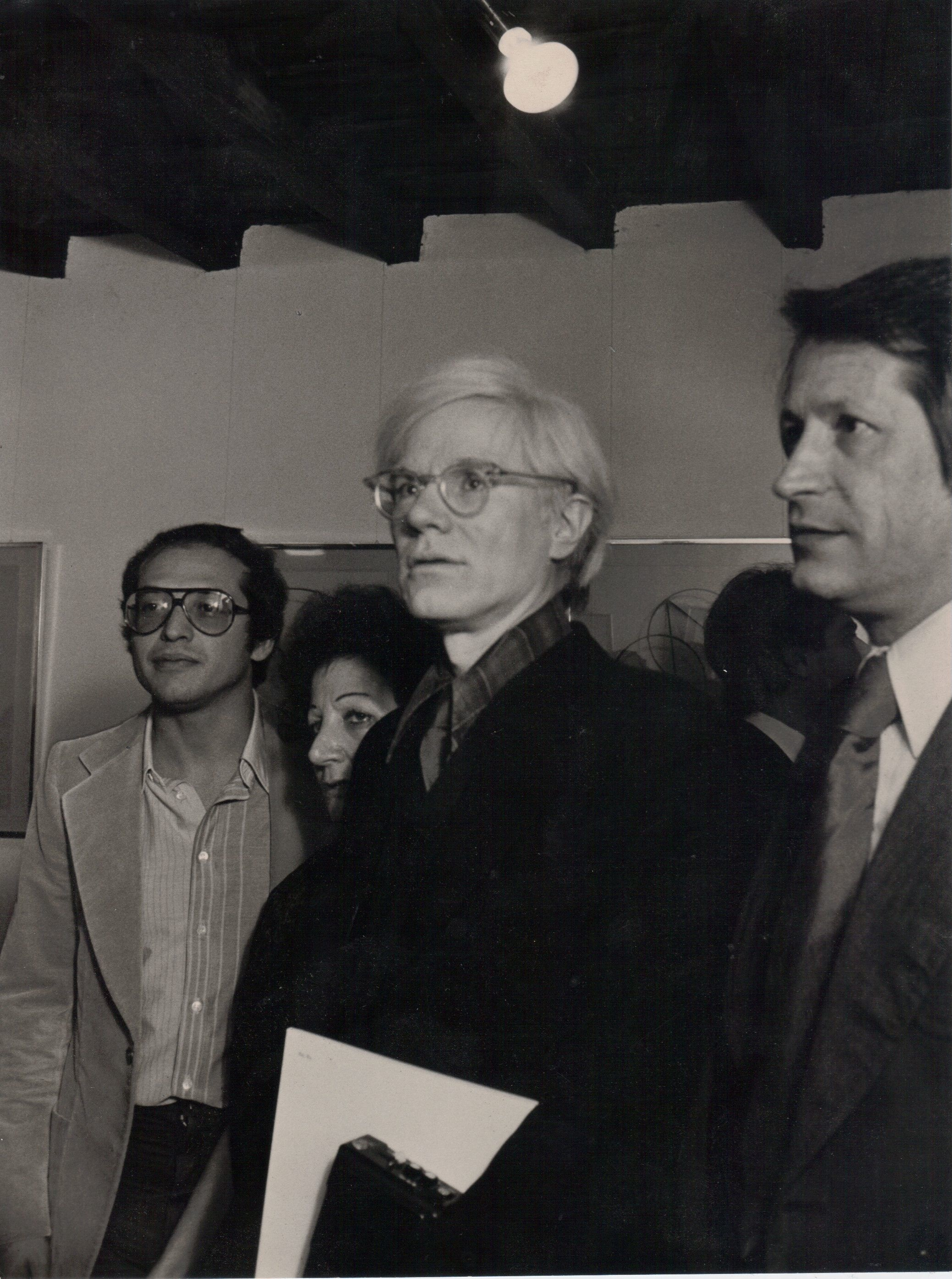
Andy Warhol with prof Benincasa (left), Rome, c. 1980

== Selected works ==
- Chiesa e storia del cardinale Emmanuel Célestin Suhard e il Concilio Vaticano II – Ed. Paoline, 1967
- L’interpretazione tra futuro e utopia – Ed. Magma, Roma 1973
- Sul manierismo – Come dentro uno specchio, La Nuova Foglio Editrice 1975; 2° ed – Ed. Officina, Roma
- Babilonia in fiamme – Saggi sull’arte contemporanea – Ed. Electa, Milano 1978
- Architettura come dis-identità – Ed. Dedalo, Bari 1978
- L’altra scena – Saggi sul pensiero antico, medioevale e controrinascimentale – Ed. Dedalo, 1979
- Anabasi – Architettura e arte 1960/1980 – Ed. Dedalo, Bari 1980
- Joan Miró – Ed. 2C, Roma 1981
- Oskar Kokoschka - La mia vita – Ed. Marsilio, Venezia 1981
- Georges Braque – Opere dal 1900 al 1963 – Ed. Marsilio, Venezia 1982
- Verso l’altrove – Fogli eretici sull’arte contemporanea – Ed. Electa, Milano 1983
- Alvar Aalto – Ed. Leader, 1983
- Paul Klee – Ed. Marisa del Re Gallery, 1983
- Umberto Mastroianni – Monumenti 1945/1946 – Ed. Electa, Milano 1986
- Il colore e la luce – L’arte contemporanea – Ed. Spirali, Milano 1985
- André Masson – L’universo della pittura – Ed. Mondatori, Milano 1989
- Clara Halter - Trace - Ed. Robert Laffont; First Edition, 1992
- Il tutto in frammenti: Arte del XX secolo. Una nuova interpretazione storica, Politi Editore, Milan, 1994
