= Hermes–Berthecourt station =

Railway station in Hermes, France

Hermes-Berthecourt
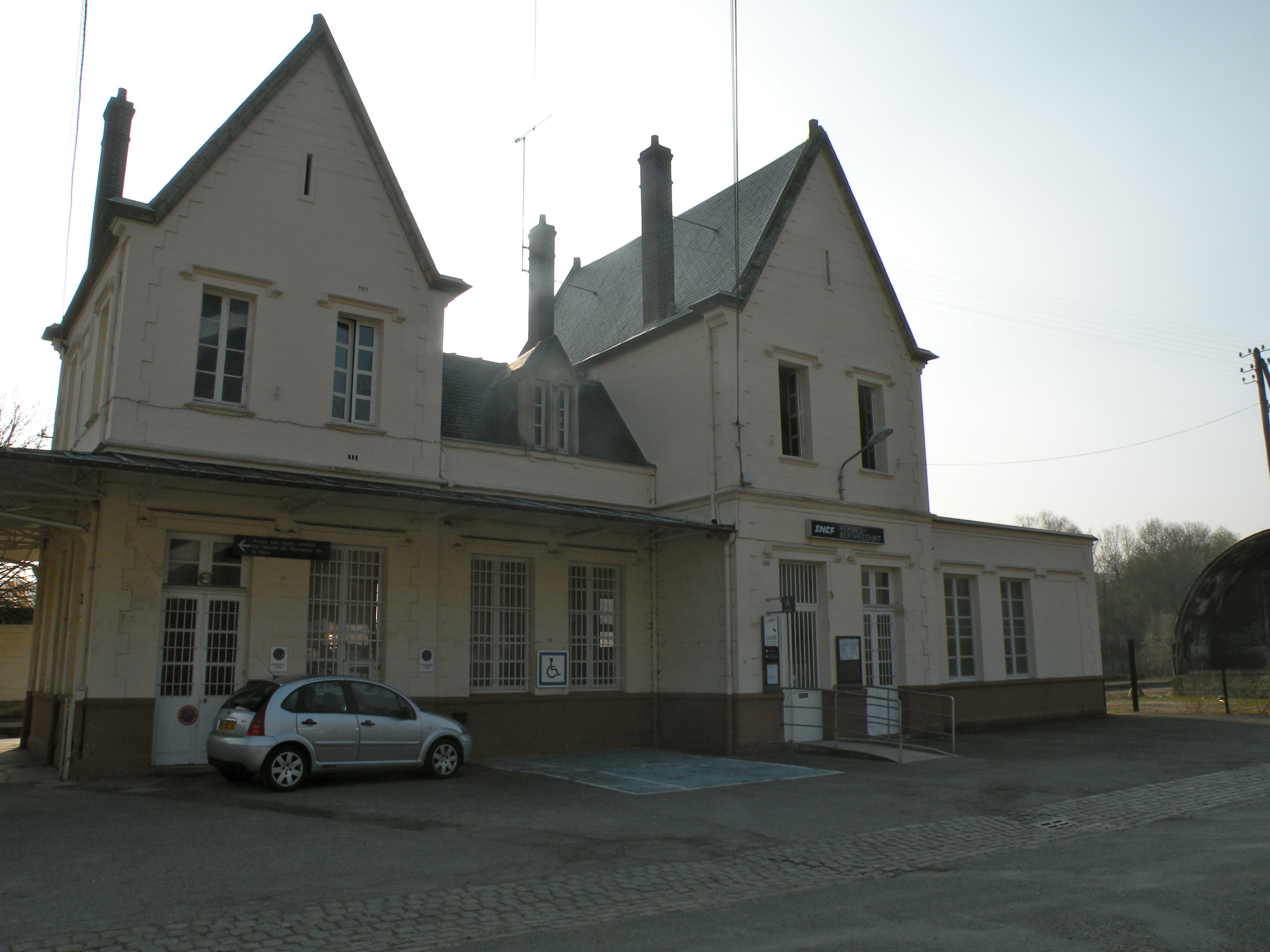
- Station entrance

General information
- Location: Rue de la Gare; Hermes
- Coordinates: 49°21′16″N 2°14′30″E
- Owner: SNCF Réseau/SNCF Gares et Connexions
- Line: Creil–Beauvais railway
- Platforms: 2
- Tracks: 2
- Train operators: TER Hauts de France

Construction
- Structure type: At-grade
- Cycle facilities: Bike park
- Architect: Félix Langlais

Other information
- Station code: 87313585
- Website: garesetconnexions.sncf/fr/gares-services/hermes-berthecourt

Services
Preceding station	TER Hauts-de-France	Following station
Villers-Saint-Sépulcre towards Beauvais	Proxi P32	Heilles-Mouchy towards Creil
Location

Hermes-Berthecourt is a railway station located in the commune of Berthecourt, right next to Hermes in the Oise department, France. The station is served by TER Hauts-de-France trains from Creil to Beauvais.

The station was the terminus of a secondary line to Persan-Beaumont operated by the Compagnie du chemin de fer de Hermes à Beaumont ("Hermes - Beaumont Railway Company").

== Railway situation ==
Established at 42m above sea level, the station of Hermes-Berthecourt is located at the kilometric milestone 73.238 of the Creil to Beauvais railway, between the stations of Heilles - Mouchy and Villers-Saint-Sépulcre.
