= Rochy-Condé station =

Railway station in Rochy-Condé, France

Rochy-Condé
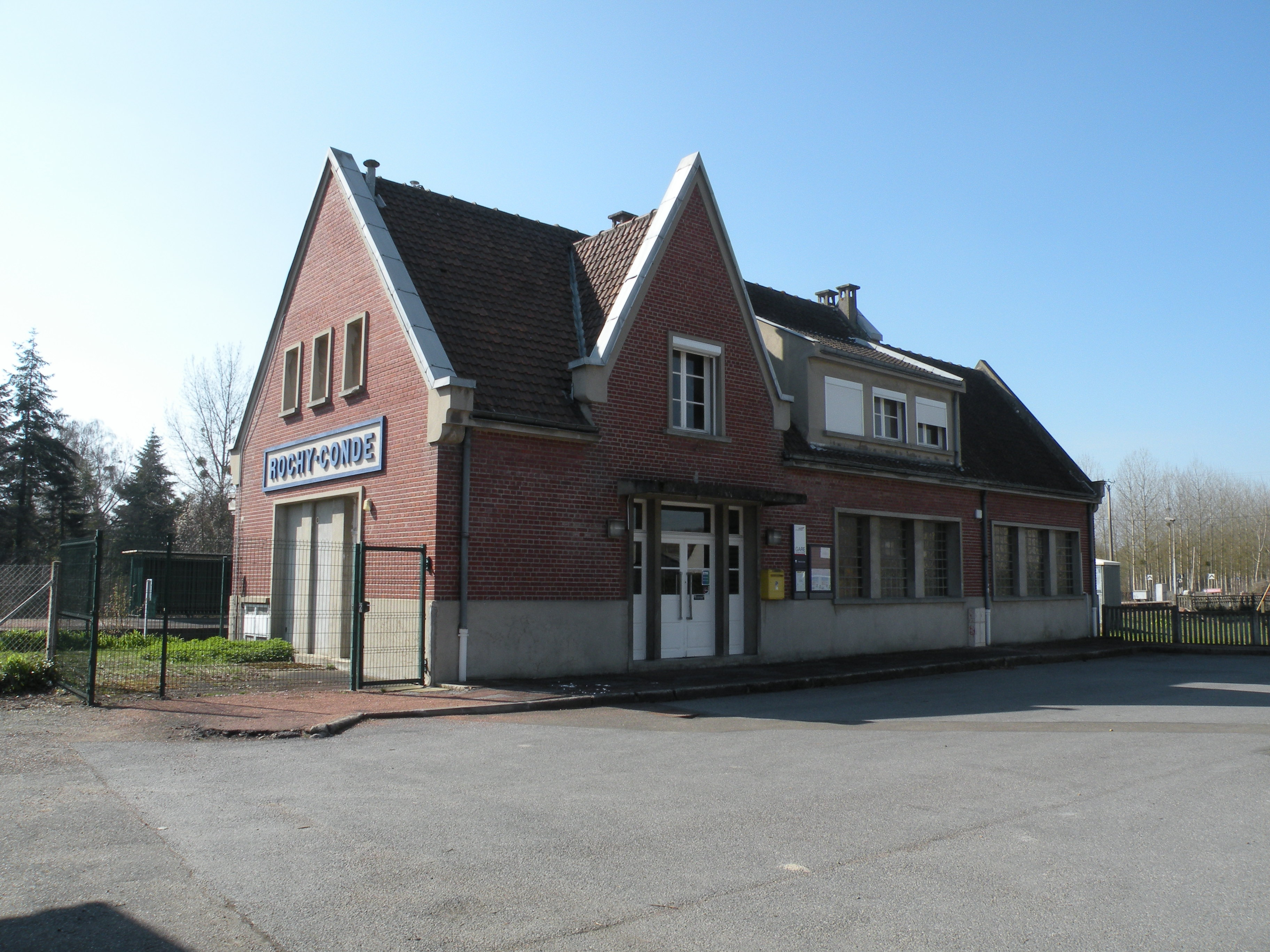
- Station buildings and entrance

General information
- Location: Allée de la gare Rochy-Condé
- Coordinates: 49°23′56″N 2°10′21″E
- Owner: RFF/SNCF
- Line: Creil–Beauvais railway

Other information
- Station code: 87313601

Services
Preceding station	TER Hauts-de-France	Following station
Beauvais Terminus	Proxi P32	Montreuil-sur-Thérain towards Creil
Location

Rochy-Condé is a railway station located in the commune of Rochy-Condé in the Oise department, France. The station is located at kilometre point 80.259 on the Creil - Beauvais line and is served by TER Hauts-de-France trains. It was also the terminus of a line between Rochy-Condé and Soissons via Clermont-de-l'Oise and Compiègne, now closed and partly abandoned.
