= Heilles =

- Commune
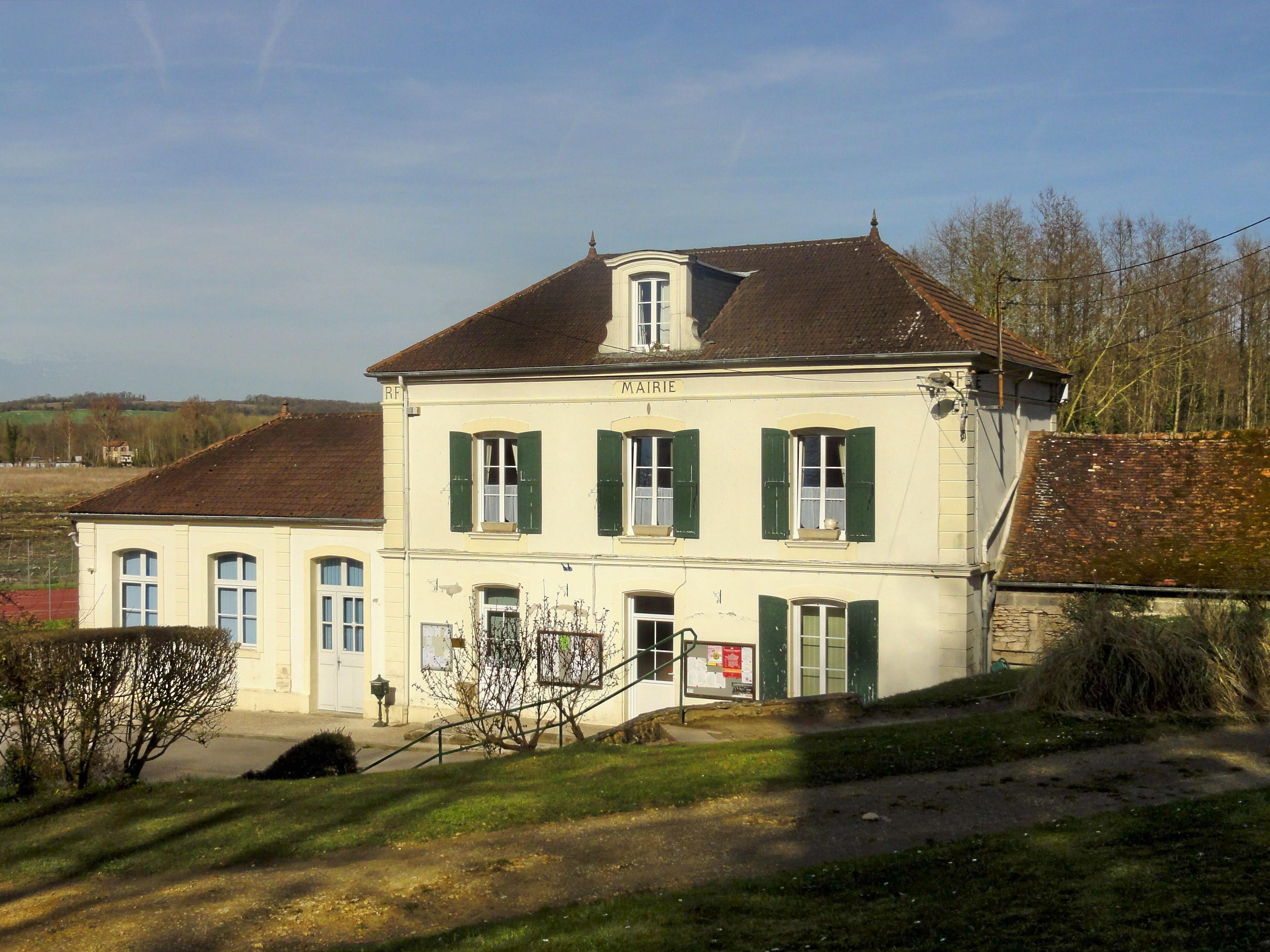
- The town hall in Heilles
- Location of Heilles
- Location within France Location within Hauts-de-France
- Coordinates: 49°20′06″N 2°15′46″E
- Country: France
- Region: Hauts-de-France
- Department: Oise
- Arrondissement: Clermont
- Canton: Mouy

Government
  - Mayor (2020–2026): Sébastien Fernet
- Area^{1}: 6.01 km^{2} (2.32 sq mi)
- Elevation: 45 m (148 ft)
- Highest elevation: 123 m (404 ft)
- Lowest elevation: 41 m (135 ft)
- Population (2023): 644
  - Density: 107/km^{2} (278/sq mi)
- Time zone: UTC+01:00 (CET)
  - Summer (DST): UTC+02:00 (CEST)
- INSEE/Postal code: 60307 /60250
- ^{1} French Land Register data, which excludes lakes, ponds, glaciers > 1 km^{2} (0.386 sq mi or 247 acres) and river estuaries.

Heilles (French pronunciation: [ɛj]) is a commune in the Oise department in northern France. Heilles-Mouchy station has rail connections to Beauvais and Creil.

== See also ==
- Communes of the Oise department
