= Mouy =

- Commune
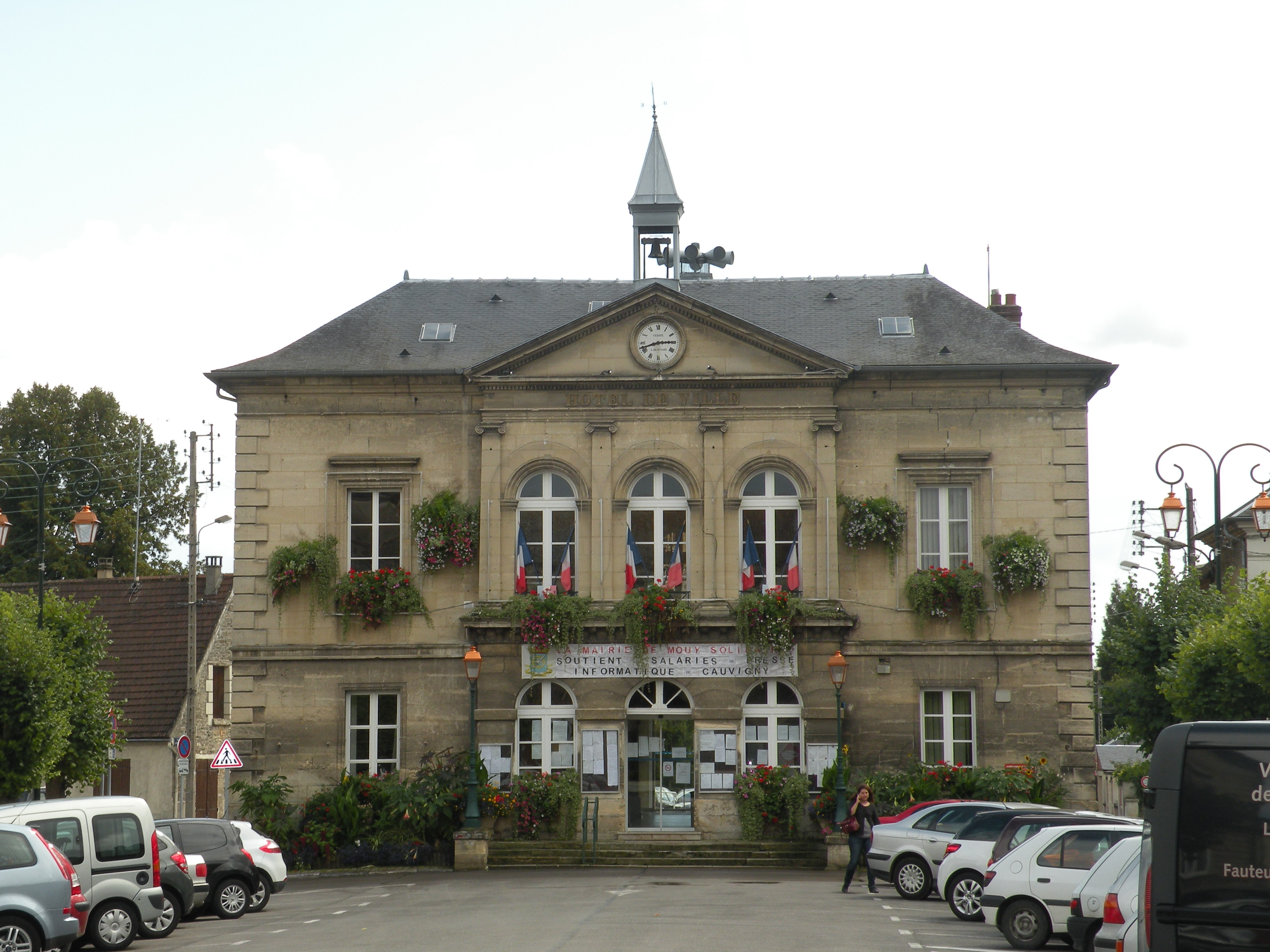
- The town hall in Mouy
- Location of Mouy
- Location within France Location within Hauts-de-France
- Coordinates: 49°19′00″N 2°19′13″E
- Country: France
- Region: Hauts-de-France
- Department: Oise
- Arrondissement: Clermont
- Canton: Mouy

Government
  - Mayor (2020–2026): Philippe Mauger
- Area^{1}: 9.87 km^{2} (3.81 sq mi)
- Elevation: 42 m (138 ft)
- Highest elevation: 123 m (404 ft)
- Lowest elevation: 37 m (121 ft)
- Population (2023): 5,319
  - Density: 539/km^{2} (1,400/sq mi)
- Time zone: UTC+01:00 (CET)
  - Summer (DST): UTC+02:00 (CEST)
- INSEE/Postal code: 60439 /60250
- ^{1} French Land Register data, which excludes lakes, ponds, glaciers > 1 km^{2} (0.386 sq mi or 247 acres) and river estuaries.

Mouy is a commune in the Oise department in northern France. This commune is located 85 kilometers from Paris. Mouy-Bury station has rail connections to Beauvais and Creil.

== Population ==
Historical population
Year	Pop.	±% p.a.
1968	3,791	—
1975	4,581	+2.74%
1982	4,812	+0.71%
1990	5,034	+0.57%
1999	5,328	+0.63%
2007	5,284	−0.10%
2012	5,249	−0.13%
2017	5,288	+0.15%
2023	5,319	+0.10%
Source: INSEE

== See also ==
- Communes of the Oise department
