= Montreuil-sur-Thérain station =

Railway station in Montreuil-sur-Thérain, France

Montreuil-sur-Thérain
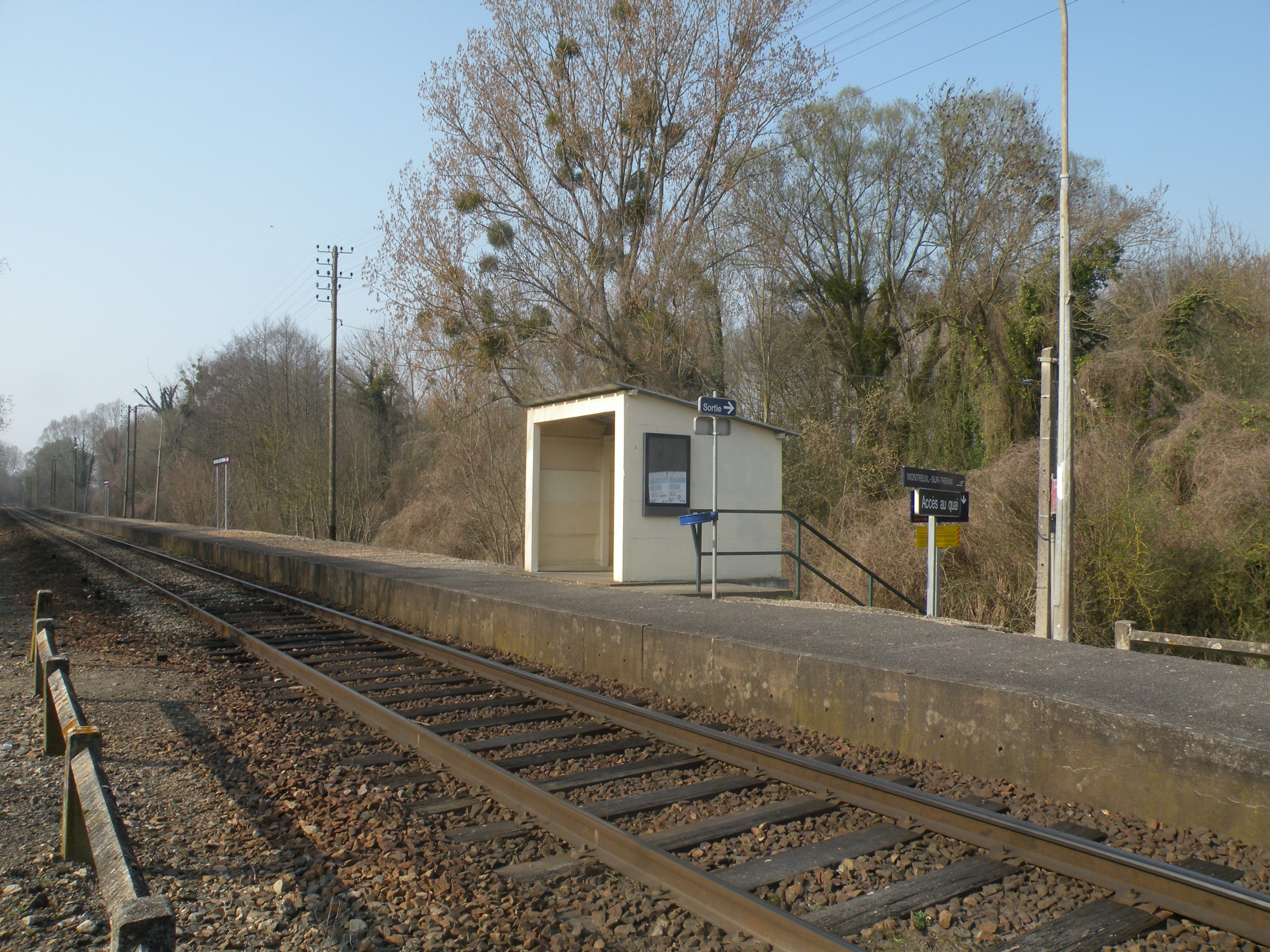
- Station platform

General information
- Location: Montreuil-sur-Thérain
- Coordinates: 49°22′52″N 2°12′3″E
- Owner: RFF/SNCF
- Line: Creil–Beauvais railway

Other information
- Station code: 87316406

Services
Preceding station	TER Hauts-de-France	Following station
Rochy-Condé towards Beauvais	Proxi P32	Villers-Saint-Sépulcre towards Creil
Location

Montreuil-sur-Thérain is a railway station located in the commune of Montreuil-sur-Thérain in the Oise department, France. The station is served by TER Hauts-de-France trains from Creil to Beauvais.
