= Montreuil-sur-Thérain =

- Commune
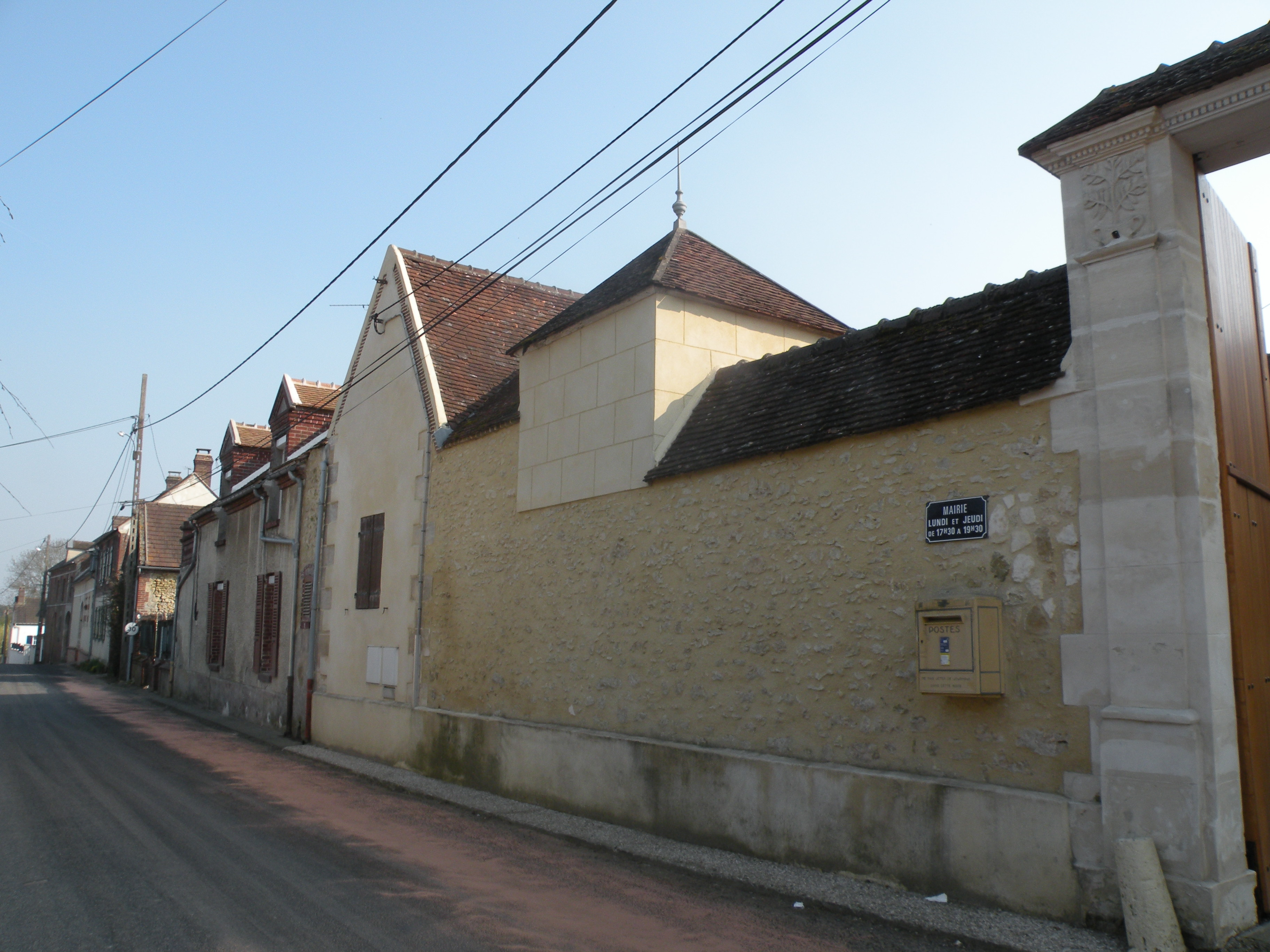
- The town hall in Montreuil-sur-Thérain
- Location of Montreuil-sur-Thérain
- Location within France Location within Hauts-de-France
- Coordinates: 49°22′52″N 2°11′39″E
- Country: France
- Region: Hauts-de-France
- Department: Oise
- Arrondissement: Beauvais
- Canton: Chaumont-en-Vexin
- Intercommunality: CC Thelloise

Government
  - Mayor (2020–2026): Alain Arnold
- Area^{1}: 1.47 km^{2} (0.57 sq mi)
- Elevation: 54 m (177 ft)
- Highest elevation: 147 m (482 ft)
- Lowest elevation: 50 m (160 ft)
- Population (2023): 239
  - Density: 163/km^{2} (421/sq mi)
- Time zone: UTC+01:00 (CET)
  - Summer (DST): UTC+02:00 (CEST)
- INSEE/Postal code: 60426 /60134
- ^{1} French Land Register data, which excludes lakes, ponds, glaciers > 1 km^{2} (0.386 sq mi or 247 acres) and river estuaries.

Montreuil-sur-Thérain (French pronunciation: [mɔ̃tʁœj syʁ teʁɛ̃], literally Montreuil on Thérain) is a commune in the Oise department in northern France. Montreuil-sur-Thérain station has rail connections to Beauvais and Creil.

== See also ==
- Communes of the Oise department
