= Hermes, Oise =

Hermes
- Commune
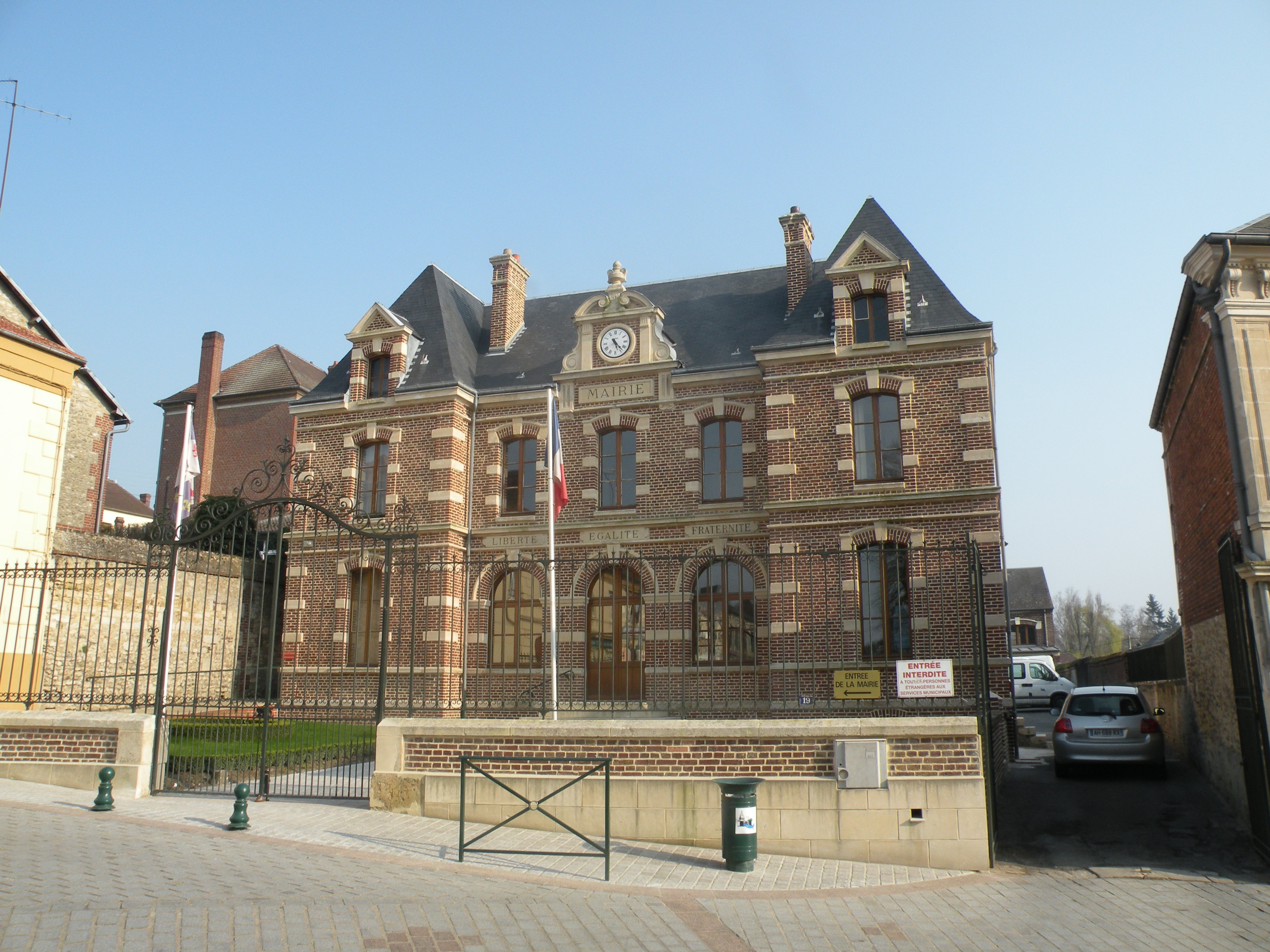
- The town hall in Hermes

- Coat of arms
- Location of Hermes
- Location within France Location within Hauts-de-France
- Coordinates: 49°21′30″N 2°14′48″E
- Country: France
- Region: Hauts-de-France
- Department: Oise
- Arrondissement: Beauvais
- Canton: Mouy
- Intercommunality: CA Beauvaisis

Government
  - Mayor (2020–2026): Grégory Palandre
- Area^{1}: 8.88 km^{2} (3.43 sq mi)
- Elevation: 48 m (157 ft)
- Highest elevation: 139 m (456 ft)
- Lowest elevation: 43 m (141 ft)
- Population (2023): 2,466
  - Density: 278/km^{2} (719/sq mi)
- Time zone: UTC+01:00 (CET)
  - Summer (DST): UTC+02:00 (CEST)
- INSEE/Postal code: 60313 /60370
- ^{1} French Land Register data, which excludes lakes, ponds, glaciers > 1 km^{2} (0.386 sq mi or 247 acres) and river estuaries.

Hermes (French pronunciation: [ɛʁm]) is a commune in the Oise department in northern France. Hermes-Berthecourt station has rail connections to Beauvais and Creil.

== Population ==
Historical population
Year	Pop.	±% p.a.
1968	1,588	—
1975	1,802	+1.82%
1982	1,828	+0.20%
1990	1,964	+0.90%
1999	2,331	+1.92%
2007	2,440	+0.57%
2012	2,536	+0.77%
2017	2,498	−0.30%
2023	2,466	−0.21%
Source: INSEE

== See also ==
- Communes of the Oise department
