= Heilles–Mouchy station =

Railway station in Heilles, France

Heilles–Mouchy
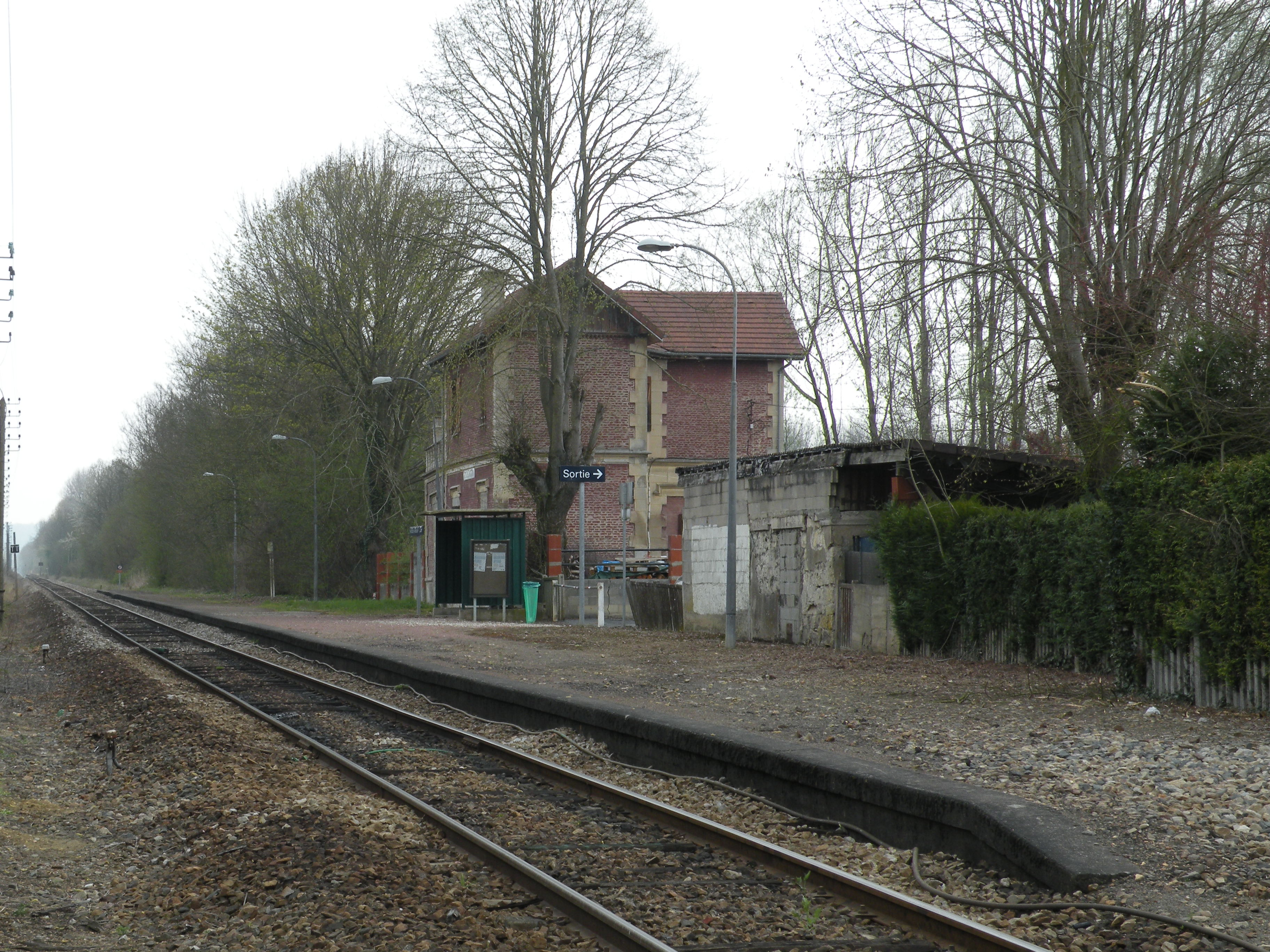

General information
- Location: Heilles
- Coordinates: 49°20′25″N 2°16′22″E
- Owner: RFF/SNCF
- Line: Creil–Beauvais railway

Other information
- Station code: 87316398

Services
Preceding station	TER Hauts-de-France	Following station
Hermes–Berthecourt towards Beauvais	Proxi P32	Mouy–Bury towards Creil
Location

Heilles–Mouchy is a railway station located in the commune of Heilles in the Oise department, France. The station is served by TER Hauts-de-France trains from Creil to Beauvais.
