= Villers-Saint-Sépulcre =

- Commune
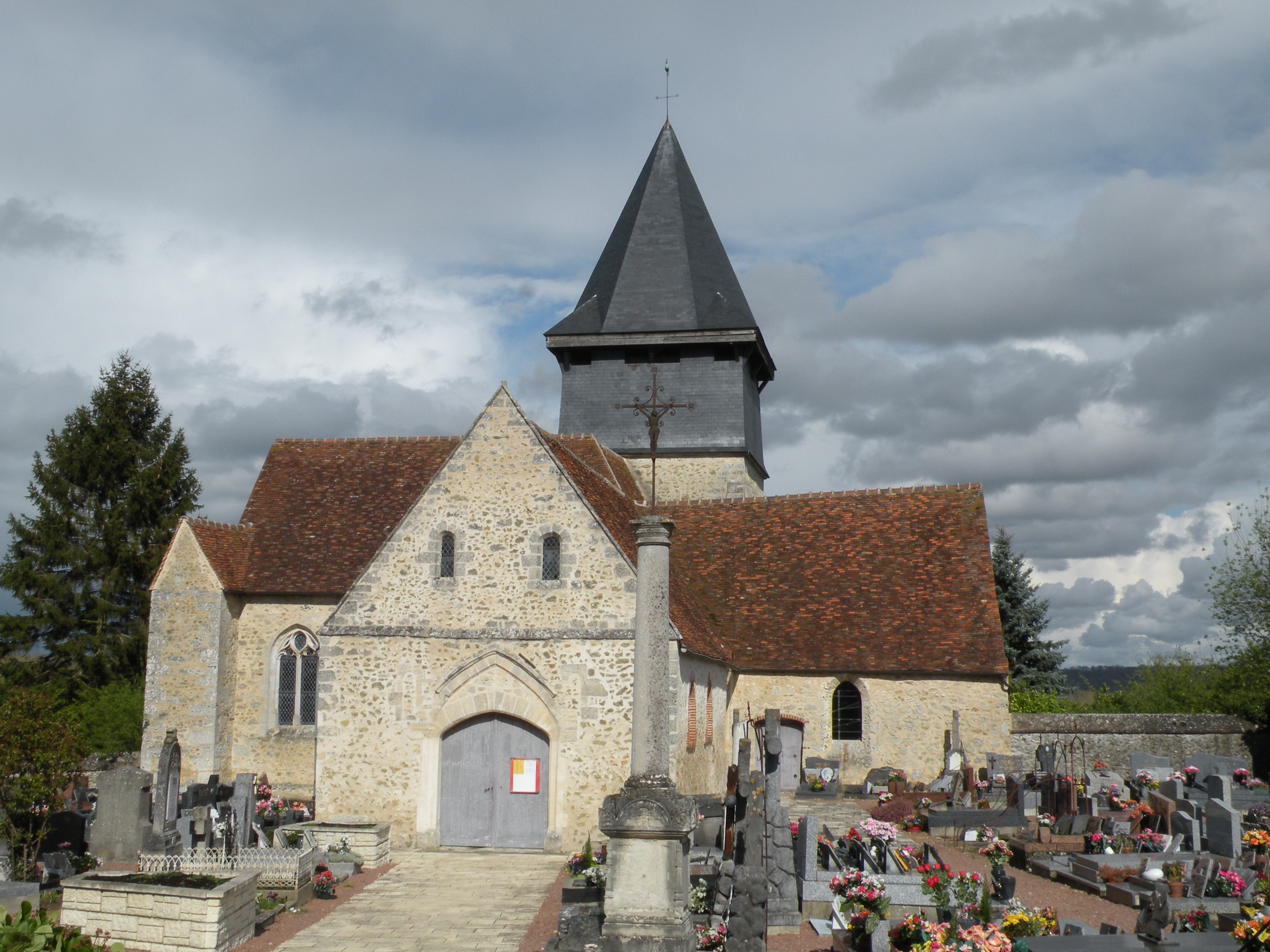
- The church in Villers-Saint-Sépulcre
- Location of Villers-Saint-Sépulcre
- Location within France Location within Hauts-de-France
- Coordinates: 49°21′58″N 2°13′00″E
- Country: France
- Region: Hauts-de-France
- Department: Oise
- Arrondissement: Beauvais
- Canton: Chaumont-en-Vexin

Government
  - Mayor (2020–2026): Pascal Wawrin
- Area^{1}: 7.29 km^{2} (2.81 sq mi)
- Elevation: 52 m (171 ft)
- Highest elevation: 147 m (482 ft)
- Lowest elevation: 47 m (154 ft)
- Population (2023): 951
  - Density: 130/km^{2} (338/sq mi)
- Time zone: UTC+01:00 (CET)
  - Summer (DST): UTC+02:00 (CEST)
- INSEE/Postal code: 60685 /60134
- ^{1} French Land Register data, which excludes lakes, ponds, glaciers > 1 km^{2} (0.386 sq mi or 247 acres) and river estuaries.

Villers-Saint-Sépulcre (French pronunciation: [vilɛʁ sɛ̃ sepylkʁ]) is a commune in the Oise department in northern France. Villers-Saint-Sépulcre station has rail connections to Beauvais and Creil.

== See also ==
- Communes of the Oise department
