= Rochy-Condé =

- Commune
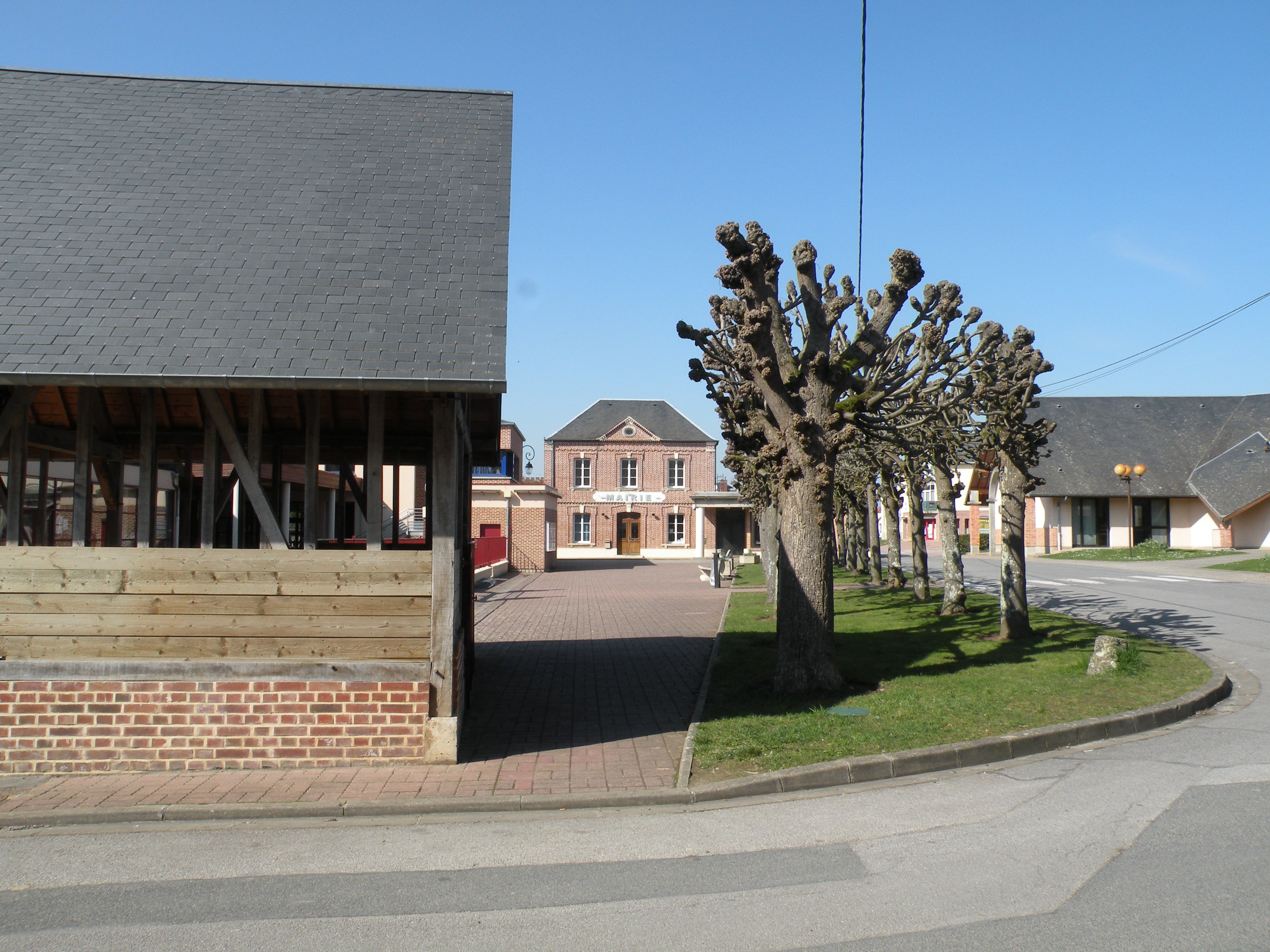
- The town hall in Rochy-Condé
- Location of Rochy-Condé
- Location within France Location within Hauts-de-France
- Coordinates: 49°24′04″N 2°11′05″E
- Country: France
- Region: Hauts-de-France
- Department: Oise
- Arrondissement: Beauvais
- Canton: Mouy
- Intercommunality: CA Beauvaisis

Government
  - Mayor (2020–2026): Robert Truptil
- Area^{1}: 6.38 km^{2} (2.46 sq mi)
- Elevation: 55 m (180 ft)
- Highest elevation: 106 m (348 ft)
- Lowest elevation: 52 m (171 ft)
- Population (2023): 995
  - Density: 156/km^{2} (404/sq mi)
- Time zone: UTC+01:00 (CET)
  - Summer (DST): UTC+02:00 (CEST)
- INSEE/Postal code: 60542 /60510
- ^{1} French Land Register data, which excludes lakes, ponds, glaciers > 1 km^{2} (0.386 sq mi or 247 acres) and river estuaries.

Rochy-Condé (French pronunciation: [ʁɔʃi kɔ̃de]) is a commune in the Oise department in northern France. Rochy-Condé station has rail connections to Beauvais and Creil.

== See also ==
- Communes of the Oise department
