= Balagny-sur-Thérain =

- Commune
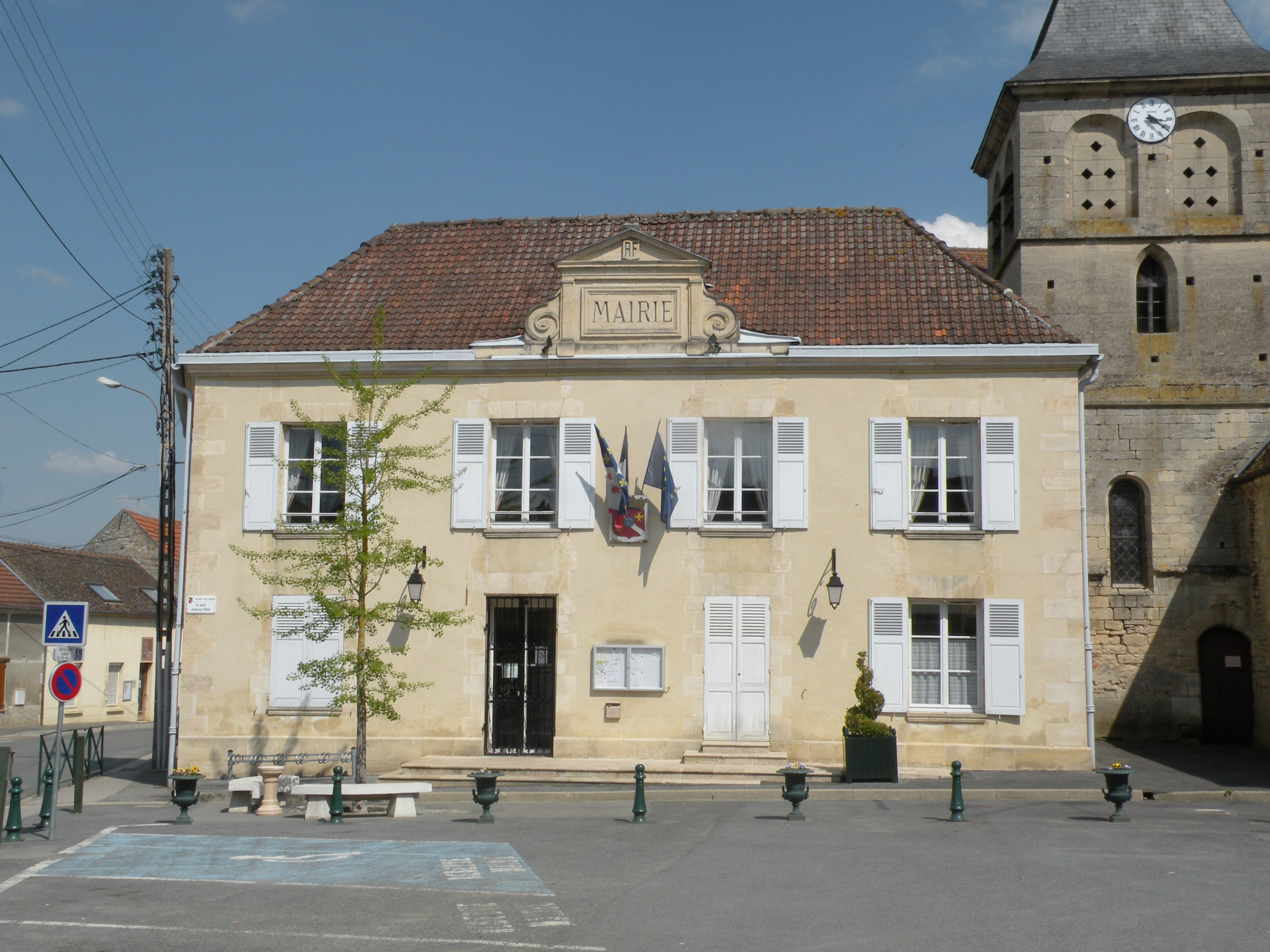
- Town hall

- Coat of arms
- Location of Balagny-sur-Thérain
- Location within France Location within Hauts-de-France
- Coordinates: 49°17′46″N 2°20′14″E
- Country: France
- Region: Hauts-de-France
- Department: Oise
- Arrondissement: Senlis
- Canton: Montataire

Government
  - Mayor (2020–2026): Philippe Maréchal
- Area^{1}: 6.8 km^{2} (2.6 sq mi)
- Elevation: 39 m (128 ft)
- Highest elevation: 116 m (381 ft)
- Lowest elevation: 33 m (108 ft)
- Population (2023): 1,628
  - Density: 240/km^{2} (620/sq mi)
- Time zone: UTC+01:00 (CET)
  - Summer (DST): UTC+02:00 (CEST)
- INSEE/Postal code: 60044 /60250
- ^{1} French Land Register data, which excludes lakes, ponds, glaciers > 1 km^{2} (0.386 sq mi or 247 acres) and river estuaries.

Balagny-sur-Thérain (French pronunciation: [balaɲi syʁ teʁɛ̃], literally Balagny on Thérain) is a commune in the Oise department in northern France. Balagny-Saint-Épin station has rail connections to Beauvais and Creil.

== Population ==
Historical population
| Year | Pop. | ±% p.a. |
|---|---|---|
| 1968 | 1,332 | — |
| 1975 | 1,393 | +0.64% |
| 1982 | 1,299 | −0.99% |
| 1990 | 1,487 | +1.70% |
| 1999 | 1,418 | −0.53% |
| 2007 | 1,426 | +0.07% |
| 2012 | 1,424 | −0.03% |
| 2017 | 1,723 | +3.89% |
| 2023 | 1,628 | −0.94% |
Source: INSEE

== See also ==
- Communes of the Oise department
