= Gilbert Brownstone =

Swiss-American museum director (born 1938)

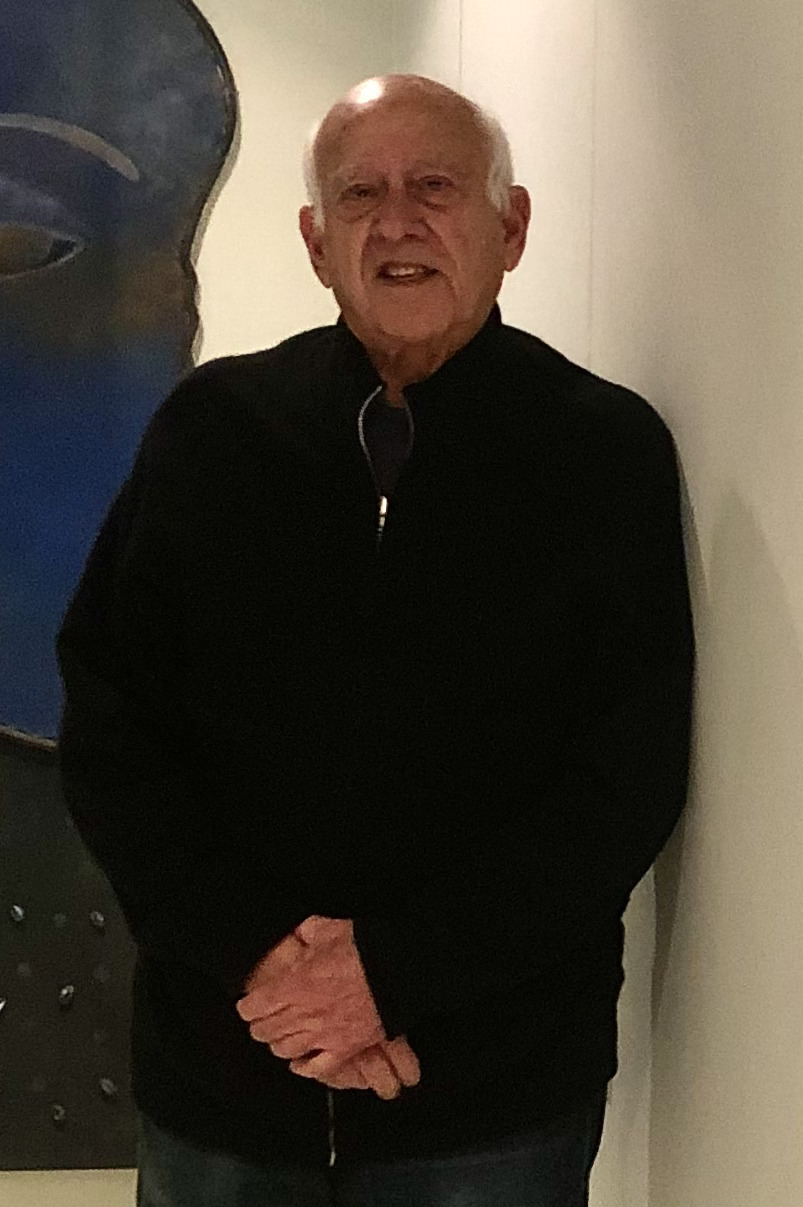
- Brownstone in 2021
- Born: April 5, 1938 (age 87); New York City, New York, U.S.
- Known for: Director

Gilbert Brownstone (born April 5, 1938, in New York City, New York) is a contemporary art curator and philanthropist. In 1991, Brownstone married Catherine Brownstone, the former fashion director of Vogue France and Elle.

== Education ==
He studied political science as an undergraduate and then entered graduate school at Sorbonne University and took courses in art history.

== Early career ==
In 1967, he worked for the Musée d'Art Moderne de Paris, in the Contemporary Art section. While working at the Musée d'Art Moderne de Paris, he participated in designing and curating exhibitions by artists such as Shusaku Arakawa, Edward Kienholz, Andy Warhol, Lucio Fontana, Joseph Kosuth, and Jesús Rafael Soto, among others. In 1974, he was appointed director of the Musée Picasso (Antibes), then curator of the Israel Museum in Jerusalem.

== Museums and expansion projects ==
In the 1982s, Brownstone opened his commercial art gallery in Paris, France, called Gilbert Brownstone & Cie., promoting minimalist art trend in Paris. In 1999, he created the Brownstone Foundation with the goal of promoting social justice through culture. Over the past two decades, Gilbert Brownstone has made significant donations of art to museums and institutions such as the Centre Pompidou, Norton Museum of Art, and the Museo Nacional de Bellas Artes de La Habana of Cuba. In 2011, Brownstone gave the Cuban people a set of 138 screen prints depicting artists such as Pablo Picasso, Marcel Duchamp, Alexander Calder, and Joan Miró.

== Selected publications and articles ==
- Art in Cuba, Groupe Flammarion, Paris, France, April 2019 ISBN 978-2-08-020388-5
