= Bury, Oise =

Bury
- Commune
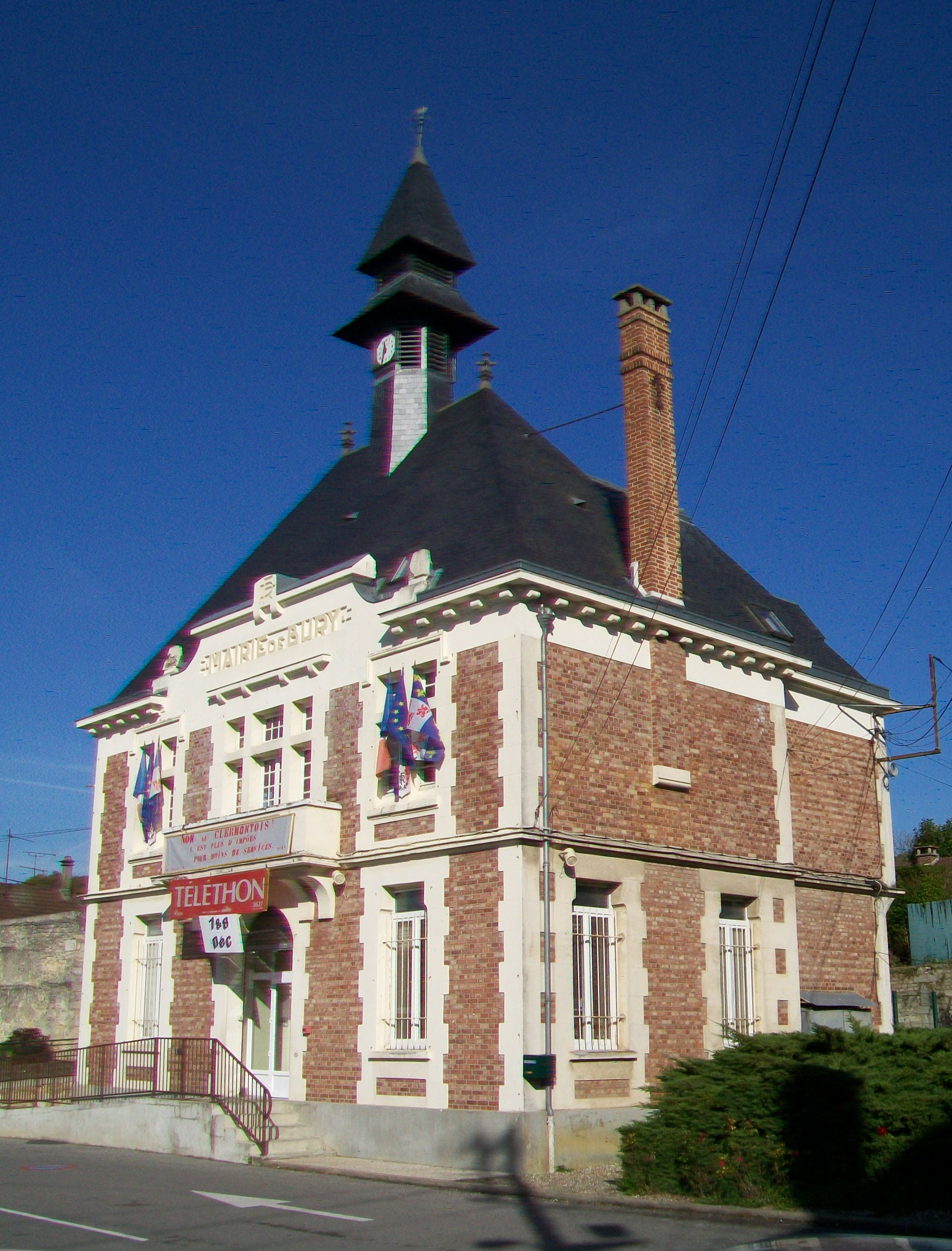
- The town hall in Bury

- Coat of arms
- Location of Bury
- Location within France Location within Hauts-de-France
- Coordinates: 49°18′52″N 2°20′39″E
- Country: France
- Region: Hauts-de-France
- Department: Oise
- Arrondissement: Clermont
- Canton: Mouy

Government
  - Mayor (2020–2026): David Belval
- Area^{1}: 17.05 km^{2} (6.58 sq mi)
- Elevation: 33 m (108 ft)
- Highest elevation: 124 m (407 ft)
- Lowest elevation: 33 m (108 ft)
- Population (2023): 2,838
  - Density: 166.5/km^{2} (431.1/sq mi)
- Time zone: UTC+01:00 (CET)
  - Summer (DST): UTC+02:00 (CEST)
- INSEE/Postal code: 60116 /60250
- ^{1} French Land Register data, which excludes lakes, ponds, glaciers > 1 km^{2} (0.386 sq mi or 247 acres) and river estuaries.

Bury (French pronunciation: [byʁi]) is a commune in the Oise department in northern France.

== Population ==
Historical population

Year	Pop.	±% p.a.
1793	1,107	—
1821	1,268	+0.49%
1846	1,638	+1.03%
1872	2,222	+1.18%
1901	2,408	+0.28%
1926	2,230	−0.31%
1946	1,913	−0.76%
1962	2,139	+0.70%
1968	2,540	+2.91%

Year	Pop.	±% p.a.
1975	2,662	+0.67%
1982	2,657	−0.03%
1990	2,822	+0.76%
1999	2,891	+0.27%
2007	2,982	+0.39%
2012	2,977	−0.03%
2017	2,971	−0.04%
2023	2,838	−0.76%

Source: EHESS and INSEE (1968-2023)

== Notable people ==
- Alexandre Martin (27 April 1815 in Bury – 28 May 1895), nicknamed Albert l'ouvrier ("Albert the Worker"), was a socialist politician of the French Second Republic, the first member of the industrial working class to be in French government.

== See also ==
- Communes of the Oise department
