= Berneuil, Somme =

Berneuil
- Commune
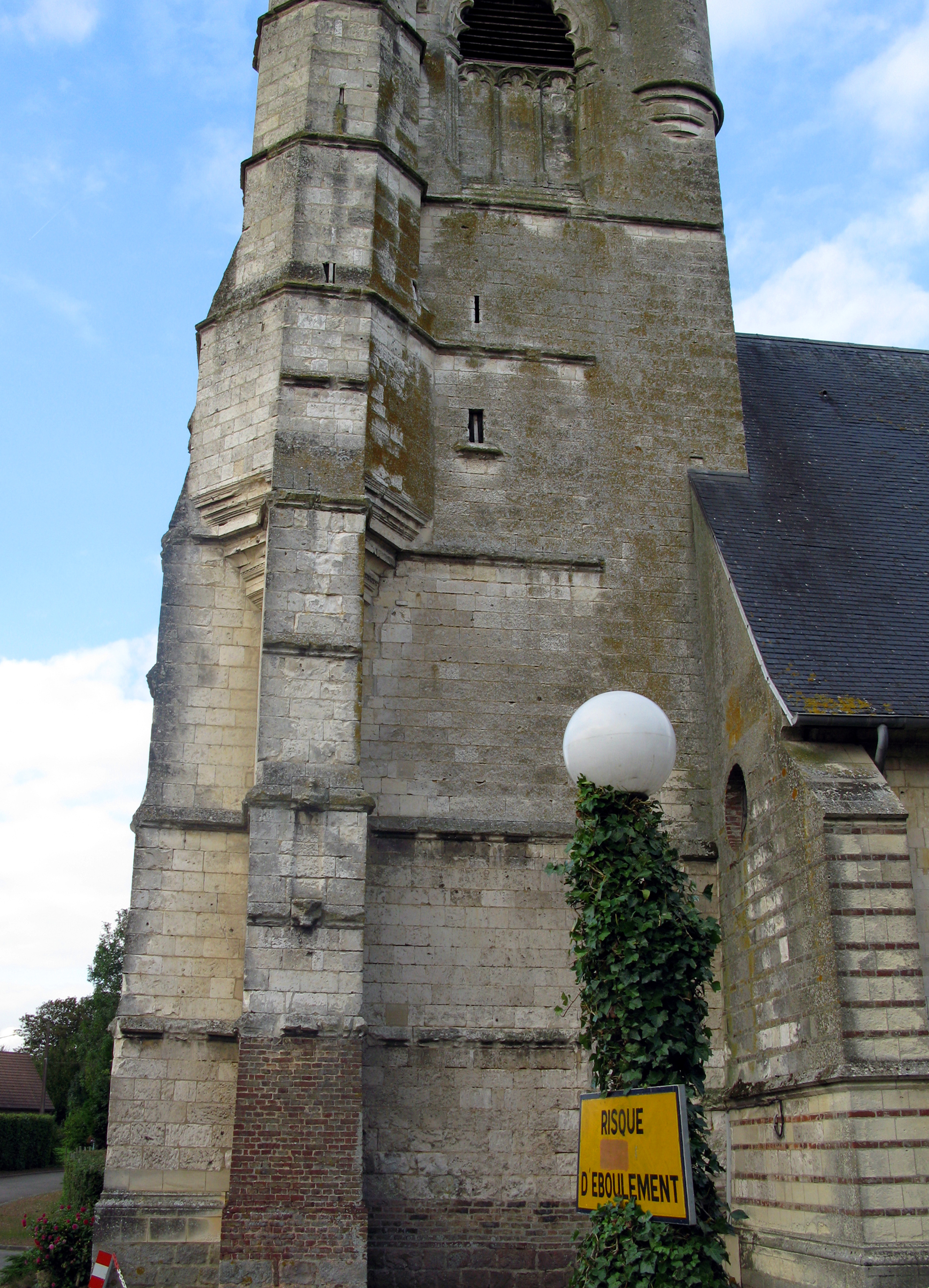
- The bell tower of the church in Berneuil
- Location of Berneuil
- Location within France Location within Hauts-de-France
- Coordinates: 50°05′43″N 2°10′19″E
- Country: France
- Region: Hauts-de-France
- Department: Somme
- Arrondissement: Amiens
- Canton: Doullens
- Intercommunality: CC Territoire Nord Picardie

Government
  - Mayor (2020–2026): Francis Flahaut
- Area^{1}: 5.51 km^{2} (2.13 sq mi)
- Elevation: 138 m (453 ft)
- Highest elevation: 146 m (479 ft)
- Lowest elevation: 78 m (256 ft)
- Population (2023): 279
  - Density: 50.6/km^{2} (131/sq mi)
- Time zone: UTC+01:00 (CET)
  - Summer (DST): UTC+02:00 (CEST)
- INSEE/Postal code: 80089 /80620
- ^{1} French Land Register data, which excludes lakes, ponds, glaciers > 1 km^{2} (0.386 sq mi or 247 acres) and river estuaries.

Berneuil (French pronunciation: [bɛʁnœj]; Picard: Bèrneu) is a commune in the Somme department in Hauts-de-France in northern France.

== Geography ==
Berneuil is situated at the junction of the D216 and the D77 roads, some 20 miles (32 km) east of Abbeville.

== Population ==
Historical population
Year	Pop.	±% p.a.
1968	234	—
1975	250	+0.95%
1982	213	−2.26%
1990	211	−0.12%
1999	214	+0.16%
2007	254	+2.17%
2012	262	+0.62%
2017	257	−0.38%
2023	279	+1.38%
Source: INSEE

== Places of interest ==
- The church

== See also ==
- Communes of the Somme department
