= Heuzecourt =

- Commune
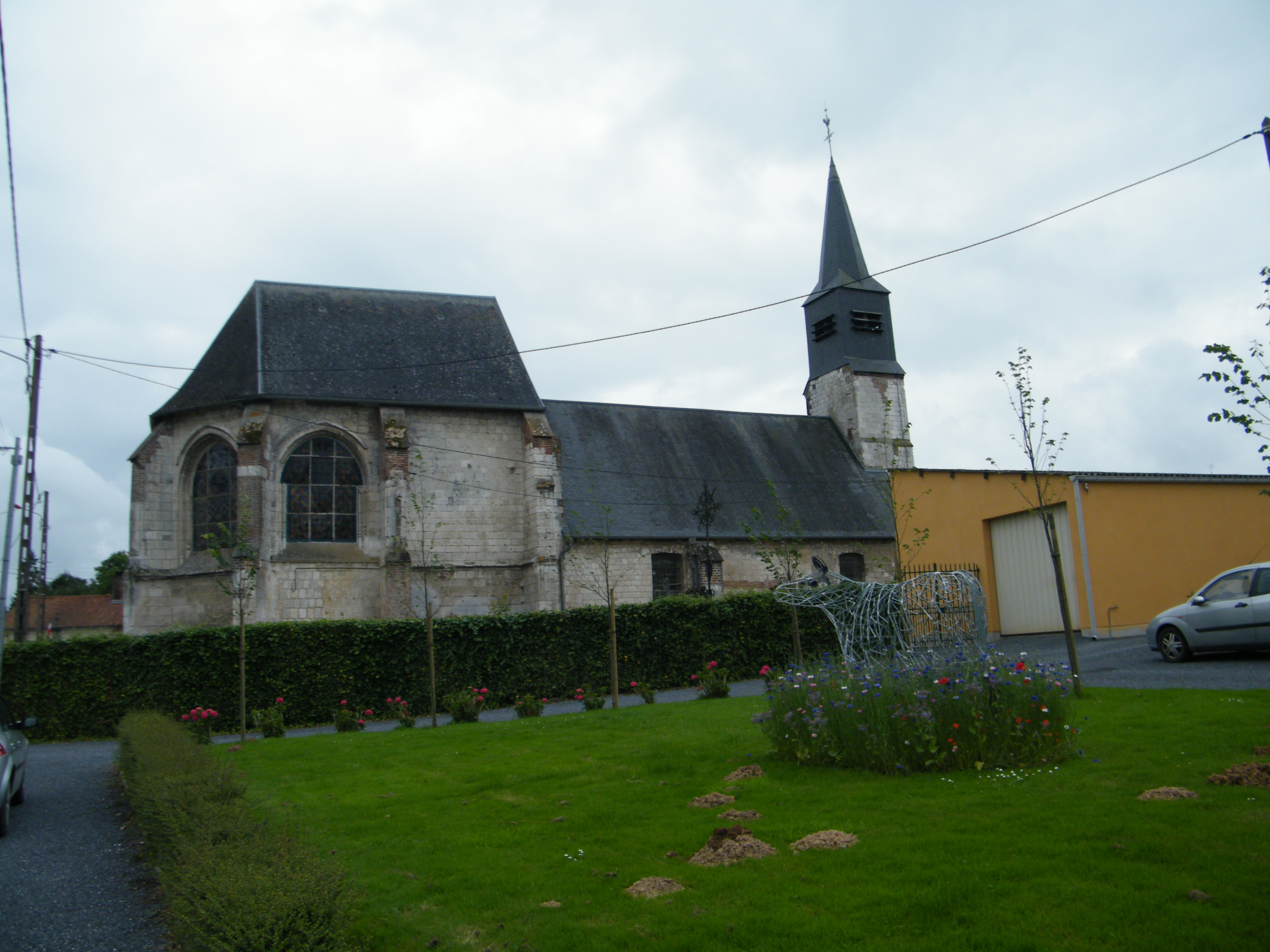
- The church in Heuzecourt
- Location of Heuzecourt
- Location within France Location within Hauts-de-France
- Coordinates: 50°10′28″N 2°10′03″E
- Country: France
- Region: Hauts-de-France
- Department: Somme
- Arrondissement: Amiens
- Canton: Doullens
- Intercommunality: CC Territoire Nord Picardie

Government
  - Mayor (2020–2026): Jean-Paul Milchilsen
- Area^{1}: 7.2 km^{2} (2.8 sq mi)
- Elevation: 85 m (279 ft)
- Highest elevation: 153 m (502 ft)
- Lowest elevation: 63 m (207 ft)
- Population (2023): 165
  - Density: 23/km^{2} (59/sq mi)
- Time zone: UTC+01:00 (CET)
  - Summer (DST): UTC+02:00 (CEST)
- INSEE/Postal code: 80439 /80370
- ^{1} French Land Register data, which excludes lakes, ponds, glaciers > 1 km^{2} (0.386 sq mi or 247 acres) and river estuaries.

Heuzecourt (French pronunciation: [øzkuʁ]) is a commune in the Somme department in Hauts-de-France in northern France.

== Geography ==
Heuzecourt is situated on the D99 road, some 17 miles (27 km) northeast of Abbeville.

== Population ==
Historical population
Year	Pop.	±% p.a.
1968	198	—
1975	194	−0.29%
1982	172	−1.70%
1990	154	−1.37%
1999	134	−1.53%
2007	144	+0.90%
2012	164	+2.64%
2017	169	+0.60%
2023	165	−0.40%
Source: INSEE

== See also ==
- Communes of the Somme department
