= Domesmont =

- Commune
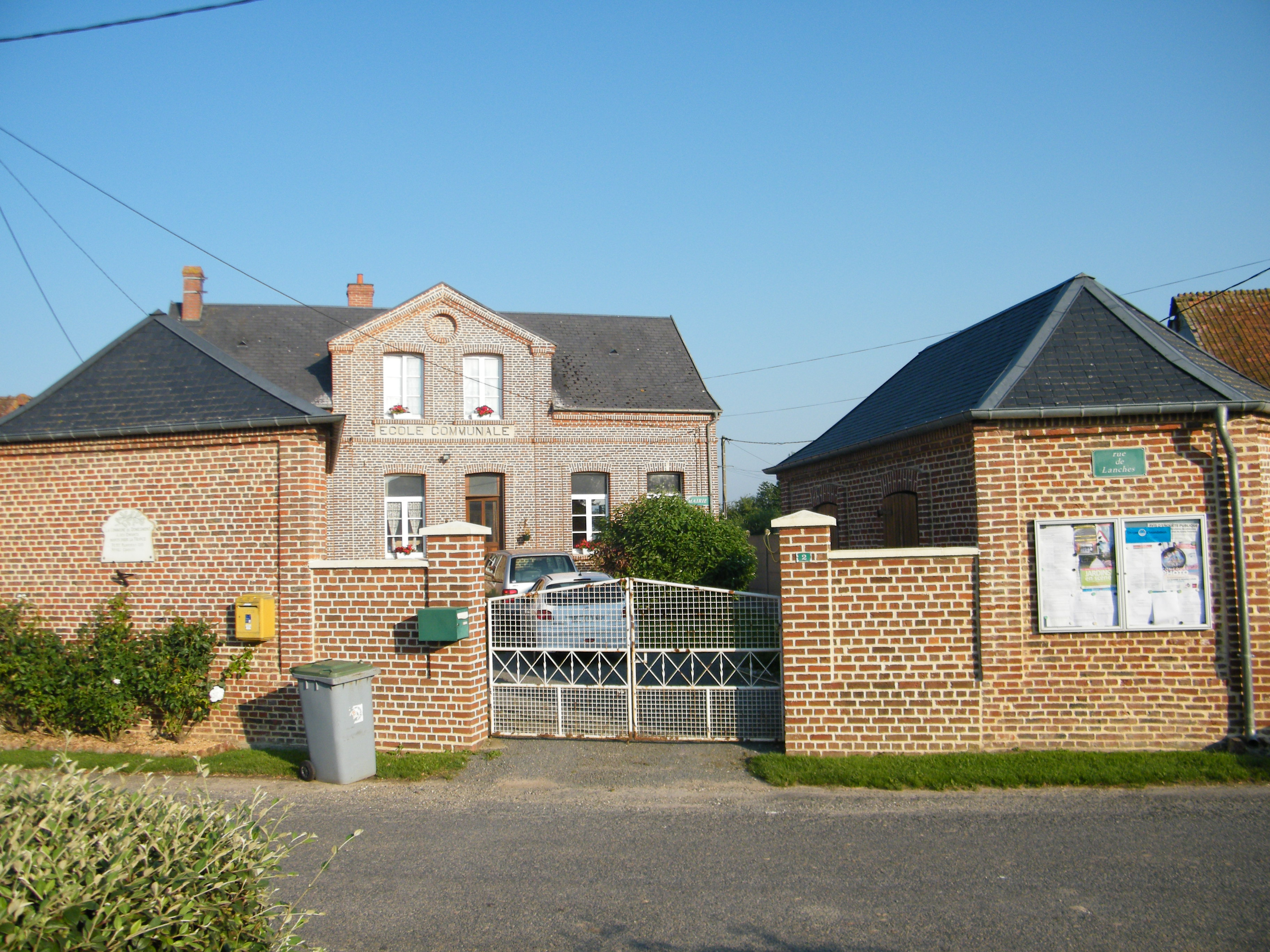
- The town hall and school in Domesmont

- Coat of arms
- Location of Domesmont
- Location within France Location within Hauts-de-France
- Coordinates: 50°07′19″N 2°08′53″E
- Country: France
- Region: Hauts-de-France
- Department: Somme
- Arrondissement: Amiens
- Canton: Doullens
- Intercommunality: CC Territoire Nord Picardie

Government
  - Mayor (2020–2026): Joël Bazin
- Area^{1}: 1.94 km^{2} (0.75 sq mi)
- Elevation: 143 m (469 ft)
- Highest elevation: 150 m (490 ft)
- Lowest elevation: 90 m (300 ft)
- Population (2023): 44
  - Density: 23/km^{2} (59/sq mi)
- Time zone: UTC+01:00 (CET)
  - Summer (DST): UTC+02:00 (CEST)
- INSEE/Postal code: 80243 /80370
- ^{1} French Land Register data, which excludes lakes, ponds, glaciers > 1 km^{2} (0.386 sq mi or 247 acres) and river estuaries.

Domesmont (Picard: Domémont ) is a commune in the Somme department in Hauts-de-France in northern France.

== Geography ==
Domesmont is situated on the D188 road, some 20 miles (32 km) east of Abbeville.

== Population ==
Historical population
Year	Pop.	±% p.a.
1968	71	—
1975	63	−1.69%
1982	60	−0.69%
1990	52	−1.77%
1999	44	−1.84%
2007	40	−1.18%
2012	46	+2.83%
2017	45	−0.44%
2023	44	−0.37%
Source: INSEE

== See also ==
- Communes of the Somme department
