= Fieffes-Montrelet =

- Commune
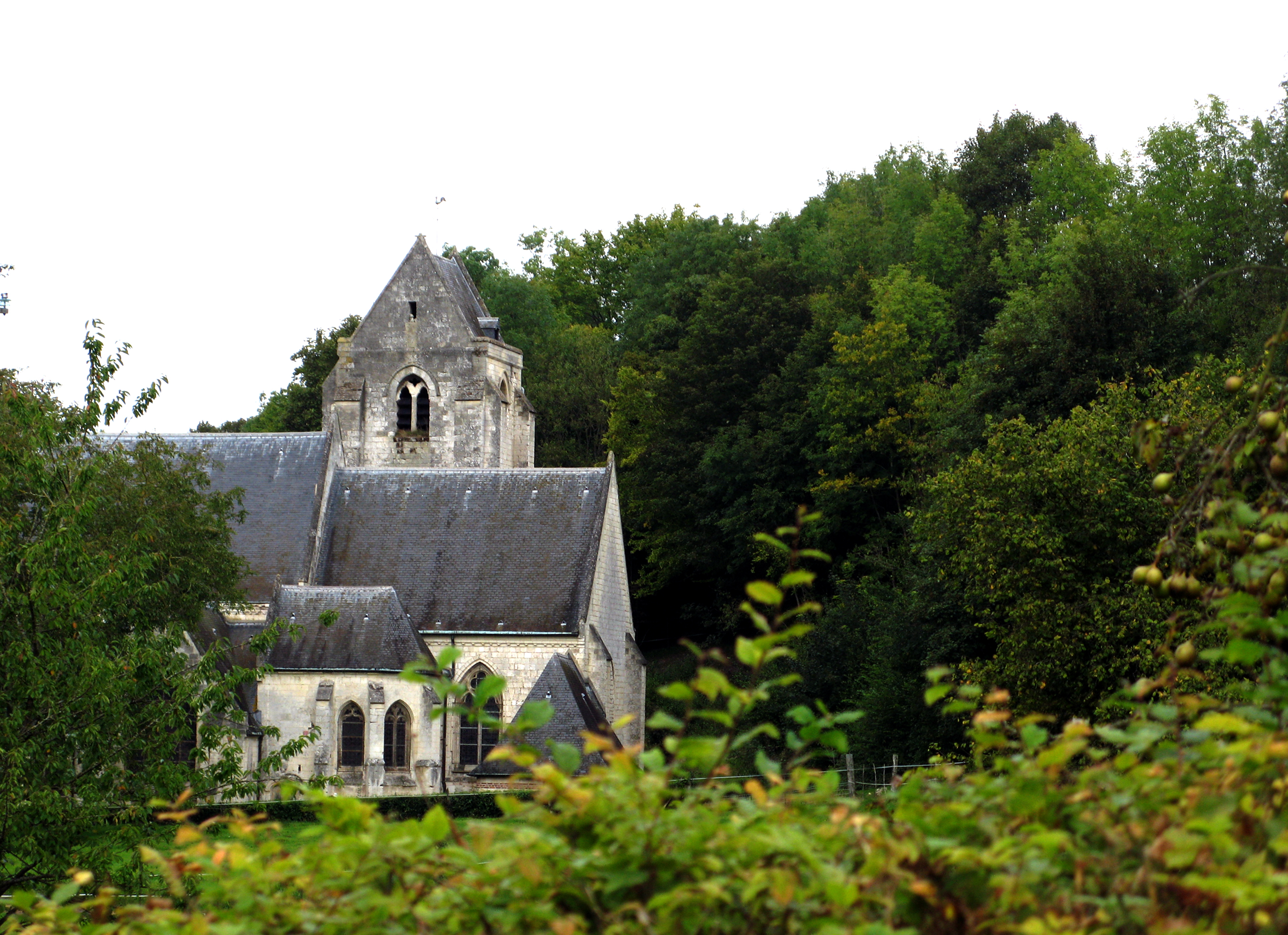
- The church in Fieffes
- Location of Fieffes-Montrelet
- Location within France Location within Hauts-de-France
- Coordinates: 50°05′12″N 2°13′51″E
- Country: France
- Region: Hauts-de-France
- Department: Somme
- Arrondissement: Amiens
- Canton: Doullens
- Intercommunality: CC Territoire Nord Picardie

Government
  - Mayor (2020–2026): Xavier Varlet
- Area^{1}: 9.68 km^{2} (3.74 sq mi)
- Elevation: 98 m (322 ft)
- Highest elevation: 147 m (482 ft)
- Lowest elevation: 63 m (207 ft)
- Population (2023): 339
  - Density: 35.0/km^{2} (90.7/sq mi)
- Time zone: UTC+01:00 (CET)
  - Summer (DST): UTC+02:00 (CEST)
- INSEE/Postal code: 80566 /80670
- ^{1} French Land Register data, which excludes lakes, ponds, glaciers > 1 km^{2} (0.386 sq mi or 247 acres) and river estuaries.

Fieffes-Montrelet (Picard: Fièfe-Montèrlet) is a commune in the Somme department in Hauts-de-France in northern France.

== Geography ==
The commune is situated on the D49 road, some 20 miles (32 km) east of Abbeville.

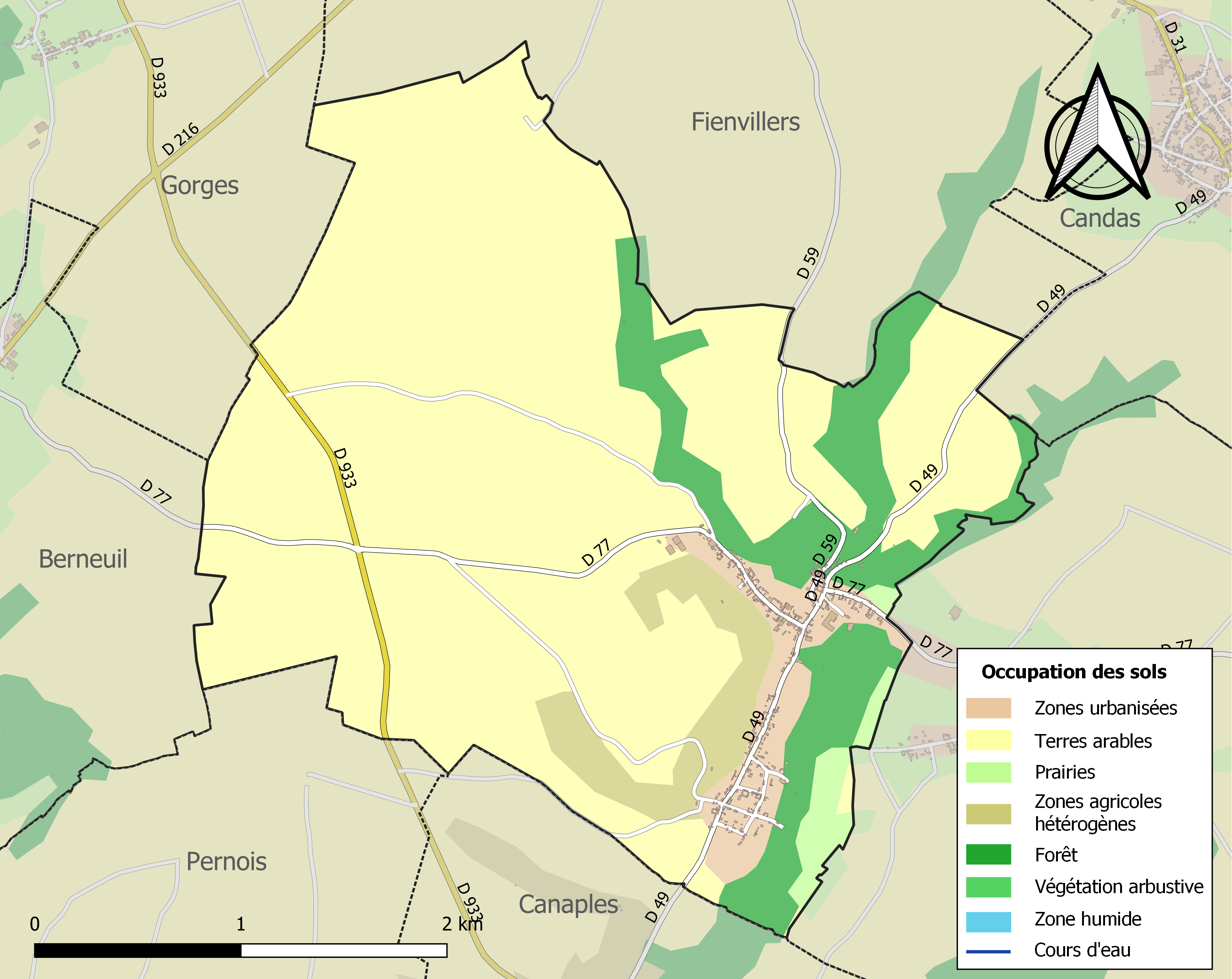
Fieffes and Montrelet.

== History ==
In 1975, the two communes of Fieffes and Montrelet were united to create a single administrative entity.

== Population ==
Historical population
Year	Pop.	±% p.a.
1968	306	—
1975	274	−1.57%
1982	279	+0.26%
1990	291	+0.53%
1999	299	+0.30%
2007	317	+0.73%
2012	329	+0.75%
2017	327	−0.12%
2023	339	+0.60%
Source: INSEE

== Places of interest ==
- Fieffes church

The church of Saint-Pierre is in the Romanesque style. The altar has recently (2007) been restored at a cost of €7500

- Montrelet church

Surrounded by the graveyard, it is unusually aligned with the river and in a high position.

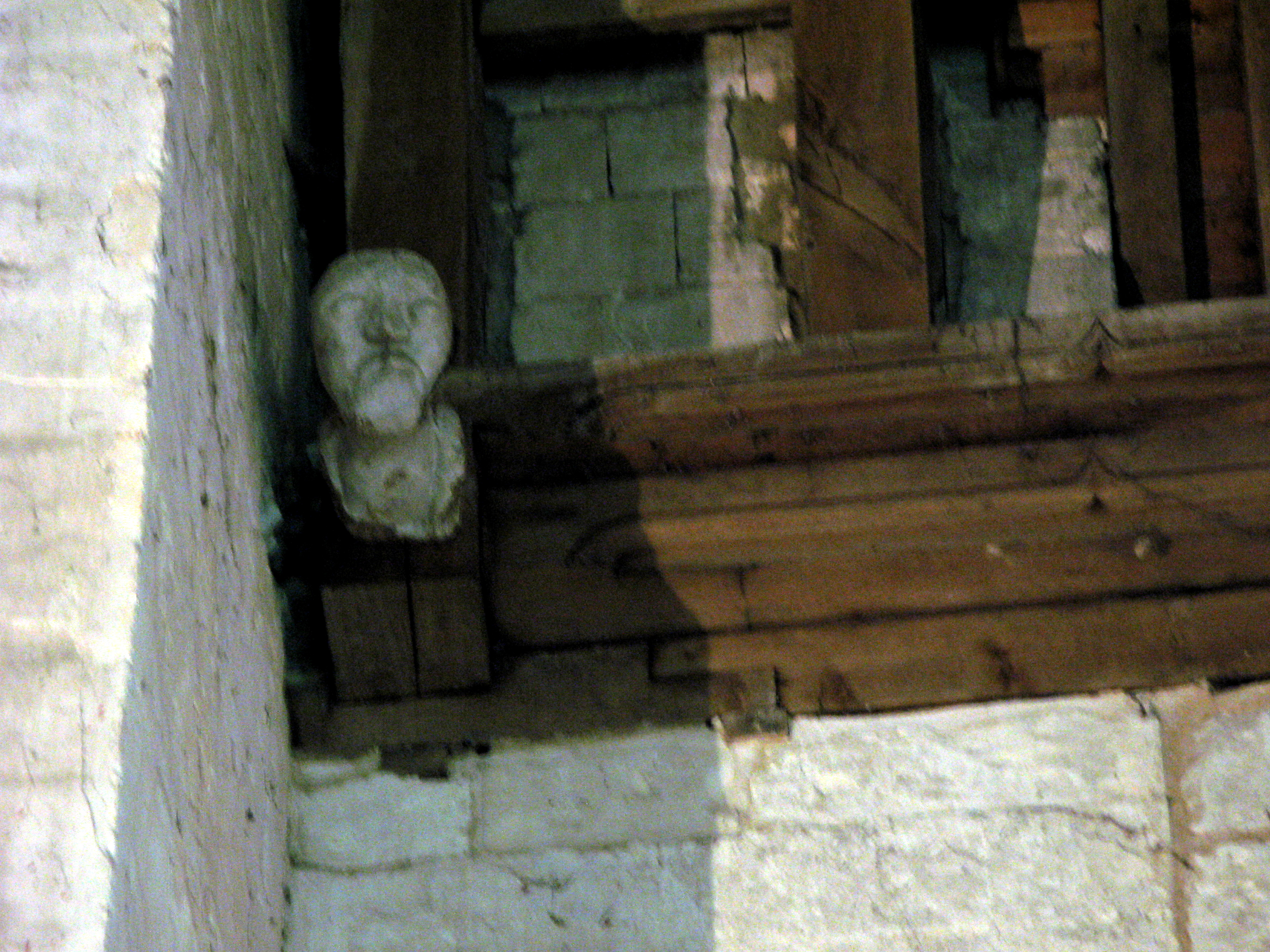
Wooden supports at Fieffes

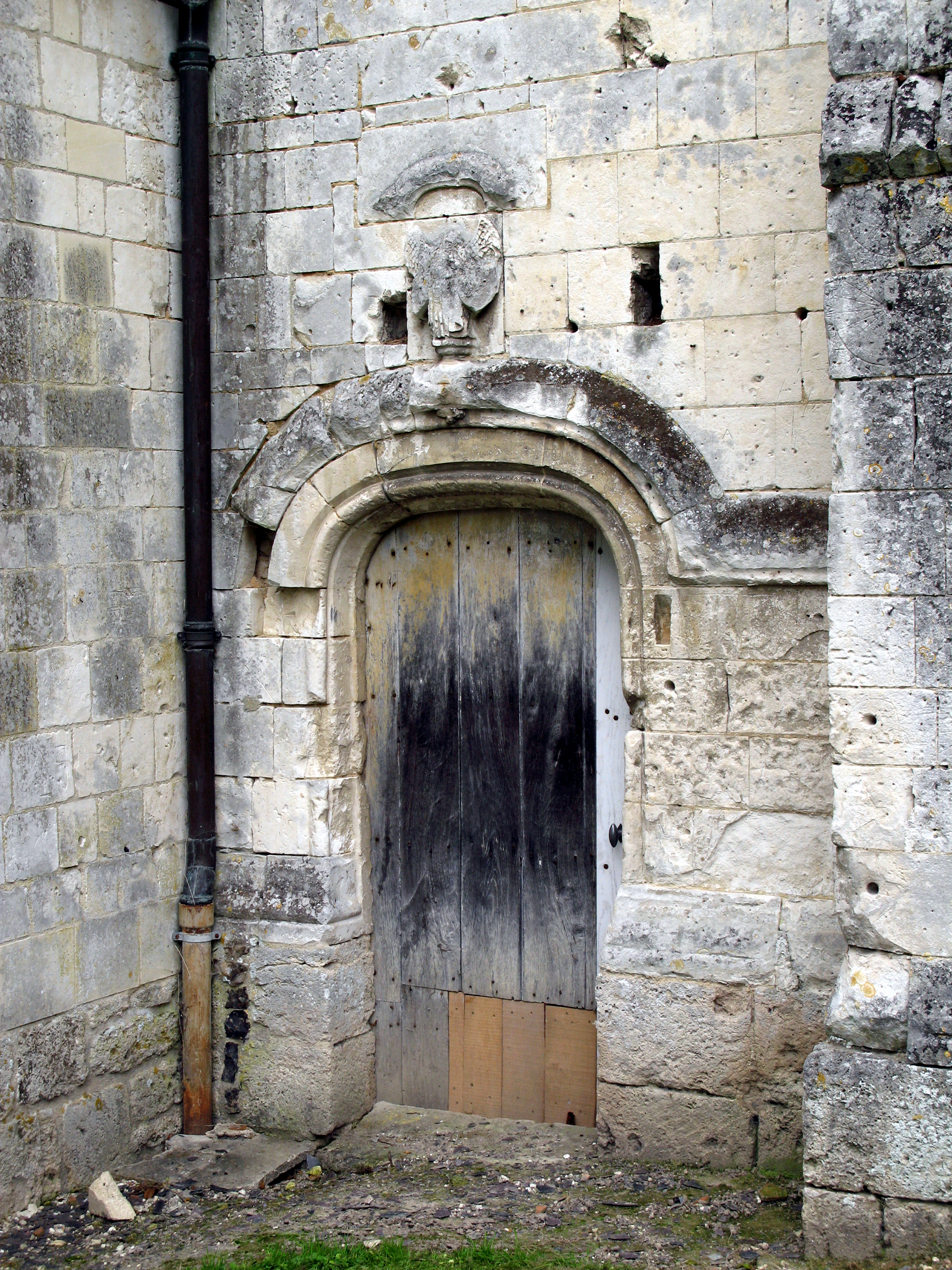
The south gate at Fieffes

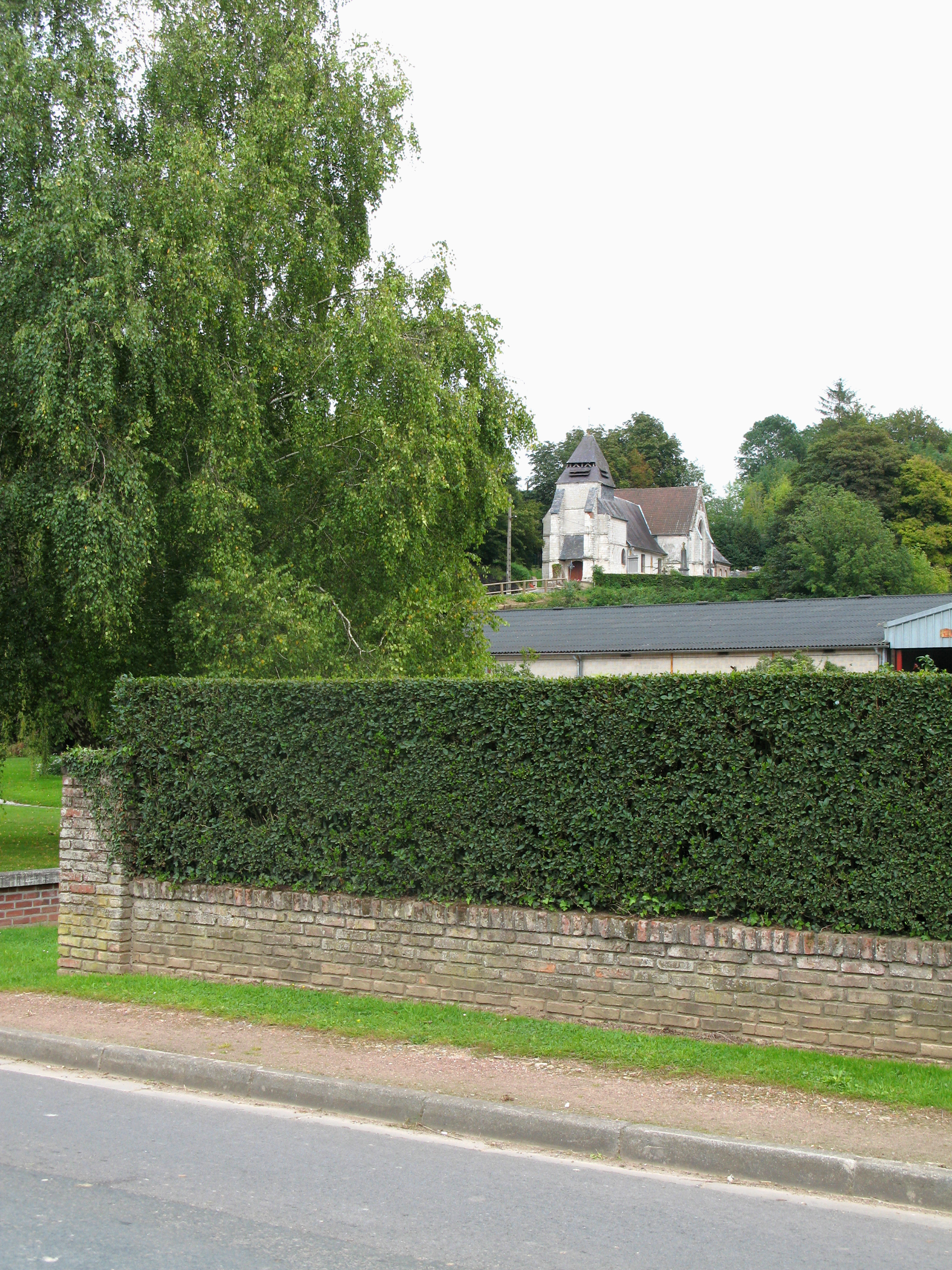
Montrelet church

== See also ==
- Communes of the Somme department
