= Canton of Ault =

Coordinates: 50°6′7″N 1°26′58″E

Ault
- Former canton
- Interactive map of Ault
- Country: France
- Region: Hauts-de-France
- Department: Somme
- No. of communes: {{{nbcomm}}}
- Disbanded: 2015
- Area: 57.33 km^{2} (22.14 sq mi)
- Population (2012): 10,193
  - Density: 177.8/km^{2} (460.5/sq mi)

The Canton of Ault is a former canton situated in the department of the Somme and in the Picardie region of northern France. It was disbanded following the French canton reorganisation which came into effect in March 2015. It consisted of 10 communes, which joined the canton of Friville-Escarbotin in 2015. It had 10,193 inhabitants (2012).

== Geography ==
The canton was organised around the commune of Ault in the arrondissement of Abbeville. The altitude varies from 0m at Ault to 127m at Yzengremer for an average of 70m.

The canton comprised 10 communes:

- Allenay
- Ault
- Béthencourt-sur-Mer
- Friaucourt
- Méneslies
- Mers-les-Bains
- Oust-Marest
- Saint-Quentin-la-Motte-Croix-au-Bailly
- Woignarue
- Yzengremer

== Population ==
Population Growth
1962	1968	1975	1982	1990	1999
11050	11562	12532	11640	11069	10984
Census count starting from 1962 : Population without double counting

== See also ==
- Arrondissements of the Somme department
- Cantons of the Somme department
- Communes of the Somme department
