= Vaudricourt =

Vaudricourt may refer to two communes in France:

- Vaudricourt, Pas-de-Calais
- Vaudricourt, Somme
