= Friville-Escarbotin =

- Commune
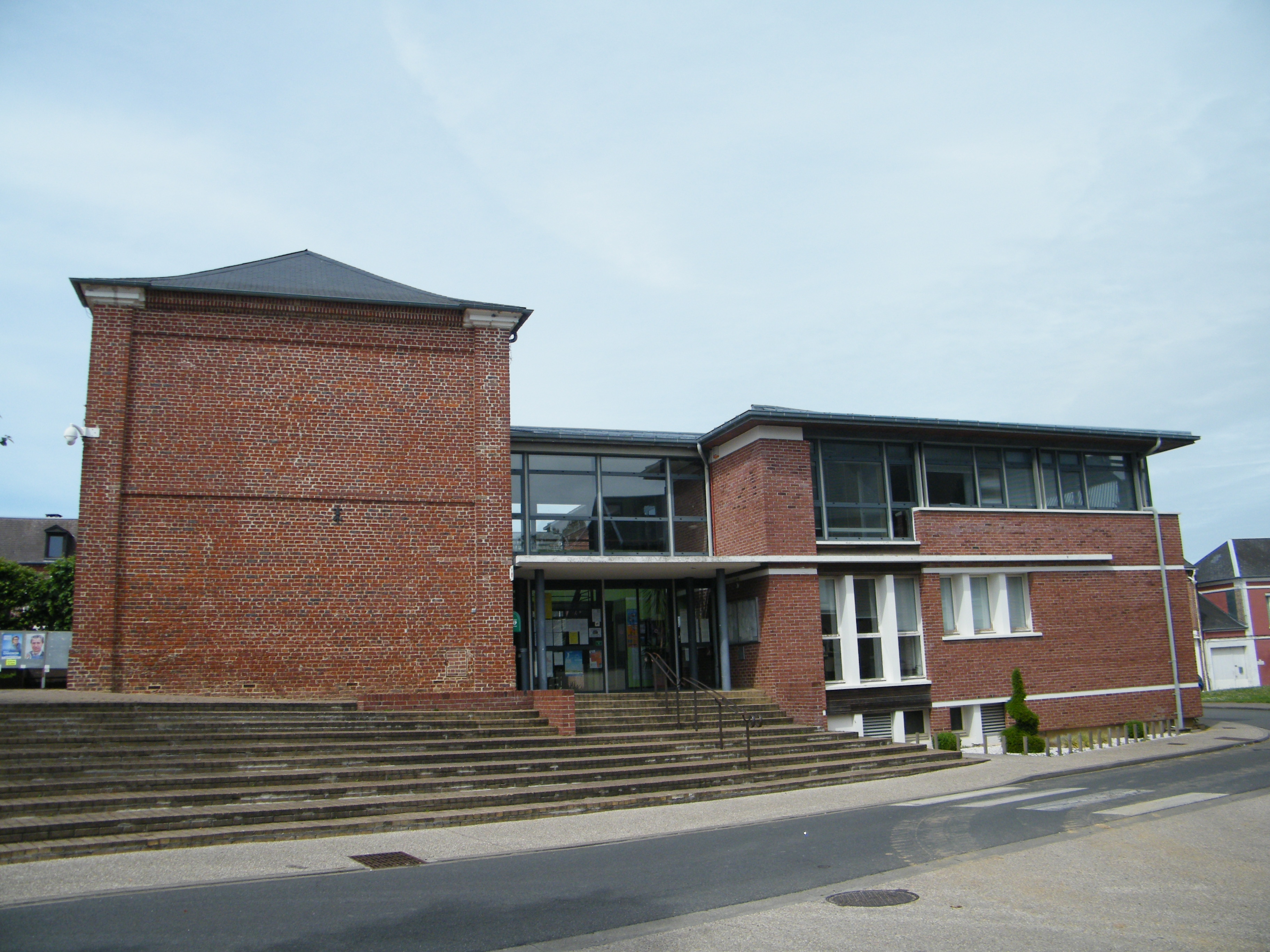
- The town hall in Friville-Escarbotin

- Coat of arms
- Location of Friville-Escarbotin
- Location within France Location within Hauts-de-France
- Coordinates: 50°05′29″N 1°33′02″E
- Country: France
- Region: Hauts-de-France
- Department: Somme
- Arrondissement: Abbeville
- Canton: Friville-Escarbotin
- Intercommunality: CC Vimeu

Government
  - Mayor (2020–2026): Nicole Morel
- Area^{1}: 8.86 km^{2} (3.42 sq mi)
- Elevation: 95 m (312 ft)
- Highest elevation: 112 m (367 ft)
- Lowest elevation: 55 m (180 ft)
- Population (2023): 4,306
  - Density: 486/km^{2} (1,260/sq mi)
- Time zone: UTC+01:00 (CET)
  - Summer (DST): UTC+02:00 (CEST)
- INSEE/Postal code: 80368 /80130
- ^{1} French Land Register data, which excludes lakes, ponds, glaciers > 1 km^{2} (0.386 sq mi or 247 acres) and river estuaries.

Friville-Escarbotin (French pronunciation: [fʁivil ɛskaʁbɔˈtɛ̃]; Picard: Freuvile-Ésquérbotin) ) is a commune in the Somme department in Hauts-de-France in northern France.

== Geography ==
The commune is situated on the D2 and D229 crossroads, 21 kilometres (13 mi) west of Abbeville.

== Monuments ==
The monument aux morts in this commune features sculptural work by Albert-Dominique Roze. A montage of photographs of this work is shown below.

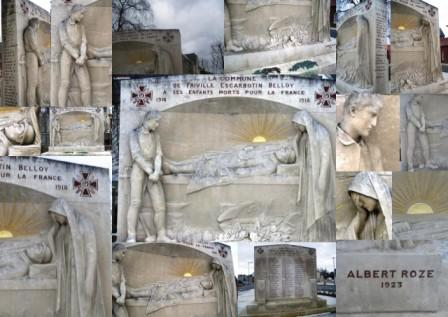
A montage of photographs of the monument aux morts at Friville-Escarbotin

== Population ==
Historical population
Year	Pop.	±% p.a.
1968	4,363	—
1975	4,693	+1.05%
1982	4,844	+0.45%
1990	4,737	−0.28%
1999	4,646	−0.22%
2007	4,518	−0.35%
2012	4,661	+0.63%
2017	4,569	−0.40%
2023	4,306	−0.98%
Source: INSEE

== See also ==
- Communes of the Somme department
- War memorials (Western Somme)
