= Woincourt =

- Commune
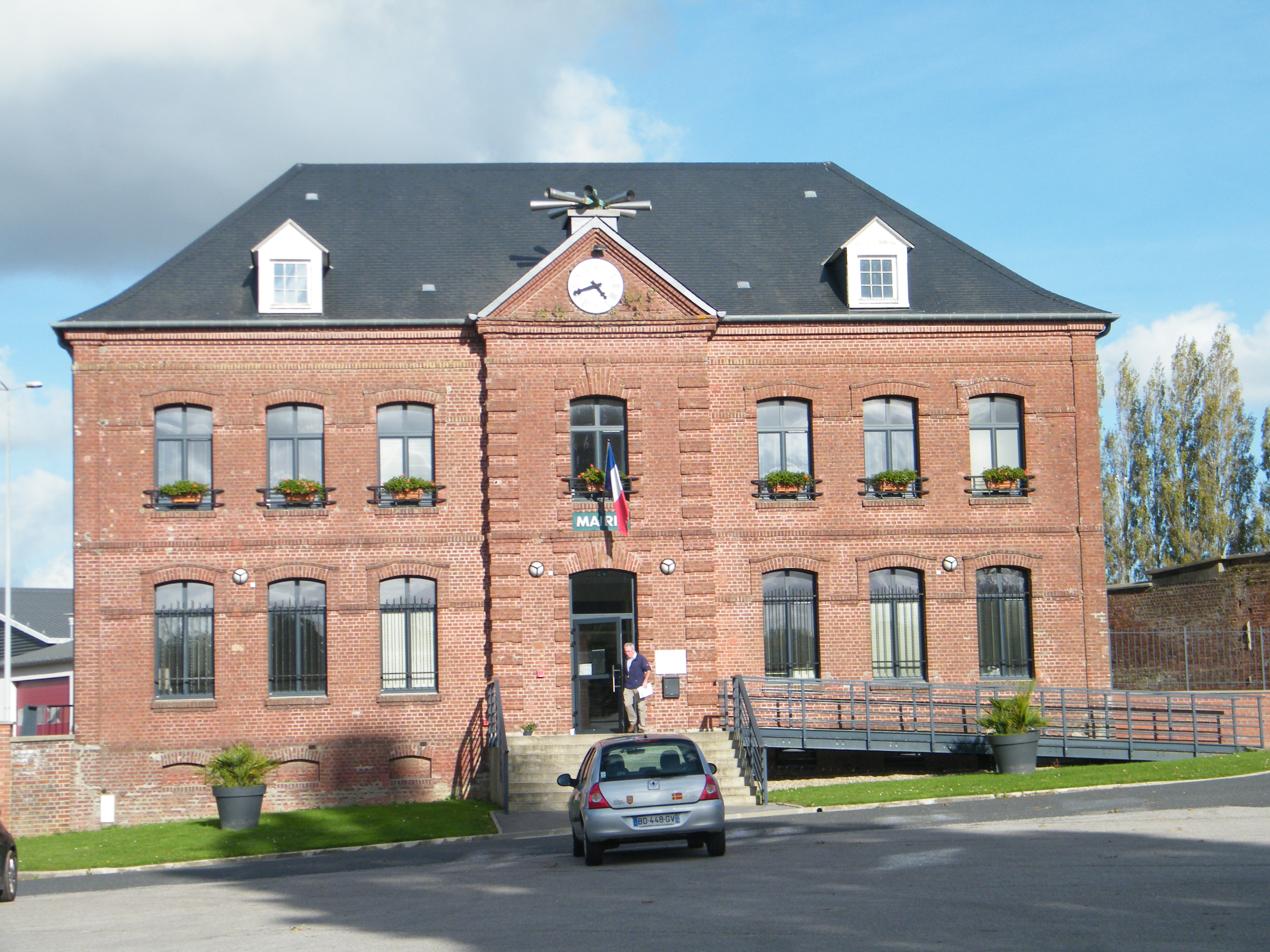
- The town hall in Woincourt
- Location of Woincourt
- Location within France Location within Hauts-de-France
- Coordinates: 50°04′01″N 1°32′18″E
- Country: France
- Region: Hauts-de-France
- Department: Somme
- Arrondissement: Abbeville
- Canton: Friville-Escarbotin
- Intercommunality: Vimeu

Government
  - Mayor (2020–2026): Arnaud Petit
- Area^{1}: 4.18 km^{2} (1.61 sq mi)
- Elevation: 99 m (325 ft)
- Highest elevation: 129 m (423 ft)
- Lowest elevation: 80 m (260 ft)
- Population (2023): 1,302
  - Density: 311/km^{2} (807/sq mi)
- Time zone: UTC+01:00 (CET)
  - Summer (DST): UTC+02:00 (CEST)
- INSEE/Postal code: 80827 /80520
- ^{1} French Land Register data, which excludes lakes, ponds, glaciers > 1 km^{2} (0.386 sq mi or 247 acres) and river estuaries.

Woincourt (French pronunciation: [wɛ̃kuʁ]) is a commune in the Somme department in Hauts-de-France in northern France. Since 13 February 2020, the commune has been a part of the newly created regional natural park of Baie de Somme - Picardie maritime.

== Toponymy ==
Since 1100, the latinized form of Dominica curtis was listed in The Miracles of Saint Angilbert. The name "Waincort" appeared in a 1223 cartulary of Fouilloy, Somme. A 1301 pouillé, a type of ecclesiastical enumeration of a given geographical area, listed the name of the village as "Waincourt". "Wincourt" was cited in 1468, and finally local custom demonstrates use of "Woincourt" beginning in 1507.

== Geography ==
Woincourt is situated 15 miles(24 km) southwest of Abbeville, at the D2 and D1925 crossroads. The village can be accessed via the A16 autoroute (Paris-Dunkirk) or the A28 autoroute (Abbeville-Rouen).

== History ==
The area once had significant manufacturing, including a locksmith and a rifle factory. Long dependent on the Abbey of Saint-Riquier, Woincourt eventually changed to the hospice of Abbeville. The Saint-Martin church, dating from the 17th century, is located in Woincourt, as well as a monument to the local victims of World War I.

== Population ==
Historical population
Year	Pop.	±% p.a.
1968	1,451	—
1975	1,541	+0.86%
1982	1,511	−0.28%
1990	1,511	+0.00%
1999	1,531	+0.15%
2007	1,453	−0.65%
2012	1,388	−0.91%
2017	1,268	−1.79%
2023	1,302	+0.44%
Source: INSEE

== See also ==
- Communes of the Somme department
