= Brutelles =

- Commune
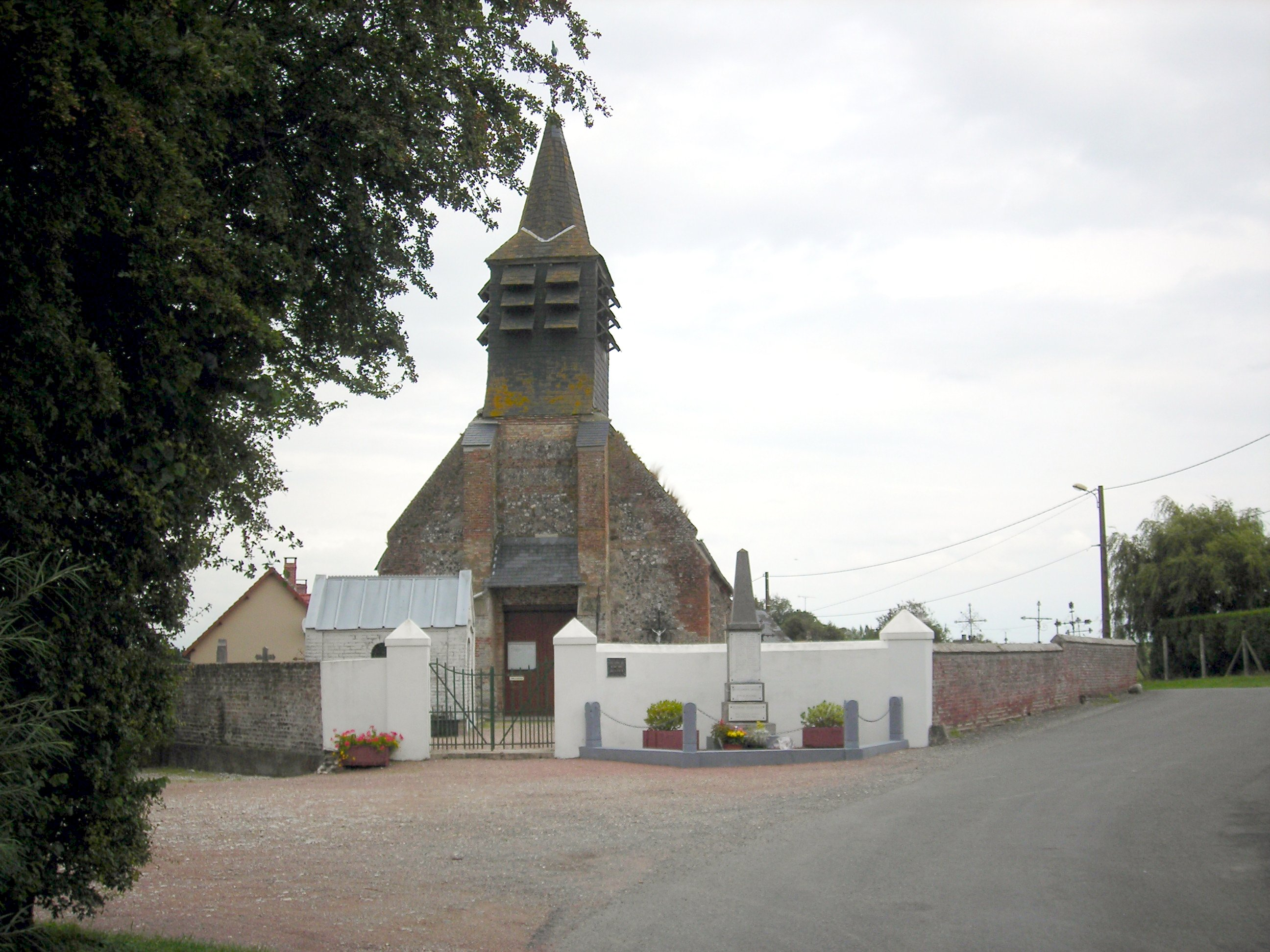
- The church in Brutelles
- Location of Brutelles
- Location within France Location within Hauts-de-France
- Coordinates: 50°08′30″N 1°31′21″E
- Country: France
- Region: Hauts-de-France
- Department: Somme
- Arrondissement: Abbeville
- Canton: Friville-Escarbotin
- Intercommunality: CA Baie de Somme

Government
  - Mayor (2020–2026): Françoise Maison
- Area^{1}: 6.29 km^{2} (2.43 sq mi)
- Elevation: 13 m (43 ft)
- Highest elevation: 59 m (194 ft)
- Lowest elevation: 3 m (9.8 ft)
- Population (2023): 197
  - Density: 31.3/km^{2} (81.1/sq mi)
- Time zone: UTC+01:00 (CET)
  - Summer (DST): UTC+02:00 (CEST)
- INSEE/Postal code: 80146 /80230
- ^{1} French Land Register data, which excludes lakes, ponds, glaciers > 1 km^{2} (0.386 sq mi or 247 acres) and river estuaries.

Brutelles (French pronunciation: [bʁytɛl]) is a commune in the Somme department in Hauts-de-France in northern France.

== Geography ==
Brutelles is situated on the D940 road, some 11 miles (18 km) west of Abbeville.

== Population ==
Historical population
Year	Pop.	±% p.a.
1968	189	—
1975	164	−2.01%
1982	183	+1.58%
1990	200	+1.12%
1999	179	−1.23%
2007	189	+0.68%
2012	184	−0.53%
2017	207	+2.38%
2023	197	−0.82%
Source: INSEE

== Places of interest ==
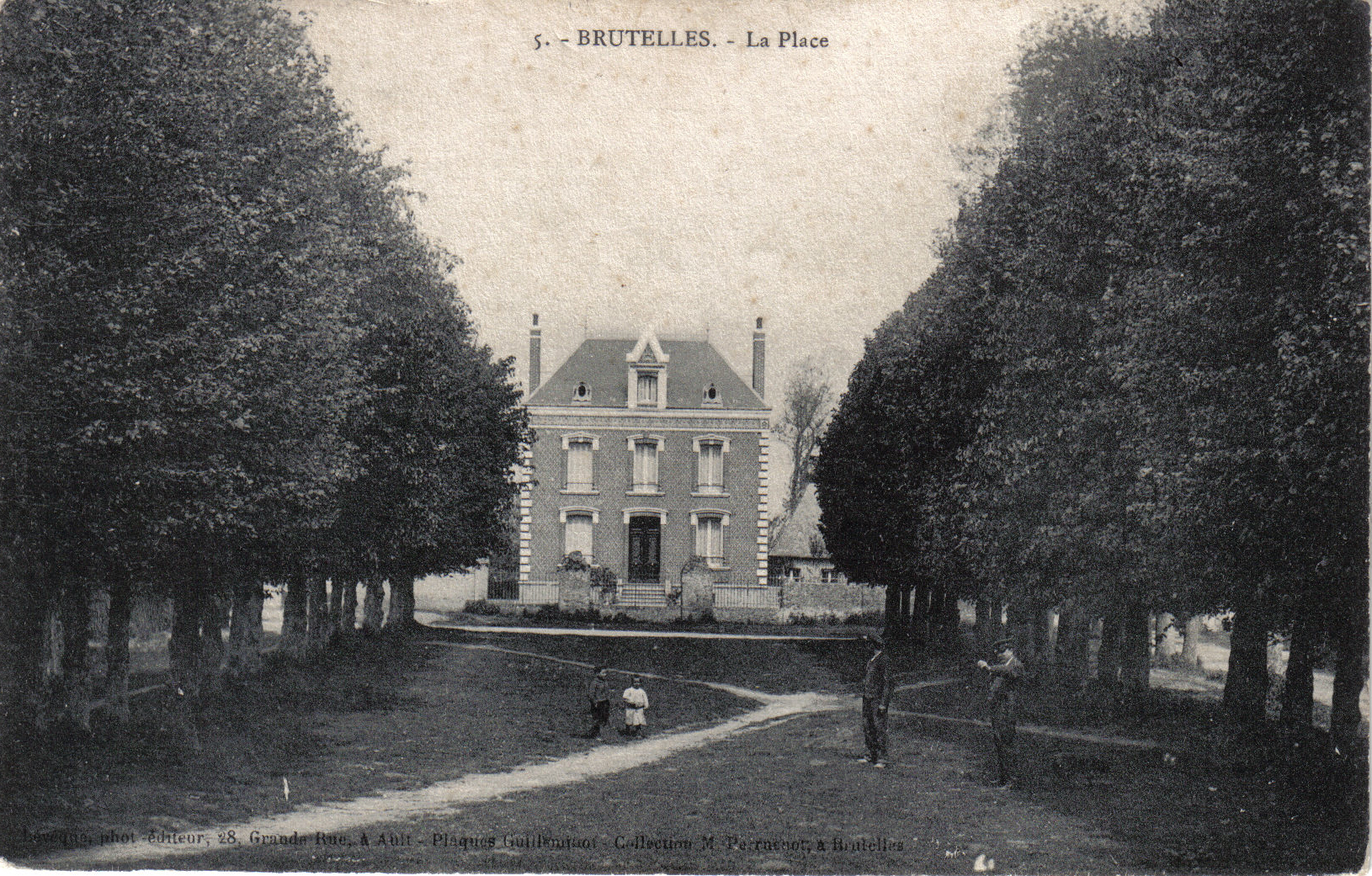
Old postcard of Brutelles town square

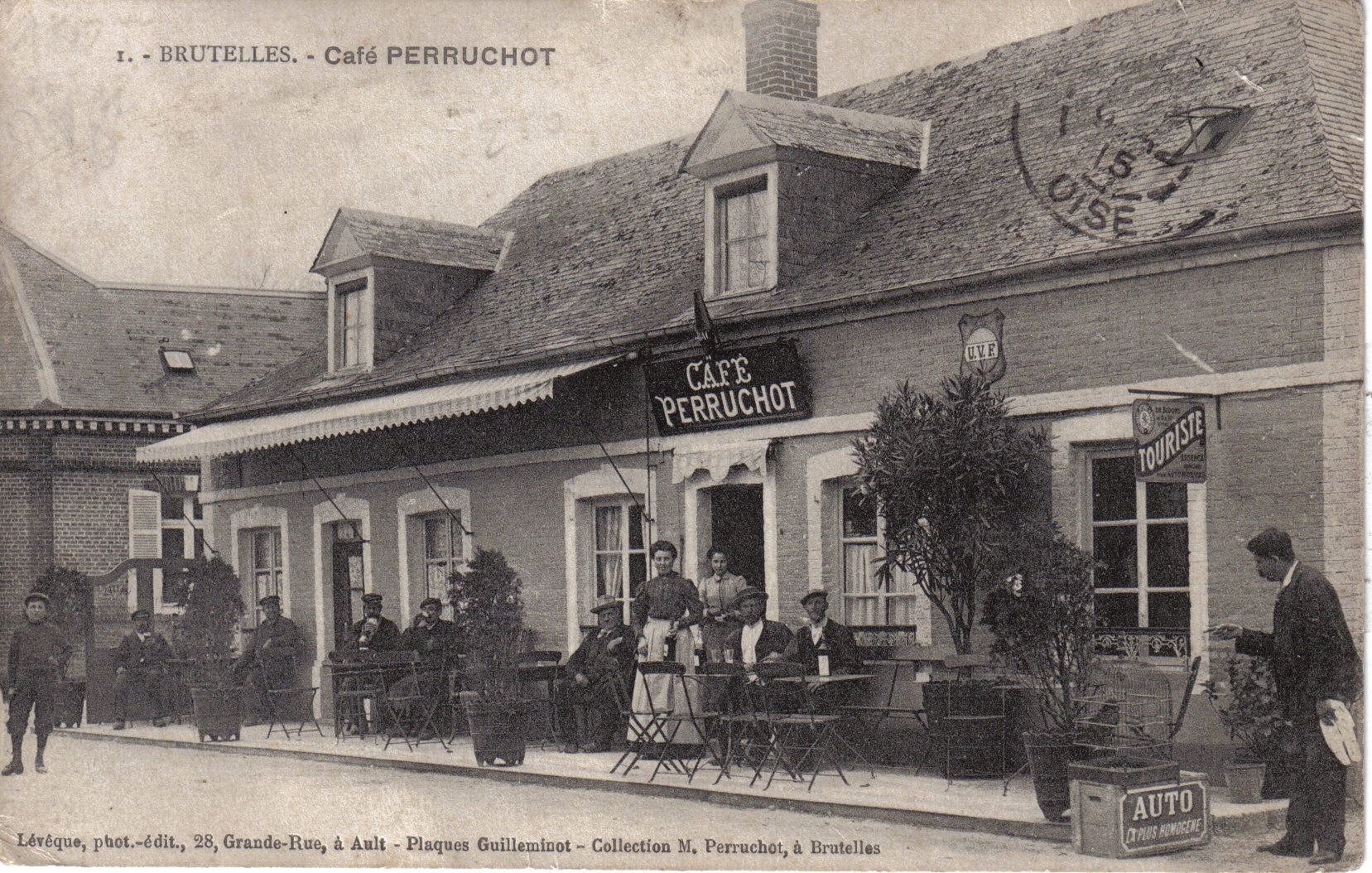
Old postcard of a Brutelles café

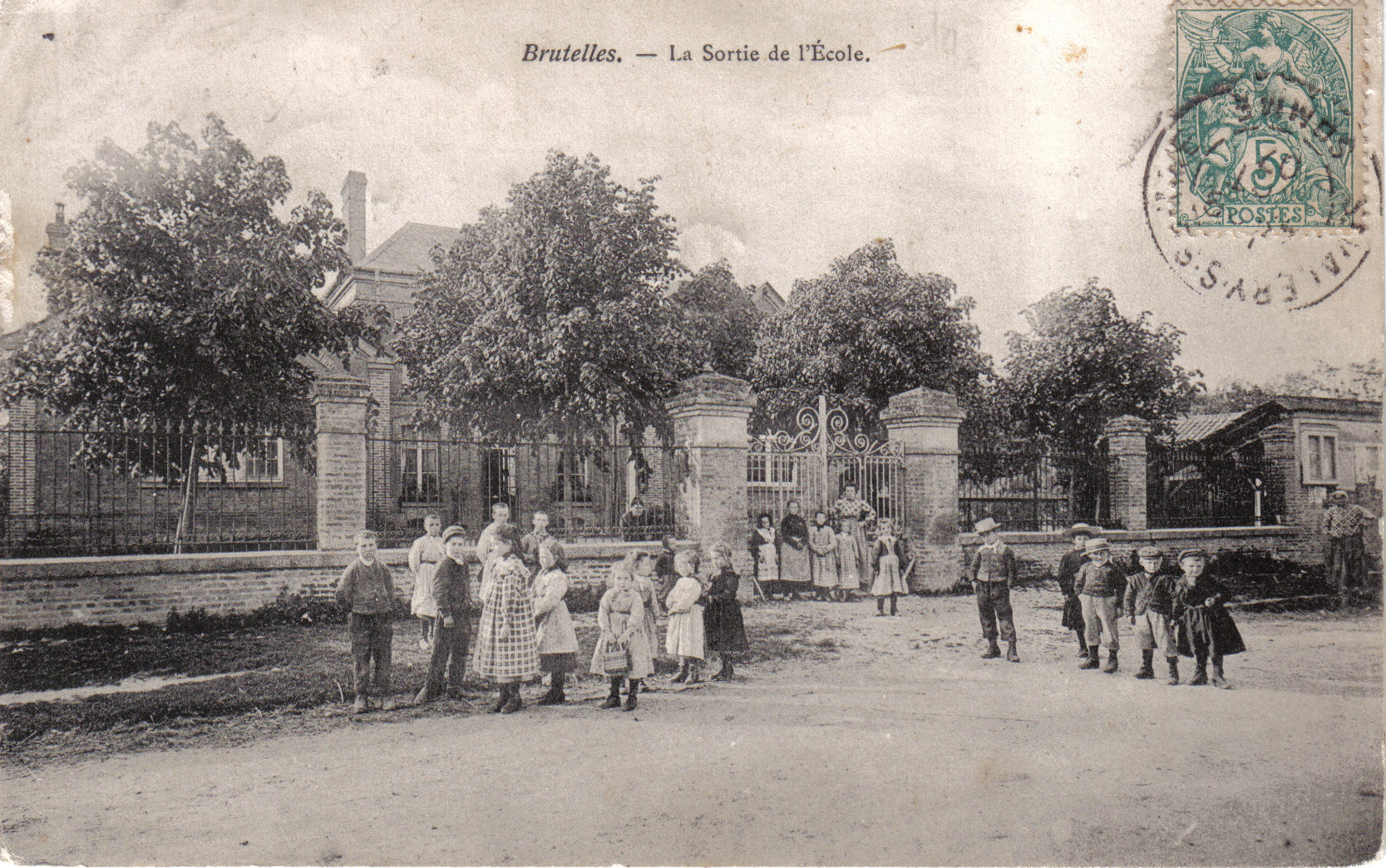
Old postcard of the school in Brutelles

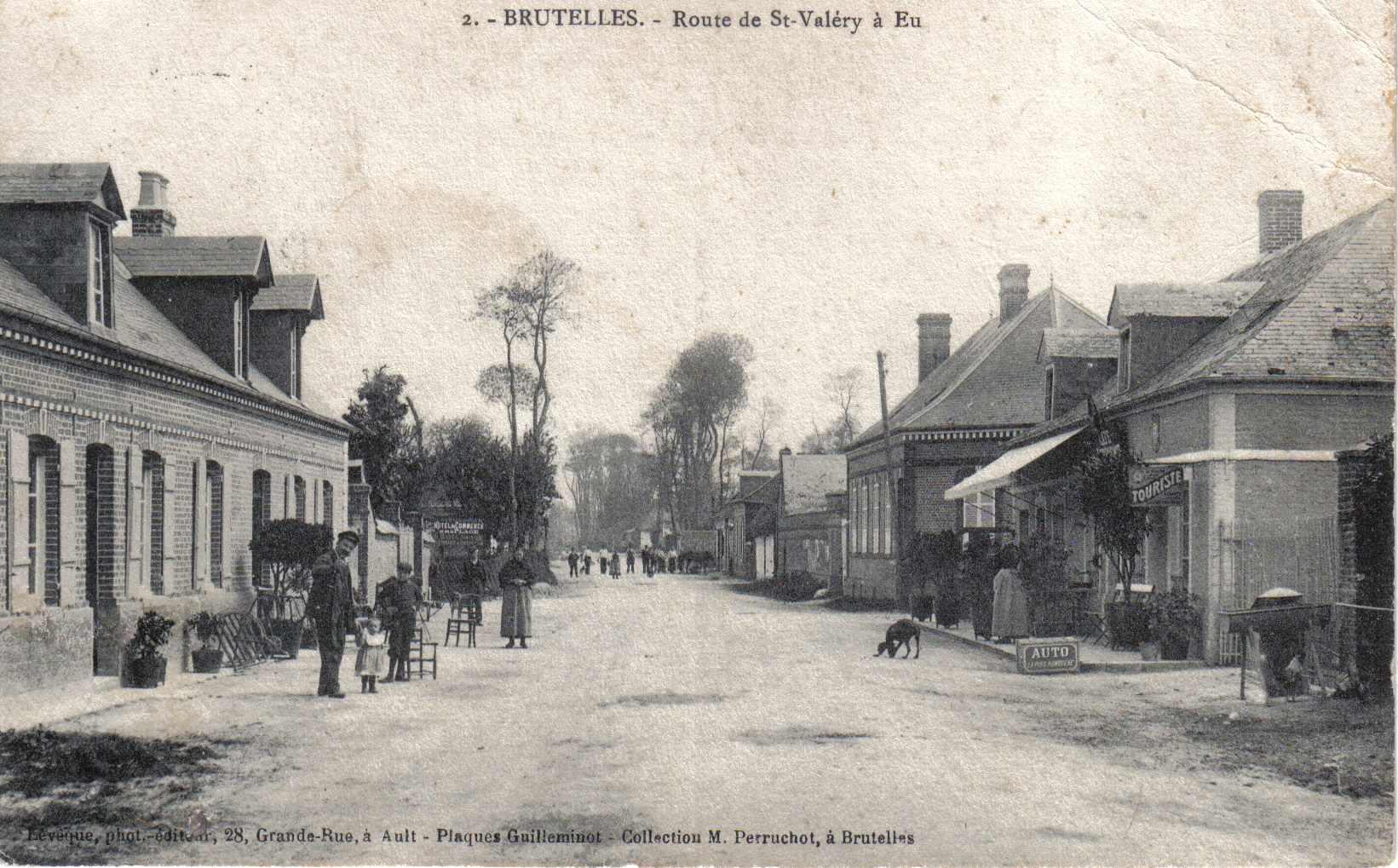
Old postcard of Route de St Valery à Eu

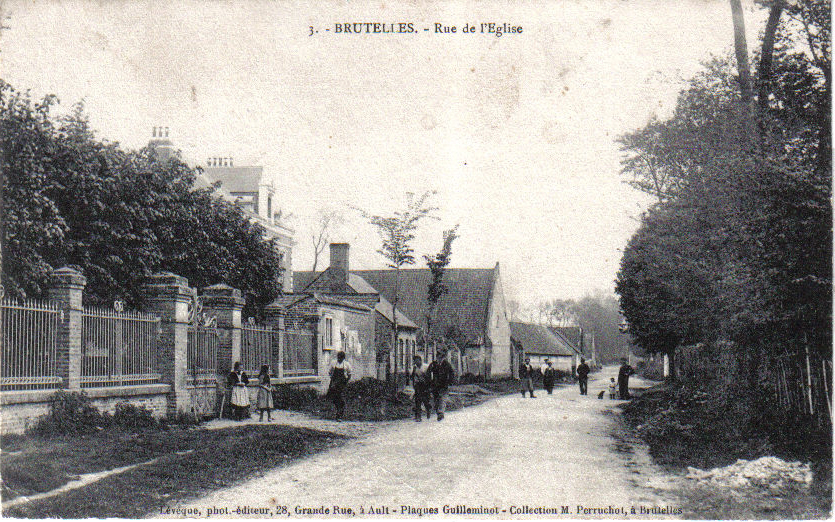
Church Street in Brutelles

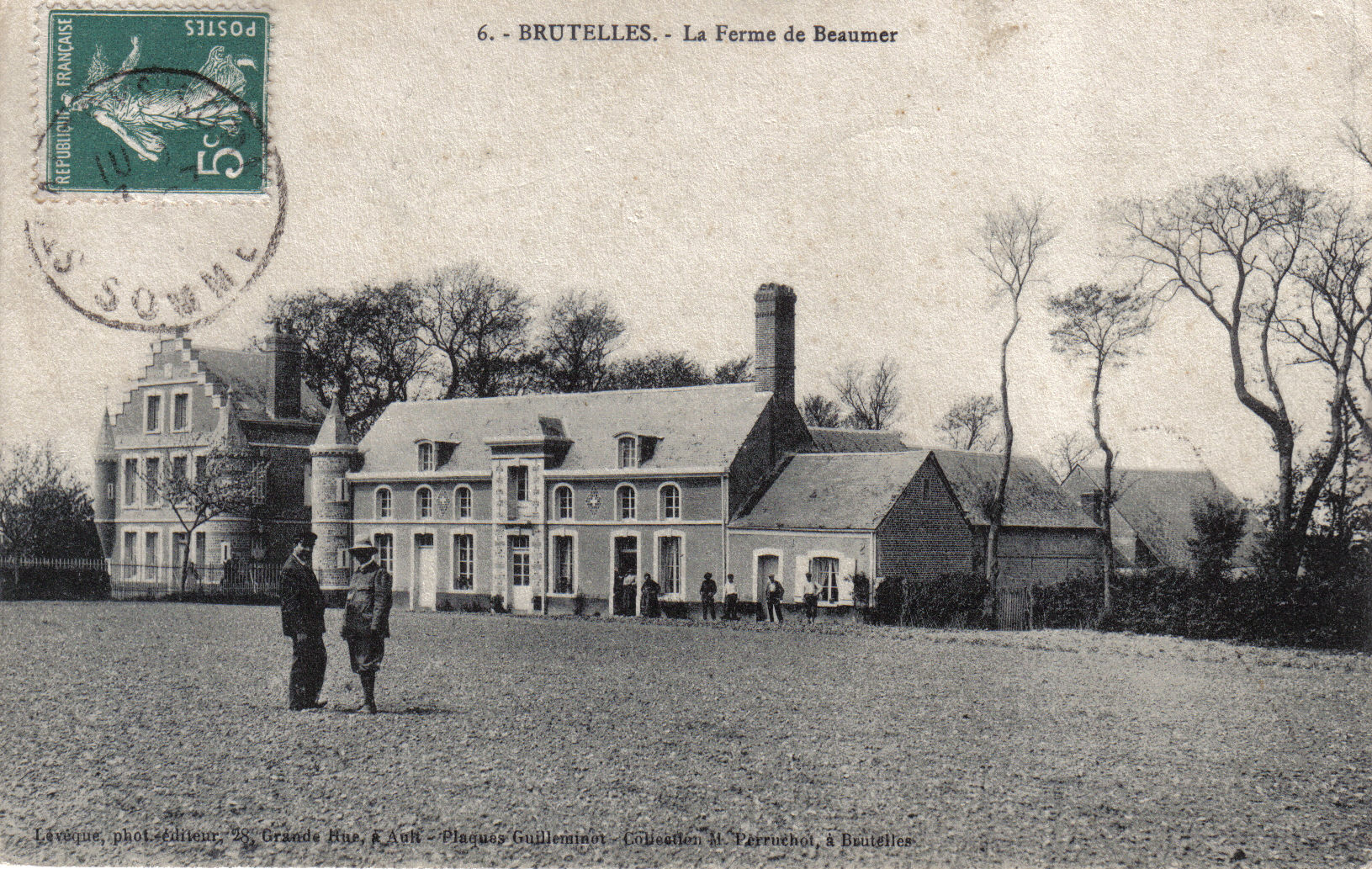
Old postcard of Beaumer Farm, between Hautebut and Brutelles

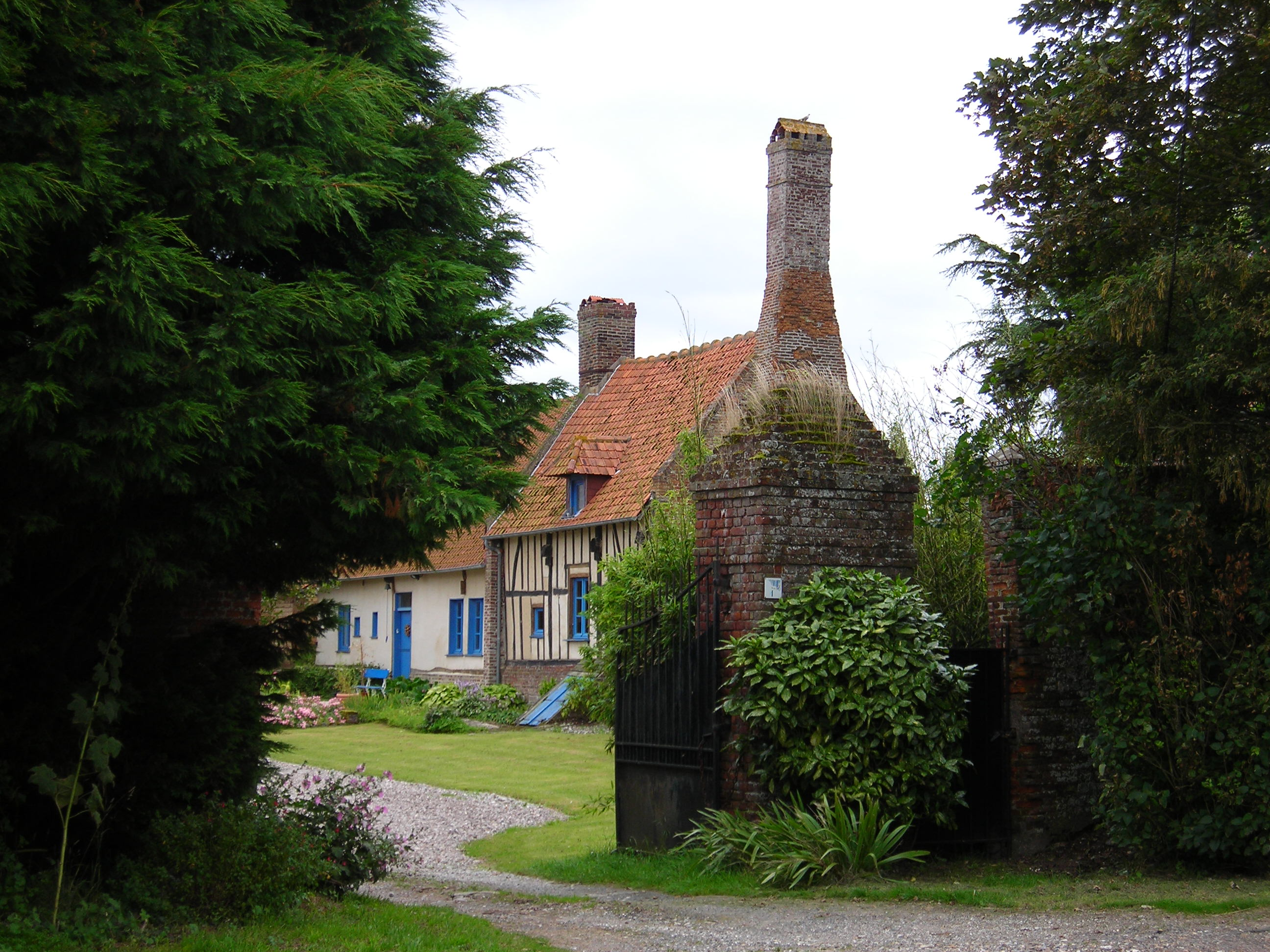
Recent photograph of the old farm at Hamel

== See also ==
- Communes of the Somme department
