= Fressenneville =

- Commune
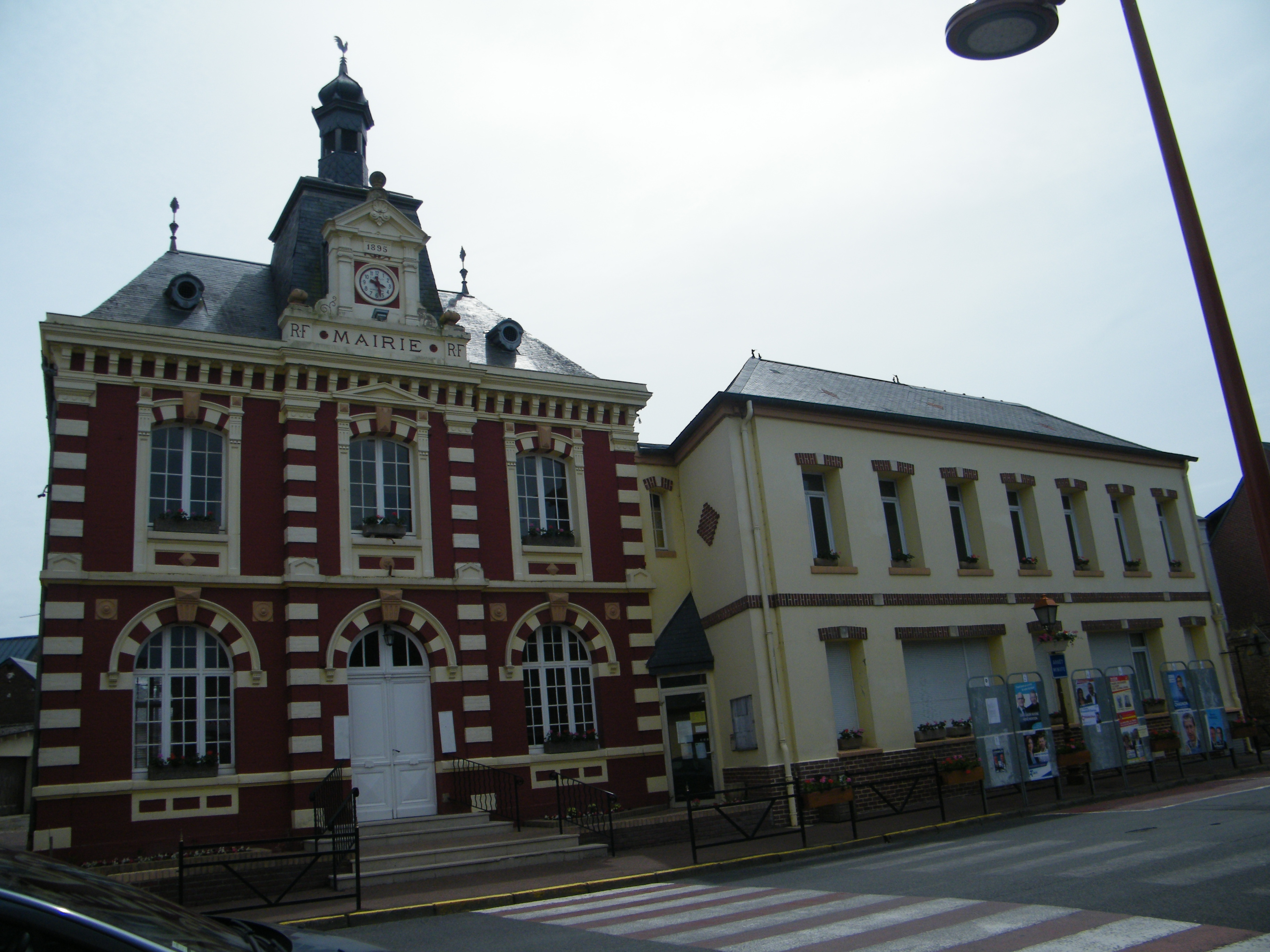
- The town hall in Fressenneville

- Coat of arms
- Location of Fressenneville
- Location within France Location within Hauts-de-France
- Coordinates: 50°04′07″N 1°34′41″E
- Country: France
- Region: Hauts-de-France
- Department: Somme
- Arrondissement: Abbeville
- Canton: Friville-Escarbotin
- Intercommunality: CC Vimeu

Government
  - Mayor (2020–2026): Jean-Jacques Leleu
- Area^{1}: 8.66 km^{2} (3.34 sq mi)
- Elevation: 92 m (302 ft)
- Highest elevation: 129 m (423 ft)
- Lowest elevation: 63 m (207 ft)
- Population (2023): 2,045
  - Density: 236/km^{2} (612/sq mi)
- Time zone: UTC+01:00 (CET)
  - Summer (DST): UTC+02:00 (CEST)
- INSEE/Postal code: 80360 /80390
- ^{1} French Land Register data, which excludes lakes, ponds, glaciers > 1 km^{2} (0.386 sq mi or 247 acres) and river estuaries.

Fressenneville (French pronunciation: [fʁɛsɛnvil]) is a commune in the Somme department in Hauts-de-France in northern France.

== Geography ==
Fressenneville is situated on the intersection of the D925 and D229 road, some 13 miles (21 km) southwest of Abbeville.

== Population ==
Historical population
Year	Pop.	±% p.a.
1968	2,342	—
1975	2,594	+1.47%
1982	2,487	−0.60%
1990	2,422	−0.33%
1999	2,334	−0.41%
2007	2,257	−0.42%
2012	2,254	−0.03%
2017	2,207	−0.42%
2023	2,045	−1.26%
Source: INSEE

== See also ==
- Communes of the Somme department
