= Saint-Blimont =

- Commune
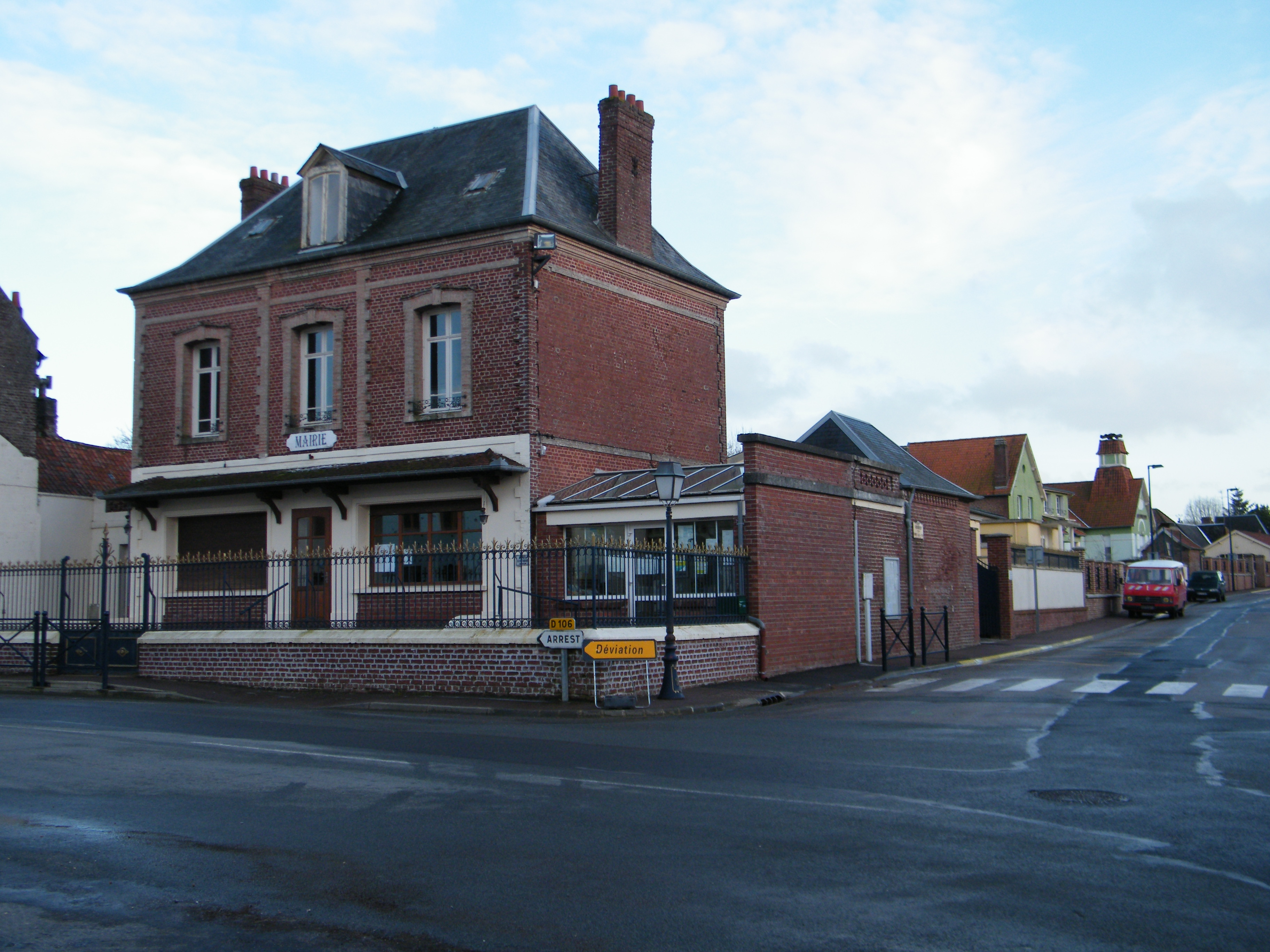
- The town hall and school in Saint-Blimont

- Coat of arms
- Location of Saint-Blimont
- Location within France Location within Hauts-de-France
- Coordinates: 50°07′18″N 1°34′30″E
- Country: France
- Region: Hauts-de-France
- Department: Somme
- Arrondissement: Abbeville
- Canton: Friville-Escarbotin
- Intercommunality: CA Baie de Somme

Government
  - Mayor (2020–2026): José Marque
- Area^{1}: 6.63 km^{2} (2.56 sq mi)
- Elevation: 27 m (89 ft)
- Highest elevation: 67 m (220 ft)
- Lowest elevation: 18 m (59 ft)
- Population (2023): 883
  - Density: 133/km^{2} (345/sq mi)
- Time zone: UTC+01:00 (CET)
  - Summer (DST): UTC+02:00 (CEST)
- INSEE/Postal code: 80700 /80960
- ^{1} French Land Register data, which excludes lakes, ponds, glaciers > 1 km^{2} (0.386 sq mi or 247 acres) and river estuaries.

Saint-Blimont (French pronunciation: [sɛ̃ blimɔ̃]) is a commune in the Somme department in Hauts-de-France in northern France.

== Geography ==
The commune is situated 12 miles (19 km) west of Abbeville, on the D106 road. Sitting squarely between the industrial Vimeu region and the tourist regions of Picardie.

== History ==
Closely linked with Saint-Valery-sur-Somme. The monk evangelist Saint Valery healed Blimond around 615, who succeeded him as head of the abbey at Saint-Valery-sur-Somme.

== Population ==
Historical population
Year	Pop.	±% p.a.
1968	958	—
1975	989	+0.46%
1982	1,056	+0.94%
1990	1,046	−0.12%
1999	948	−1.09%
2007	947	−0.01%
2012	936	−0.23%
2017	878	−1.27%
2023	883	+0.09%
Source: INSEE

== Places of interest ==
- The fifteenth century watchtower that has been a belltower for about 150 years. The tower is accessible in July and August, with guided visits every Saturday at 11 o'clock.
- The nineteenth century church, with interesting elements such as beams, a baptismal font originating from the previous sixteenth century church and a 15th-century statue of Saint Blimond.

== See also ==
- Communes of the Somme department
