= Bourseville =

- Commune
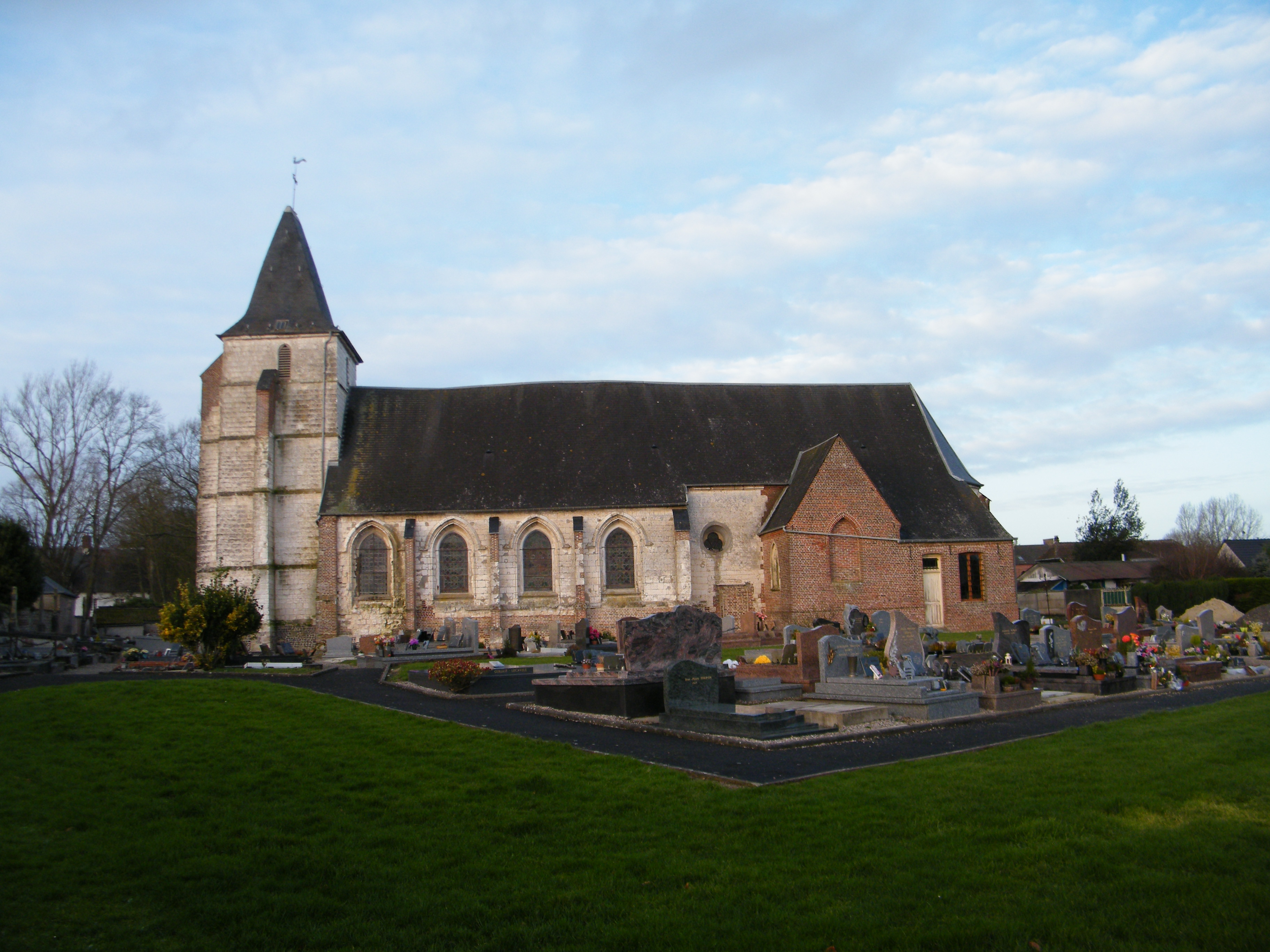
- The church in Bourseville

- Coat of arms
- Location of Bourseville
- Location within France Location within Hauts-de-France
- Coordinates: 50°06′19″N 1°31′27″E
- Country: France
- Region: Hauts-de-France
- Department: Somme
- Arrondissement: Abbeville
- Canton: Friville-Escarbotin
- Intercommunality: CC Vimeu

Government
  - Mayor (2020–2026): Yannick Caux
- Area^{1}: 8.07 km^{2} (3.12 sq mi)
- Elevation: 63 m (207 ft)
- Highest elevation: 97 m (318 ft)
- Lowest elevation: 33 m (108 ft)
- Population (2023): 725
  - Density: 89.8/km^{2} (233/sq mi)
- Time zone: UTC+01:00 (CET)
  - Summer (DST): UTC+02:00 (CEST)
- INSEE/Postal code: 80124 /80130
- ^{1} French Land Register data, which excludes lakes, ponds, glaciers > 1 km^{2} (0.386 sq mi or 247 acres) and river estuaries.

Bourseville (French pronunciation: [buʁsəvil]; Picard: Borséville) is a commune in the Somme department in Hauts-de-France in northern France.

== Geography ==
Bourseville is situated on the D102 and D63 road junction, some 16 miles (26 km) west of Abbeville.

== Population ==
Historical population

Year	Pop.	±% p.a.
1793	633	—
1891	751	+0.17%
1962	644	−0.22%
1968	705	+1.52%
1975	783	+1.51%
1982	808	+0.45%

Year	Pop.	±% p.a.
1990	780	−0.44%
1999	774	−0.09%
2007	719	−0.92%
2012	719	+0.00%
2017	699	−0.56%
2023	725	+0.61%

Source: EHESS and INSEE (1968-2023)

== See also ==
- Communes of the Somme department
