= Nibas =

- Commune
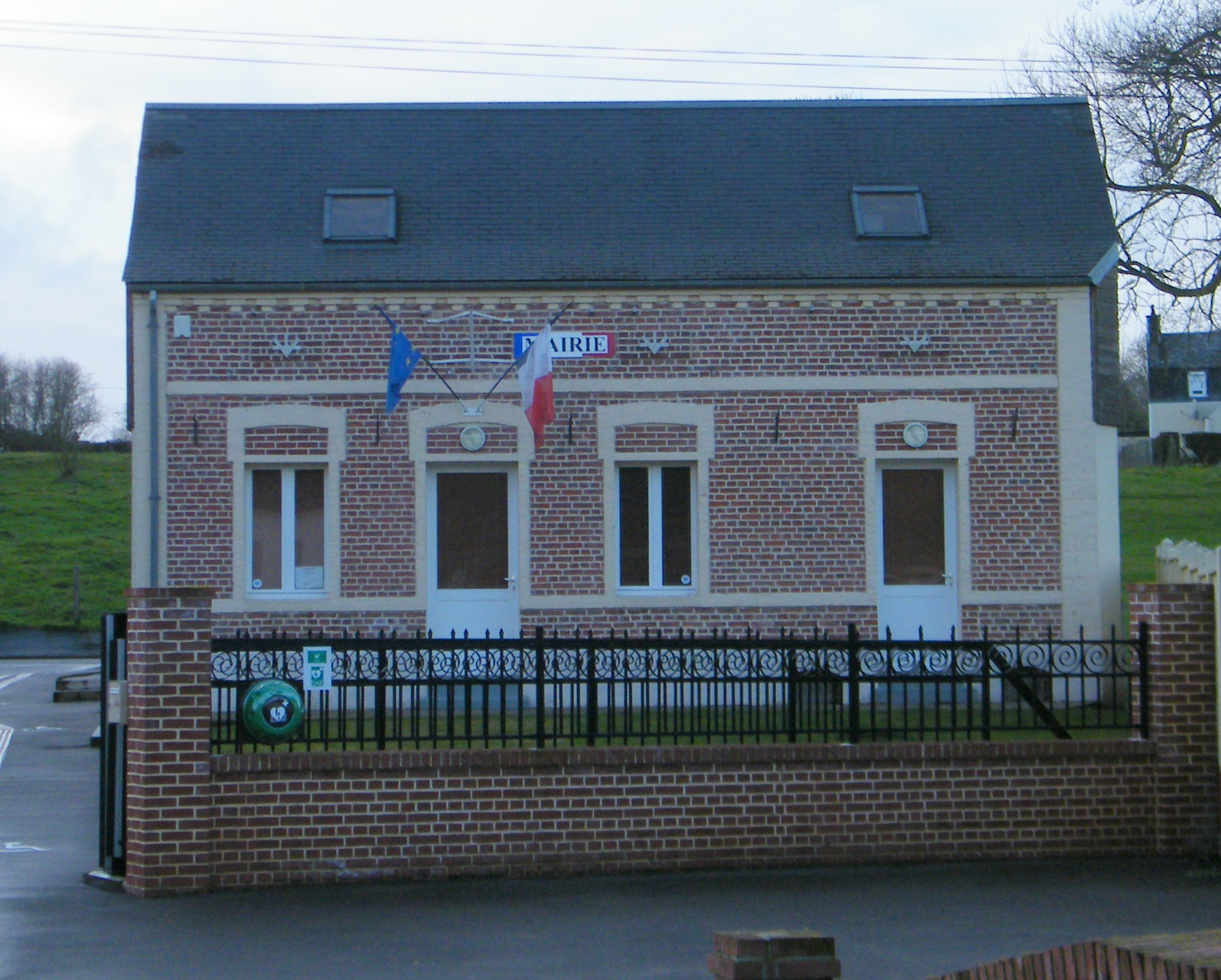
- The town hall in Nibas

- Coat of arms
- Location of Nibas
- Location within France Location within Hauts-de-France
- Coordinates: 50°06′06″N 1°35′21″E
- Country: France
- Region: Hauts-de-France
- Department: Somme
- Arrondissement: Abbeville
- Canton: Friville-Escarbotin
- Intercommunality: CC Vimeu

Government
  - Mayor (2020–2026): René Roussel
- Area^{1}: 12.65 km^{2} (4.88 sq mi)
- Elevation: 43 m (141 ft)
- Highest elevation: 97 m (318 ft)
- Lowest elevation: 27 m (89 ft)
- Population (2023): 828
  - Density: 65.5/km^{2} (170/sq mi)
- Time zone: UTC+01:00 (CET)
  - Summer (DST): UTC+02:00 (CEST)
- INSEE/Postal code: 80597 /80390
- ^{1} French Land Register data, which excludes lakes, ponds, glaciers > 1 km^{2} (0.386 sq mi or 247 acres) and river estuaries.

Nibas is a commune in the Somme department in Hauts-de-France in northern France.

== Geography ==
Nibas is situated on the D2a road, some 10 miles (16 km) west of Abbeville.

== Population ==
Historical population
Year	Pop.	±% p.a.
1968	712	—
1975	652	−1.25%
1982	719	+1.41%
1990	809	+1.49%
1999	749	−0.85%
2007	832	+1.32%
2012	836	+0.10%
2017	853	+0.40%
2023	828	−0.49%
Source: INSEE

== See also ==
- Communes of the Somme department
