= Oust-Marest =

- Commune
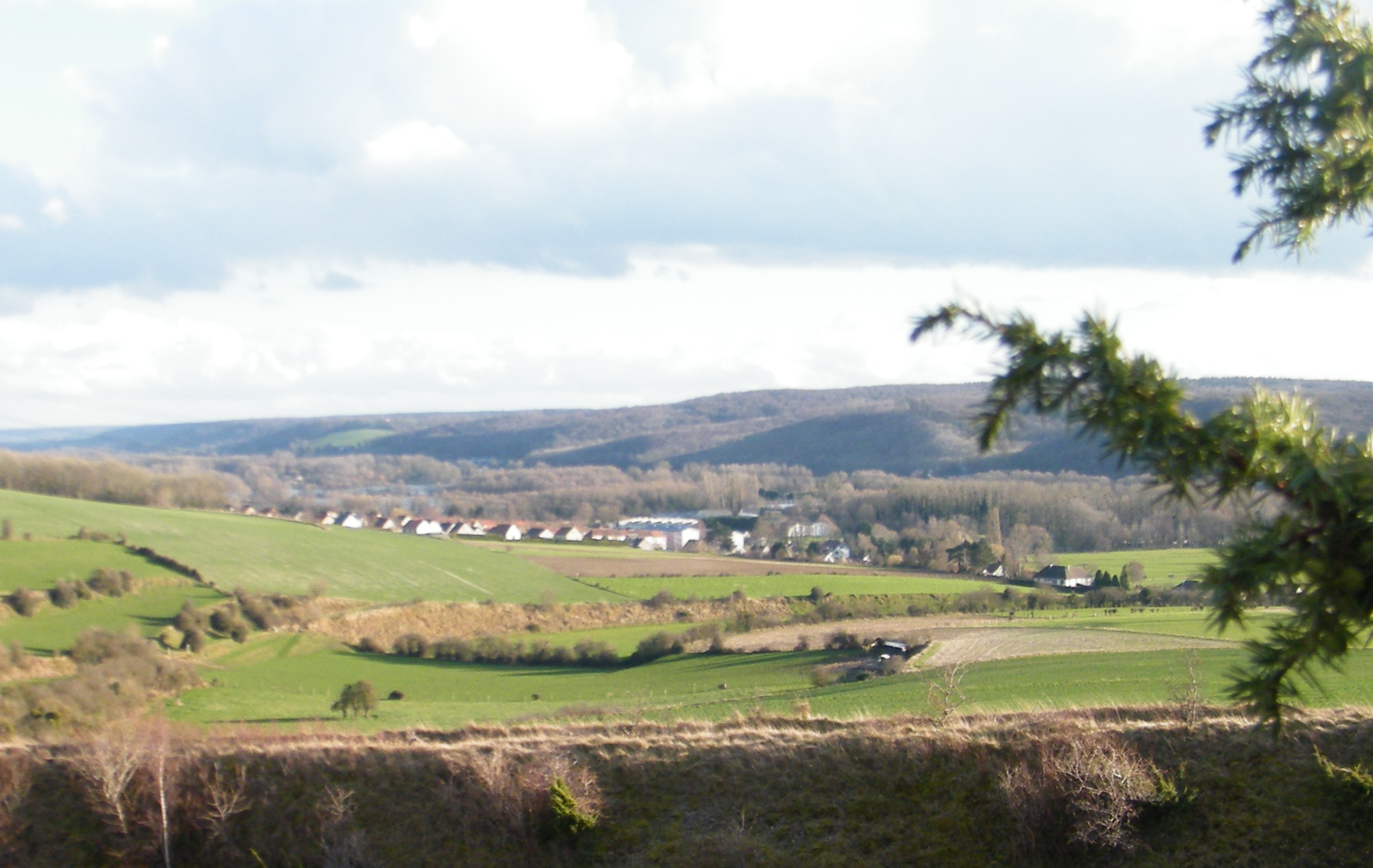
- A general view of Oust-Marest

- Coat of arms
- Location of Oust-Marest
- Location within France Location within Hauts-de-France
- Coordinates: 50°02′37″N 1°27′35″E
- Country: France
- Region: Hauts-de-France
- Department: Somme
- Arrondissement: Abbeville
- Canton: Friville-Escarbotin
- Intercommunality: CC Villes Sœurs

Government
  - Mayor (2024–2026): Vincent Morand
- Area^{1}: 5.8 km^{2} (2.2 sq mi)
- Elevation: 15 m (49 ft)
- Highest elevation: 113 m (371 ft)
- Lowest elevation: 7 m (23 ft)
- Population (2023): 608
  - Density: 100/km^{2} (270/sq mi)
- Time zone: UTC+01:00 (CET)
  - Summer (DST): UTC+02:00 (CEST)
- INSEE/Postal code: 80613 /80460
- ^{1} French Land Register data, which excludes lakes, ponds, glaciers > 1 km^{2} (0.386 sq mi or 247 acres) and river estuaries.

Oust-Marest is a commune in the Somme département in Hauts-de-France in northern France.

== Geography ==
The commune is situated on the D1015 road, some 20 miles (32 km) southwest of Abbeville, on the banks of the river Bresle, the border with Seine-Maritime.

== Population ==
Historical population
Year	Pop.	±% p.a.
1968	615	—
1975	665	+1.12%
1982	664	−0.02%
1990	656	−0.15%
1999	704	+0.79%
2007	649	−1.01%
2012	631	−0.56%
2017	630	−0.03%
2023	608	−0.59%
Source: INSEE

== History ==
The name of Oust-Marest comes from Roman origins. Possibly from a settlement named in honour of Augusta. Archaeologists have found traces of a Gallo-Roman amphitheatre and a temple in the locality.

== Places of interest ==
- A watermill on the river Bresle

== See also ==
- Communes of the Somme department
