= Saint-Quentin-la-Motte-Croix-au-Bailly =

- Commune
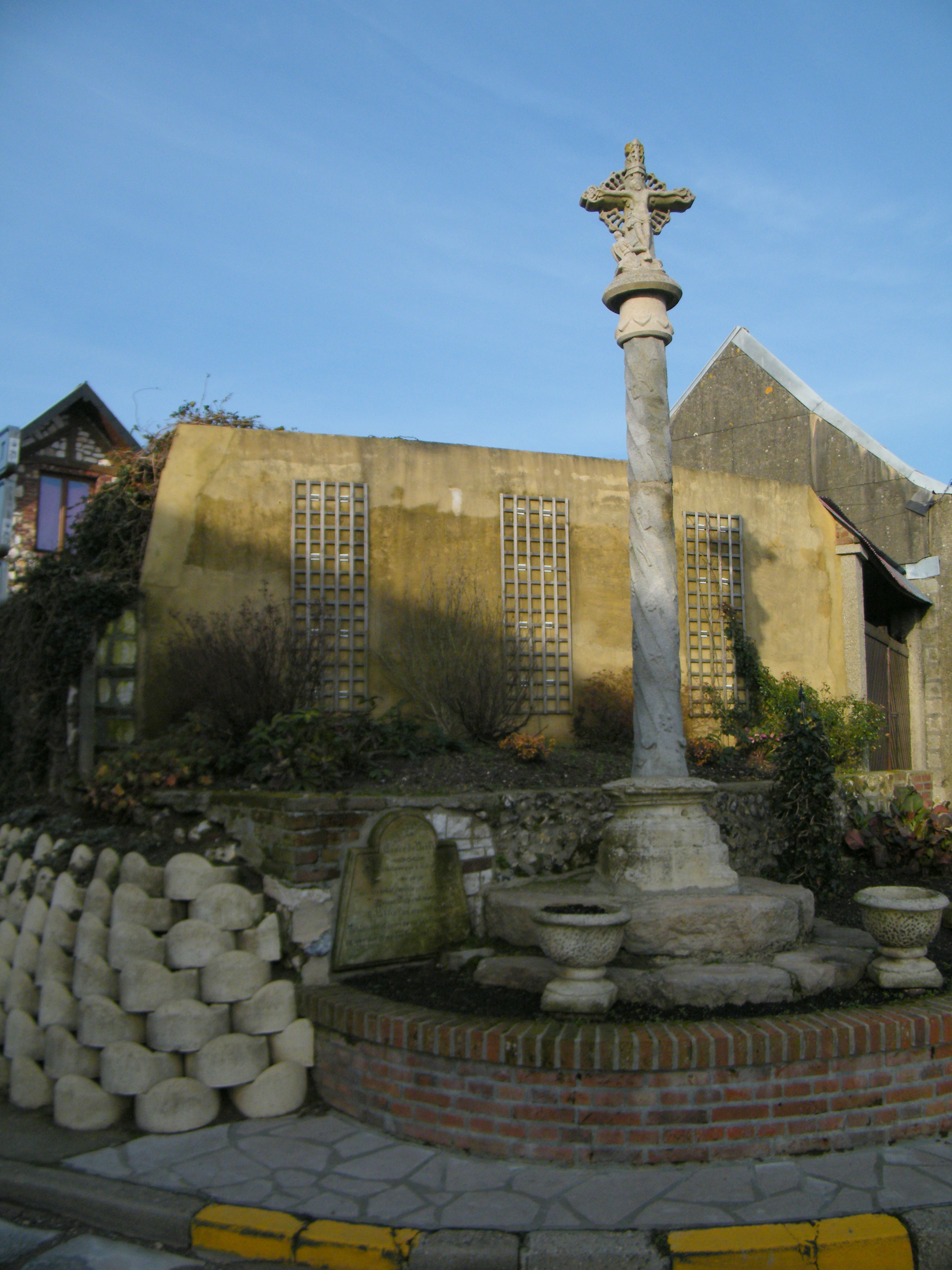
- The cross in Saint-Quentin-la-Motte-Croix-au-Bailly

- Coat of arms
- Location of Saint-Quentin-la-Motte-Croix-au-Bailly
- Location within France Location within Hauts-de-France
- Coordinates: 50°04′28″N 1°27′09″E
- Country: France
- Region: Hauts-de-France
- Department: Somme
- Arrondissement: Abbeville
- Canton: Friville-Escarbotin
- Intercommunality: CC Villes Sœurs

Government
  - Mayor (2020–2026): Raynald Boulenger
- Area^{1}: 6.91 km^{2} (2.67 sq mi)
- Elevation: 109 m (358 ft)
- Highest elevation: 121 m (397 ft)
- Lowest elevation: 5 m (16 ft)
- Population (2023): 1,252
  - Density: 181/km^{2} (469/sq mi)
- Time zone: UTC+01:00 (CET)
  - Summer (DST): UTC+02:00 (CEST)
- INSEE/Postal code: 80714 /80880
- ^{1} French Land Register data, which excludes lakes, ponds, glaciers > 1 km^{2} (0.386 sq mi or 247 acres) and river estuaries.

Saint-Quentin-la-Motte-Croix-au-Bailly (French pronunciation: [sɛ̃ kɑ̃tɛ̃ la mɔt kʁwa o baji]; Picard: Saint-Quentin-la-Motte-L'Croé-au-Bailly) is a commune in the Somme department in Hauts-de-France in northern France.

== Geography ==
The commune is situated at 26 kilometres (16 mi) west of Abbeville, on the D63 road and about 1.6 km from the coast.

== Population ==
Historical population
Year	Pop.	±% p.a.
1968	1,256	—
1975	1,318	+0.69%
1982	1,292	−0.28%
1990	1,319	+0.26%
1999	1,310	−0.08%
2007	1,304	−0.06%
2012	1,322	+0.27%
2017	1,291	−0.47%
2023	1,252	−0.51%
Source: INSEE

== Places of interest ==
- The seventeenth century church at Saint-Quentin
- The sixteenth century cross

== See also ==
- Communes of the Somme department
