= Yzengremer =

- Commune
- The town hall and church in Yzengremer

- Coat of arms
- Location of Yzengremer
- Location within France Location within Hauts-de-France
- Coordinates: 50°03′40″N 1°31′07″E
- Country: France
- Region: Hauts-de-France
- Department: Somme
- Arrondissement: Abbeville
- Canton: Friville-Escarbotin
- Intercommunality: Vimeu

Government
  - Mayor (2020–2026): Vincent Penon
- Area^{1}: 3.4 km^{2} (1.3 sq mi)
- Elevation: 120 m (390 ft)
- Highest elevation: 127 m (417 ft)
- Lowest elevation: 102 m (335 ft)
- Population (2023): 490
  - Density: 140/km^{2} (370/sq mi)
- Time zone: UTC+01:00 (CET)
  - Summer (DST): UTC+02:00 (CEST)
- INSEE/Postal code: 80834 /80520
- ^{1} French Land Register data, which excludes lakes, ponds, glaciers > 1 km^{2} (0.386 sq mi or 247 acres) and river estuaries.

Yzengremer (Picard: Zinguérmeu) is a commune in the Somme département in Hauts-de-France in northern France.

== Geography ==
Yzengremer is situated 15 miles (24 km) west of Abbeville, along the D19 road. It is situated 4.7 miles (7.5 km) away from the Channel coast, near the former Route nationale 25 (now RD 925) which runs between Abbeville and Tréport.

The village can be accessed from the autoroutes A16 (Paris-Dunkerque) and A28 (Abbeville-Rouen).

== Population ==
Historical population

| Year | Pop. | ±% p.a. |
|---|---|---|
| 1800 | 414 | — |
| 1821 | 448 | +0.38% |
| 1846 | 502 | +0.46% |
| 1872 | 504 | +0.02% |
| 1901 | 505 | +0.01% |
| 1926 | 470 | −0.29% |
| 1946 | 439 | −0.34% |
| 1962 | 471 | +0.44% |
| 1968 | 471 | +0.00% |

| Year | Pop. | ±% p.a. |
|---|---|---|
| 1975 | 499 | +0.83% |
| 1982 | 483 | −0.46% |
| 1990 | 462 | −0.55% |
| 1999 | 516 | +1.24% |
| 2007 | 565 | +1.14% |
| 2012 | 532 | −1.20% |
| 2017 | 514 | −0.69% |
| 2023 | 490 | −0.79% |

Source: EHESS (1800-1999) and INSEE

== Economy ==
The economy is based around agriculture, including cereals, sugar beet, fodder, and cattle.

== Sites and monuments ==
The commune contains the Eglise Saint-Médard, which dates back to the 15th century, and a 17th-century château, a rectangular brick and stone building flanked by a single wing at right angles. The front-central section of each facade was added in the 19th century. Additionally, an old locksmith works, dating from the late 19th to mid-20th century, is listed on the French Ministry of Culture's inventory of cultural heritage along with the gardens of the Château d'Yzengremer.

== See also ==
- Communes of the Somme department
