= Allenay =

Commune in Hauts-de-France, France

- Commune
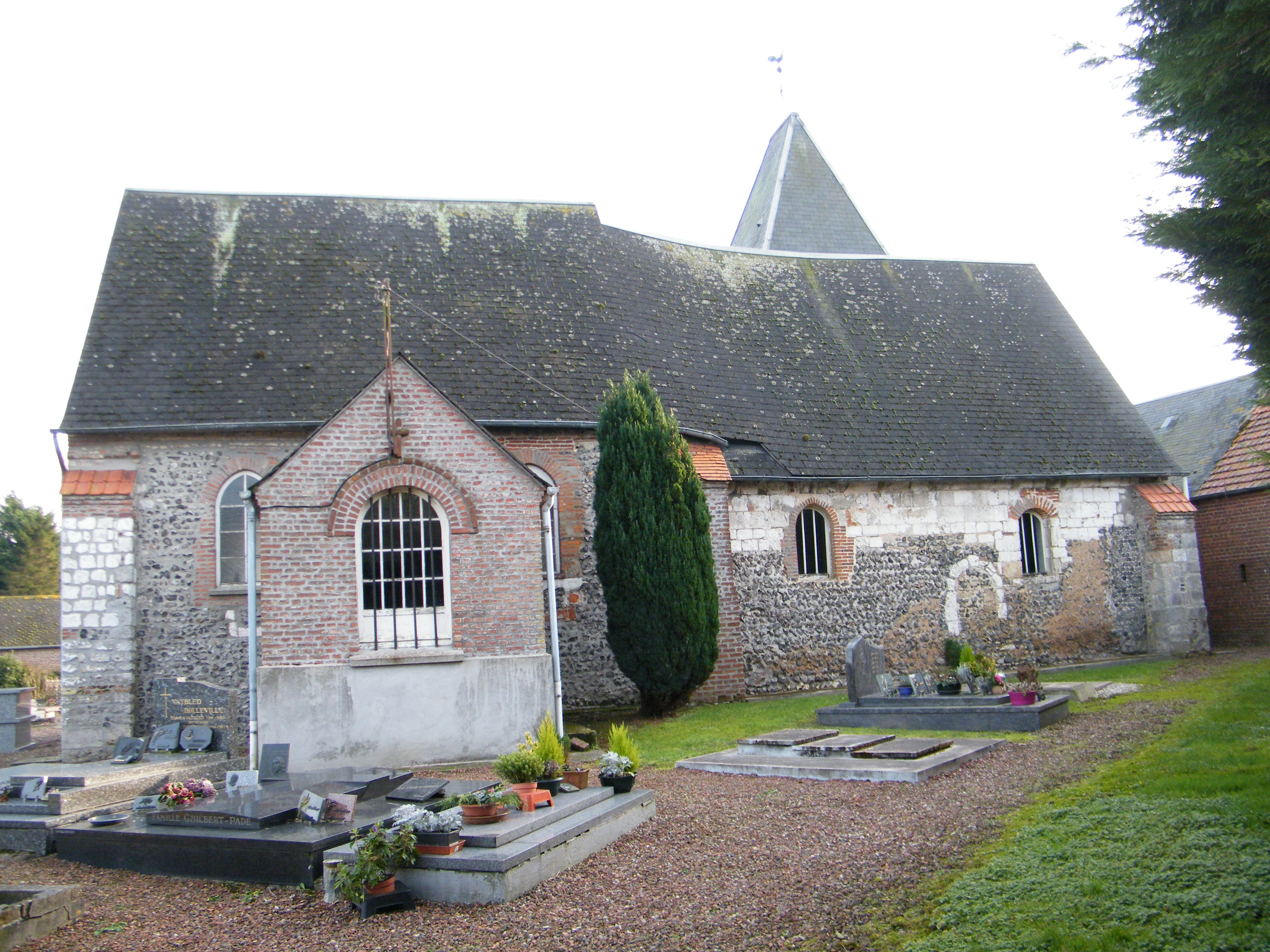
- The church in Allenay

- Coat of arms
- Location of Allenay
- Location within France Location within Hauts-de-France
- Coordinates: 50°05′15″N 1°29′31″E
- Country: France
- Region: Hauts-de-France
- Department: Somme
- Arrondissement: Abbeville
- Canton: Friville-Escarbotin
- Intercommunality: CC Villes Sœurs

Government
  - Mayor (2020–2026): Nathalie Martel
- Area^{1}: 2.18 km^{2} (0.84 sq mi)
- Elevation: 110 m (360 ft)
- Highest elevation: 117 m (384 ft)
- Lowest elevation: 62 m (203 ft)
- Population (2023): 253
  - Density: 116/km^{2} (301/sq mi)
- Time zone: UTC+01:00 (CET)
  - Summer (DST): UTC+02:00 (CEST)
- INSEE/Postal code: 80018 /80130
- ^{1} French Land Register data, which excludes lakes, ponds, glaciers > 1 km^{2} (0.386 sq mi or 247 acres) and river estuaries.

Allenay (French pronunciation: [alnɛ]) is a commune in the Somme department in Hauts-de-France in northern France.

== Geography ==
The commune is situated c. 5 km from the English Channel, on the D19 road and 11 km northeast of Le Tréport on the border of the departments of the Somme and Seine-Maritime.

== See also ==
- Communes of the Somme department
