= Mers-les-Bains =

- Commune
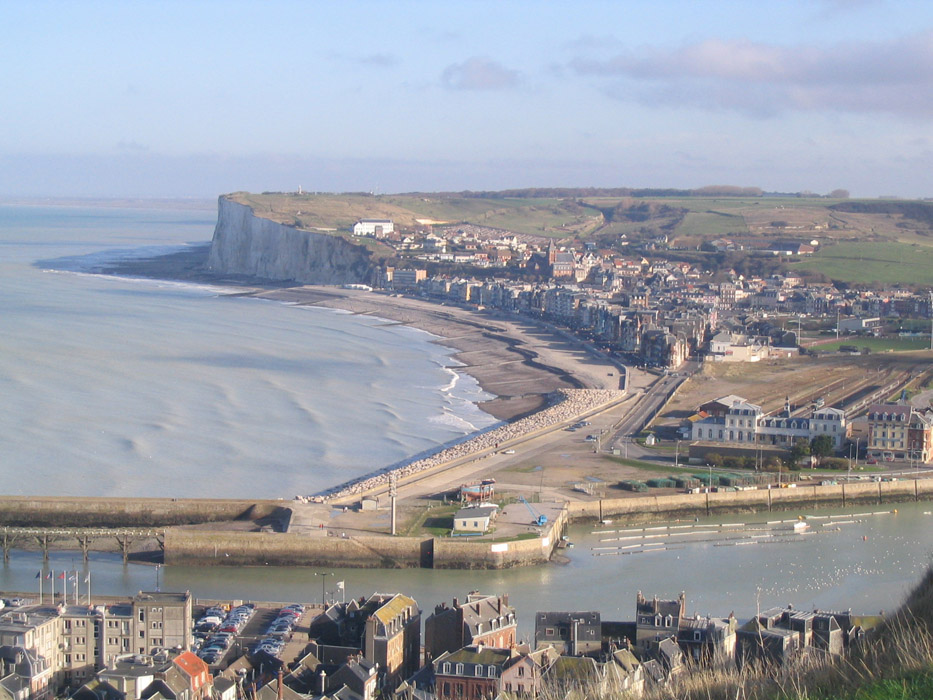
- A view of the town from Tréport

- Coat of arms
- Location of Mers-les-Bains
- Location within France Location within Hauts-de-France
- Coordinates: 50°04′05″N 1°23′19″E
- Country: France
- Region: Hauts-de-France
- Department: Somme
- Arrondissement: Abbeville
- Canton: Friville-Escarbotin
- Intercommunality: CC Villes Sœurs

Government
  - Mayor (2020–2026): Michel Delepine
- Area^{1}: 5.39 km^{2} (2.08 sq mi)
- Elevation: 10 m (33 ft)
- Highest elevation: 99 m (325 ft)
- Lowest elevation: 0 m (0 ft)
- Population (2023): 2,540
  - Density: 471/km^{2} (1,220/sq mi)
- Time zone: UTC+01:00 (CET)
  - Summer (DST): UTC+02:00 (CEST)
- INSEE/Postal code: 80533 /80350
- ^{1} French Land Register data, which excludes lakes, ponds, glaciers > 1 km^{2} (0.386 sq mi or 247 acres) and river estuaries.

Mers-les-Bains (French pronunciation: [mɛʁs le bɛ̃]) is a commune in the Somme department in Hauts-de-France in northern France.

== Geography ==
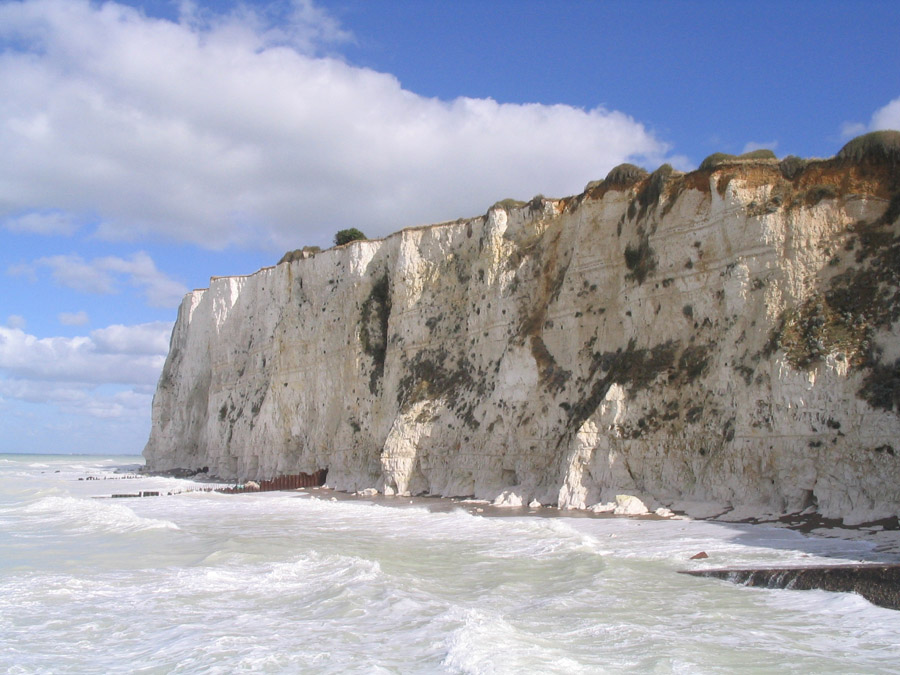
The chalk cliffs

The commune is situated on the D1015 road, some 25 miles (40 km) west of Abbeville, Mers-les-Bains faces the English Channel near the mouth of the river Bresle, on the border between Picardy and Normandy. This ‘bathing station’ (seaside resort) has both pebbles and sand (at low tide) on the 1 kilometre (1 mi) beach and high chalk cliffs. With its neighbouring towns Eu and Le Tréport so close by, it appears as one large conglomeration. They are collectively known as the 'three sister-towns' (les trois villes soeurs).

Much of the older part of town developed in the heyday of seaside bathing, during the latter part of the 19th century. As a consequence, the fine villas that were developed in those times are now subject to preservation orders. Any refurbishment must be in the same materials and colours as the original work. No plastic doors or roller shutters are allowed.

== History ==
Mers-les-Bains does not have much history. There are one or two noble families known to have been seigneurs of places within the commune; The coat-of-arms, carved in stone, of the Mython family of Froideville adorns one of the Mayor's offices today. The Lucas family of Rompval, the Lattaignant seigneurs of Blengues, and the Torcy family, seigneurs of Mers-les-Bains are all mentioned in archives. Some parts of their coat-of-arms can still be seen today, as part of the official badge of the town, adopted in December 1962.
Once just a small fishing port, the seaside ‘bathing station’ grew partly because of the railway line that ran from Paris to Tréport. Entire families could make the 3 hour journey from Paris to discover the benefits of bathing and breathe the fresh, iodized air. Many would eventually buy land and build sumptuous second homes in the town.

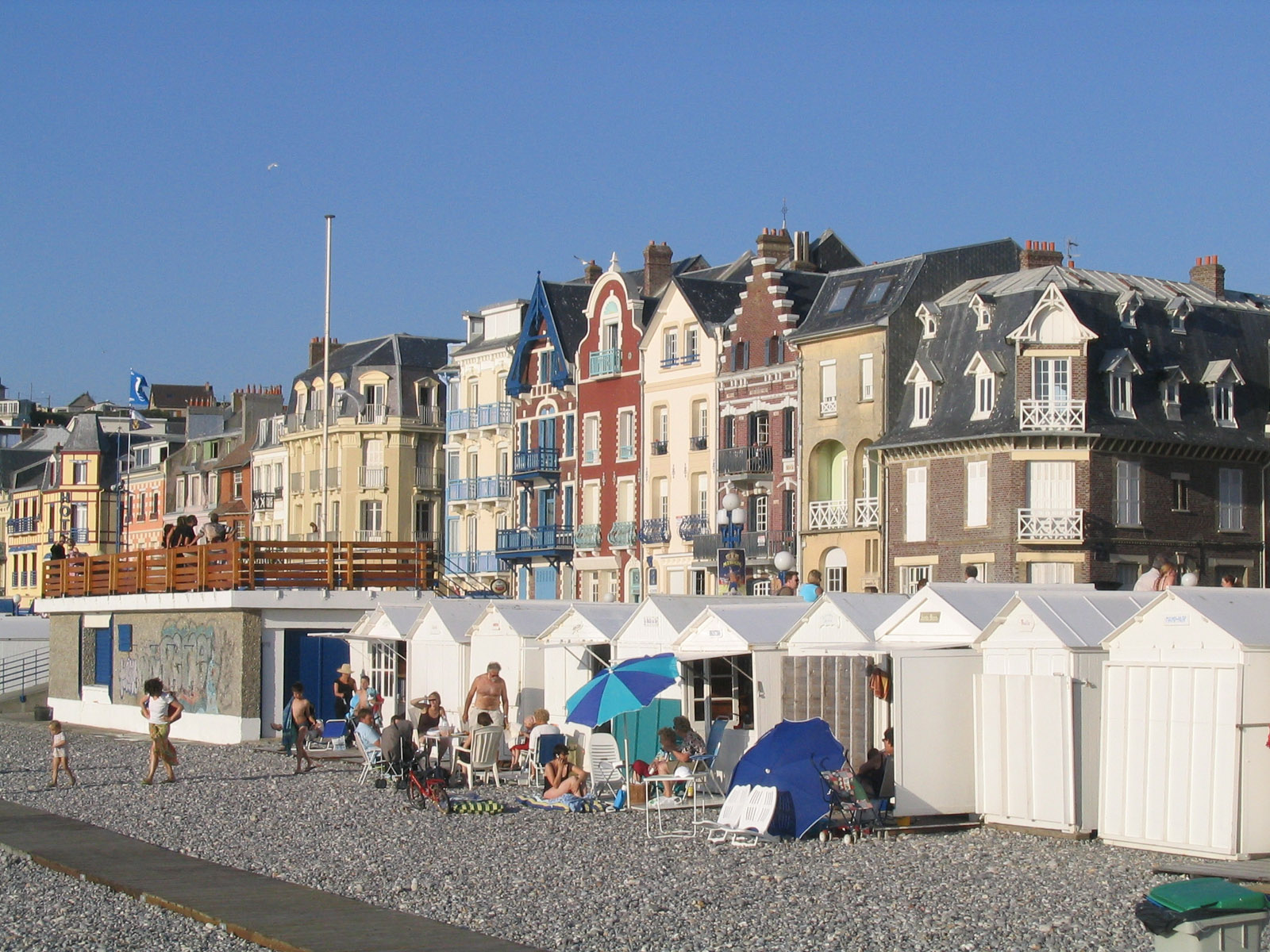
The beach huts and the villas

== Population ==
Historical population
| Year | Pop. | ±% p.a. |
|---|---|---|
| 1968 | 4,107 | — |
| 1975 | 4,628 | +1.72% |
| 1982 | 3,945 | −2.26% |
| 1990 | 3,540 | −1.34% |
| 1999 | 3,394 | −0.47% |
| 2007 | 3,454 | +0.22% |
| 2012 | 2,880 | −3.57% |
| 2017 | 2,825 | −0.38% |
| 2023 | 2,540 | −1.76% |
Source: INSEE

== Places of interest ==
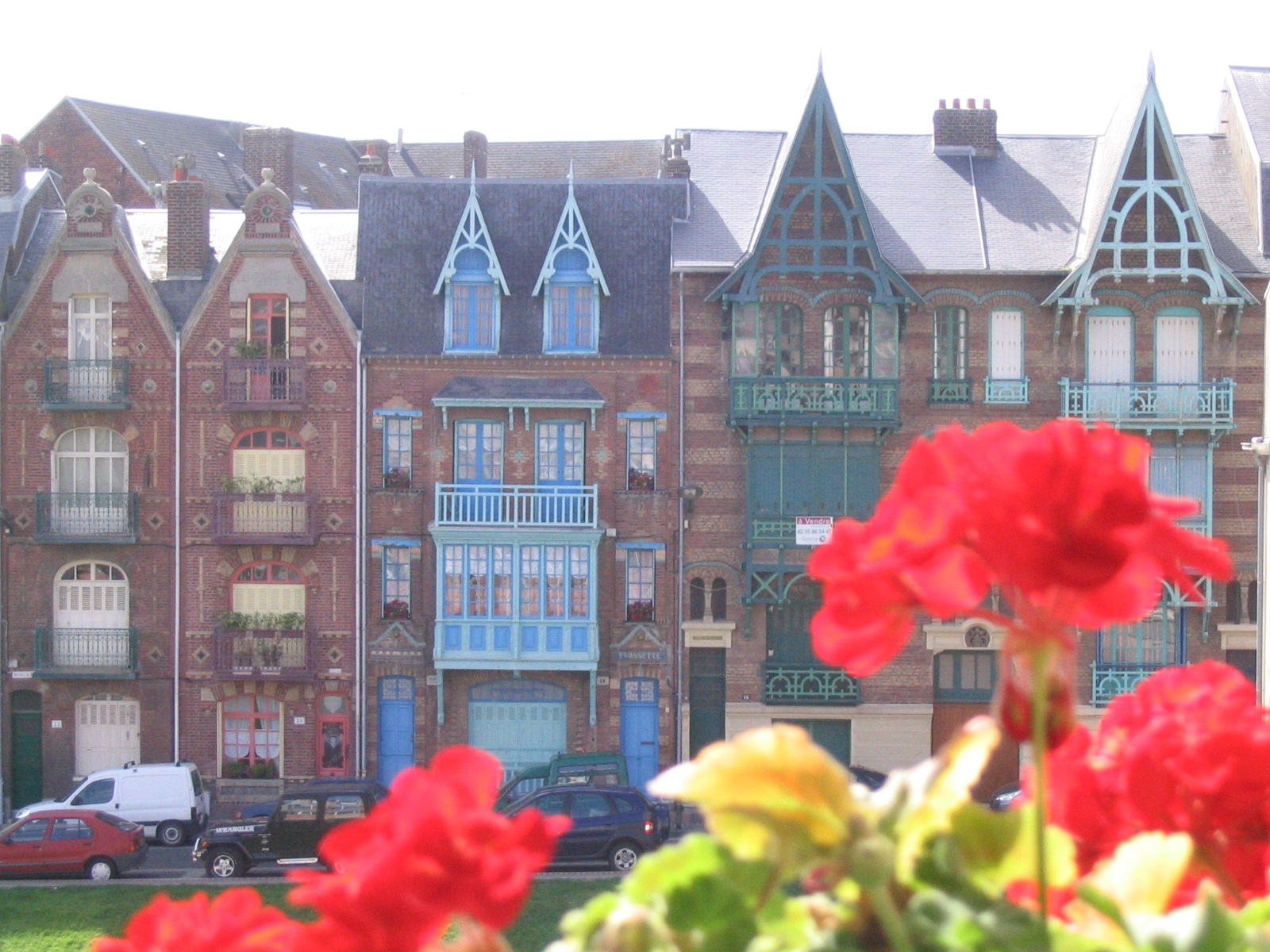
The characteristic vertical design of the buildings

- A Calvary, in stone, of St. Maximin, adorned by 4 gargoyles.
- Notre-Dame statue on the cliffs.
- The war memorial. A maple leaf commemorates the liberation of the town by the Canadian Chaudière regiment

== Personalities ==
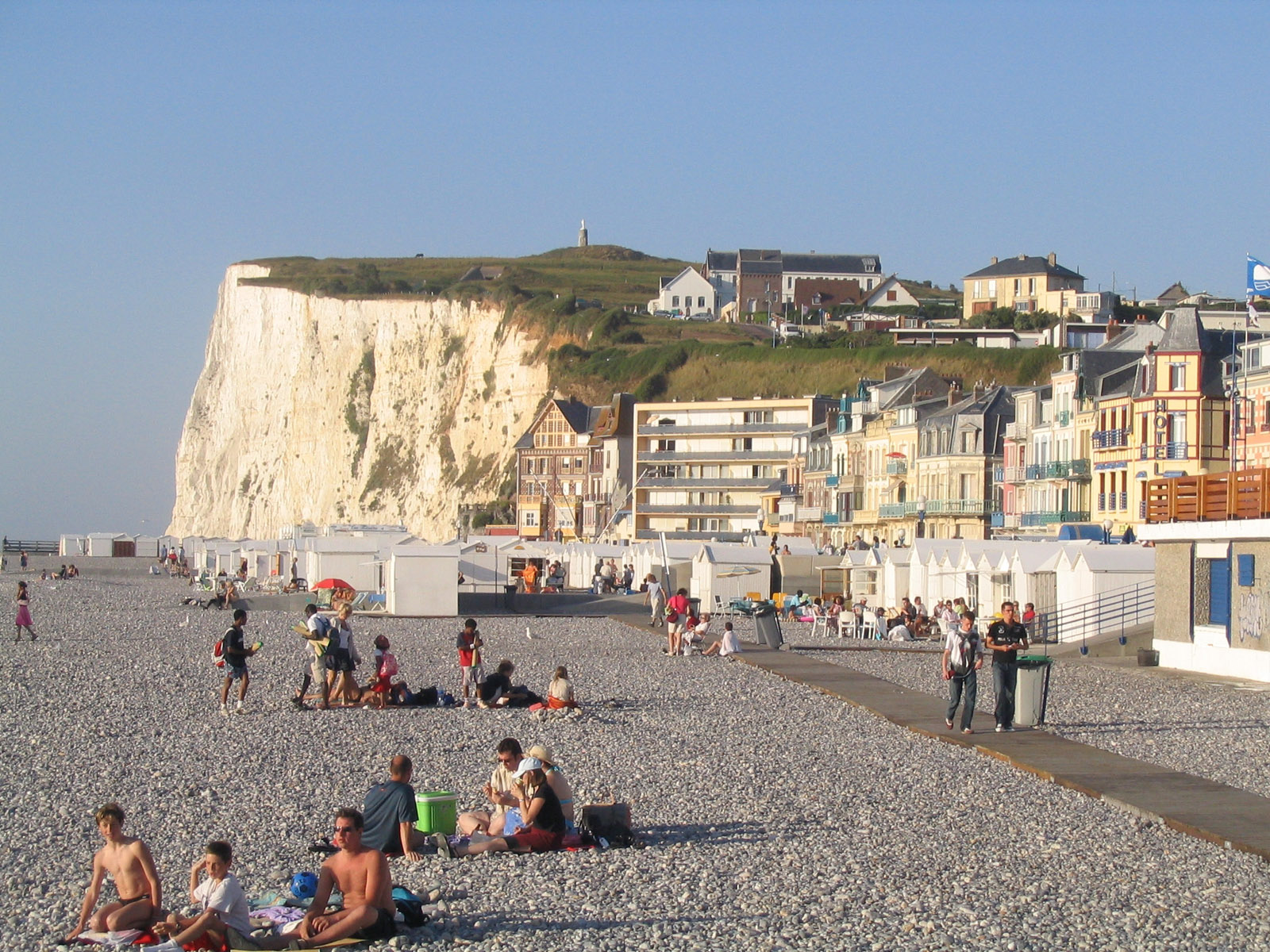
The esplanade

- Eugène Dabit author of the novel (Hôtel du Nord) was born in Mers-les-Bains
- Jules Verne spent holidays here with his family
- Victor Hugo wrote of his summers here
- Gustave Eiffel, engineer, spent his holidays here
- François Coppée, writer, worked here
- Augustin Chantrel, footballer who played for France in the World Cup of 1938 was born here

== Economy and tourism ==
The Saint-Gobain glass works, considered a world leader in perfume bottle production, is the town's biggest employer.
The town depends more and more on its reputation as a seaside resort. A prestigious award ‘The pavillon bleu d'Europe’ was awarded in 2006. Holiday residences are newly built or restored each and every year and the town flourishes.

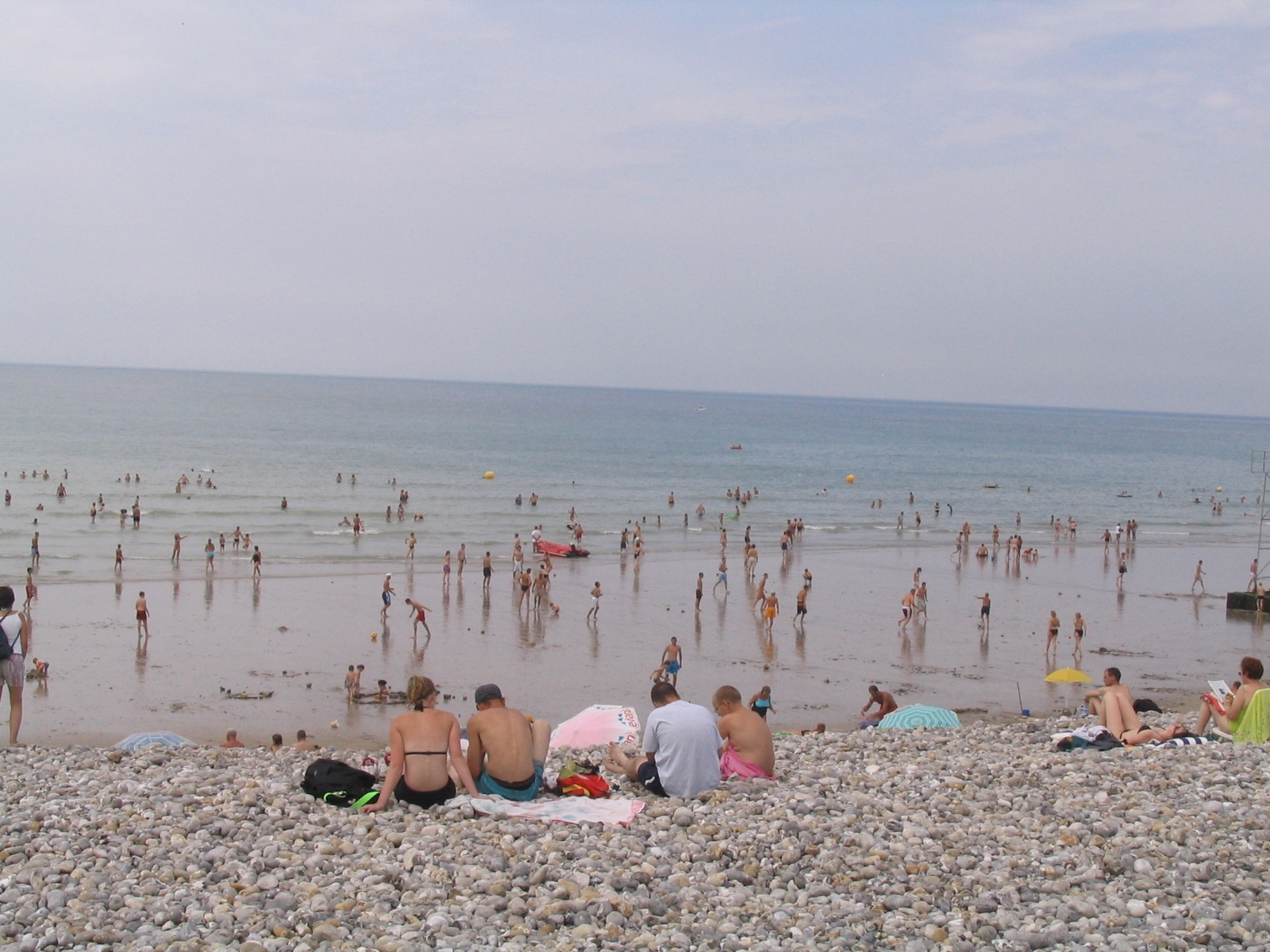
The sand exposed at low tide

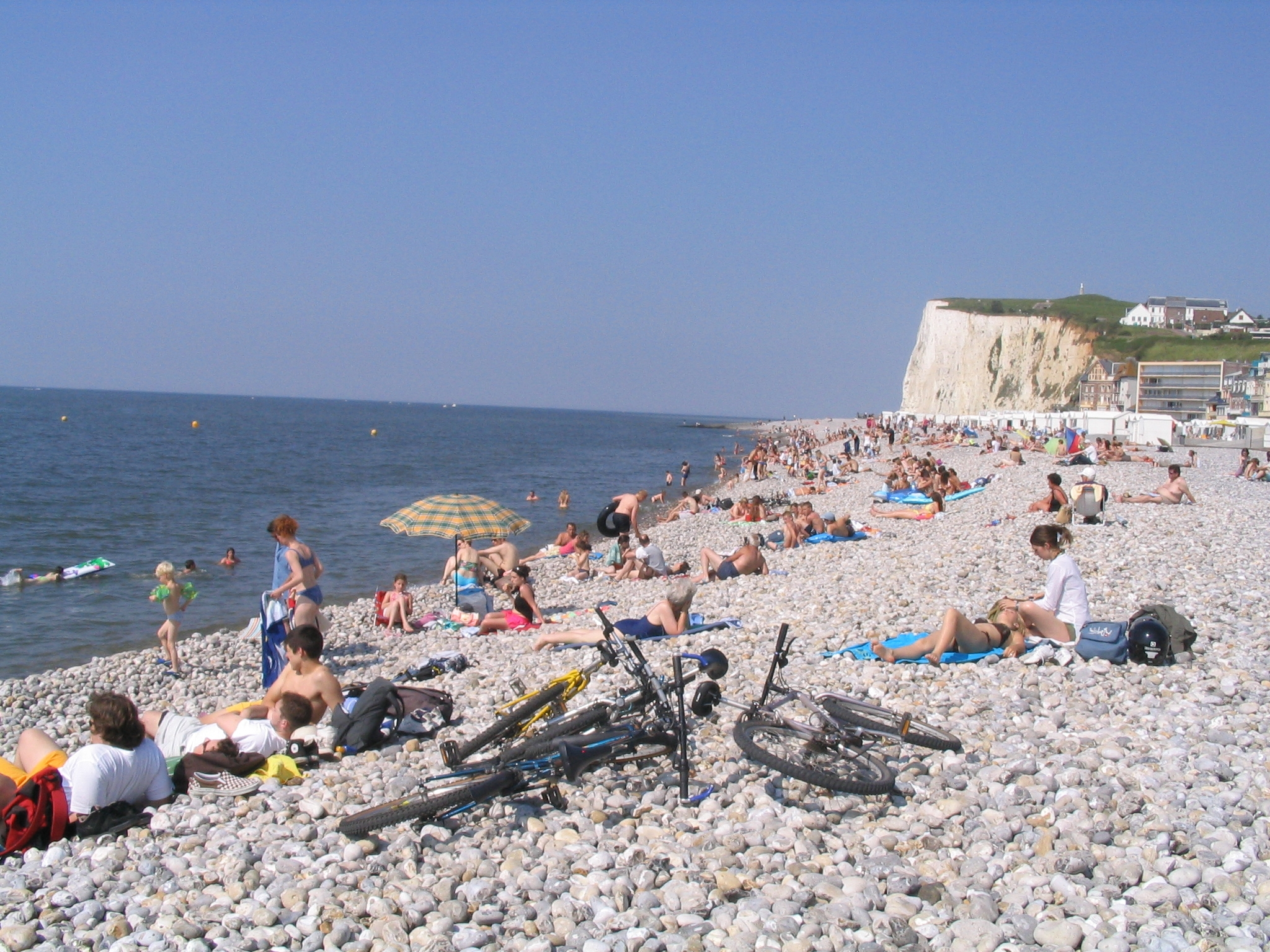
High tide at Mers

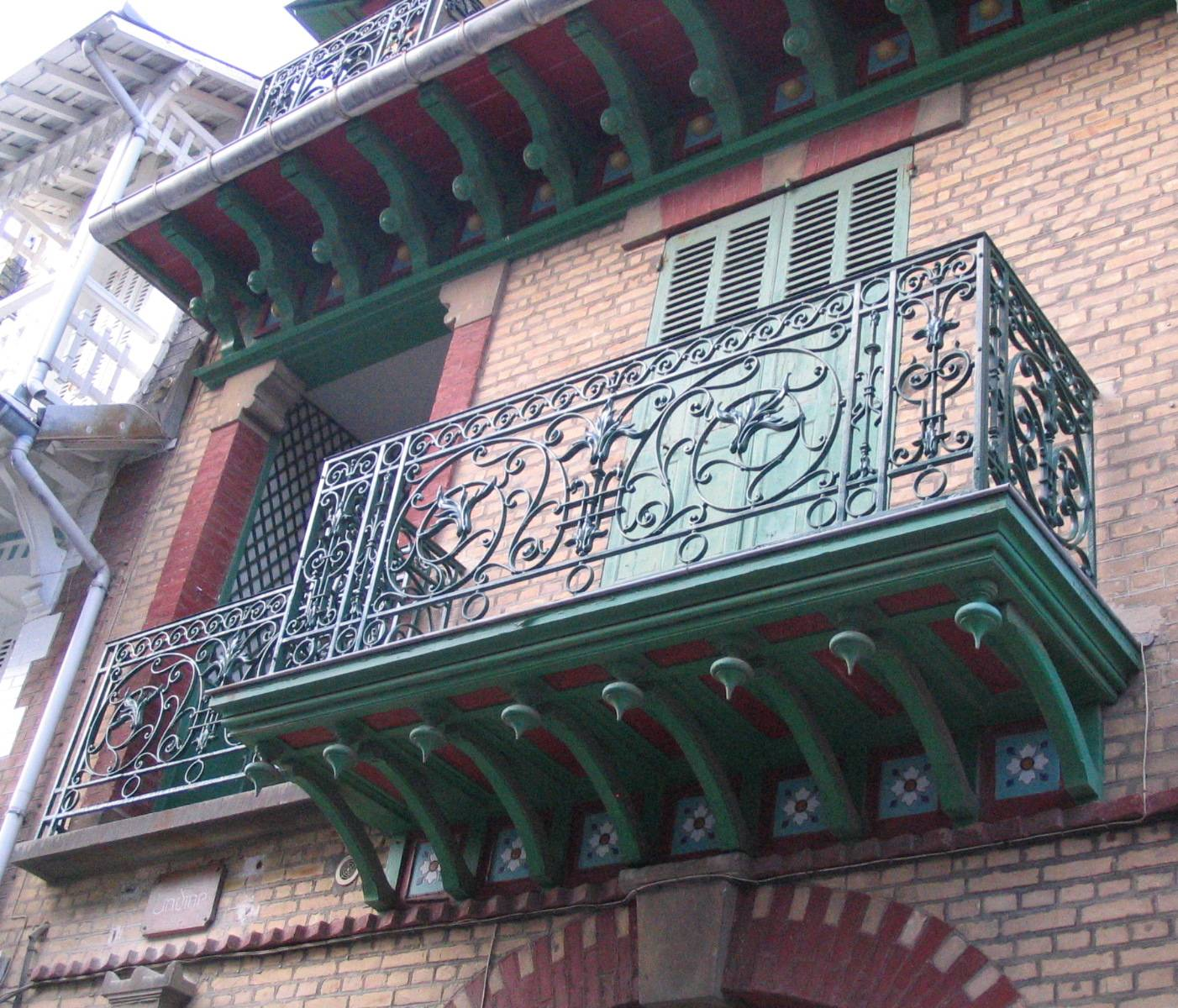
Sylish balcony

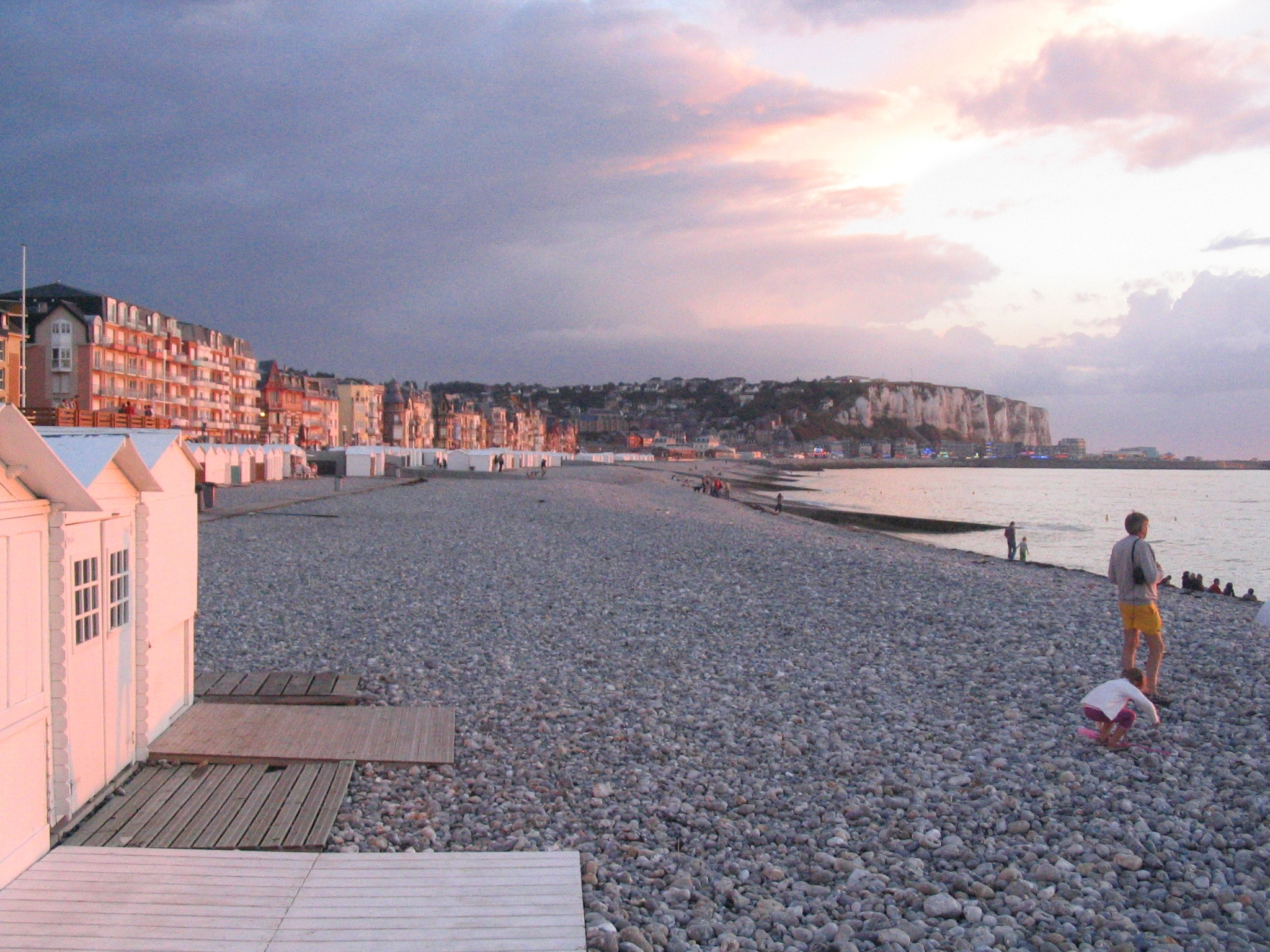
The beach at sunset

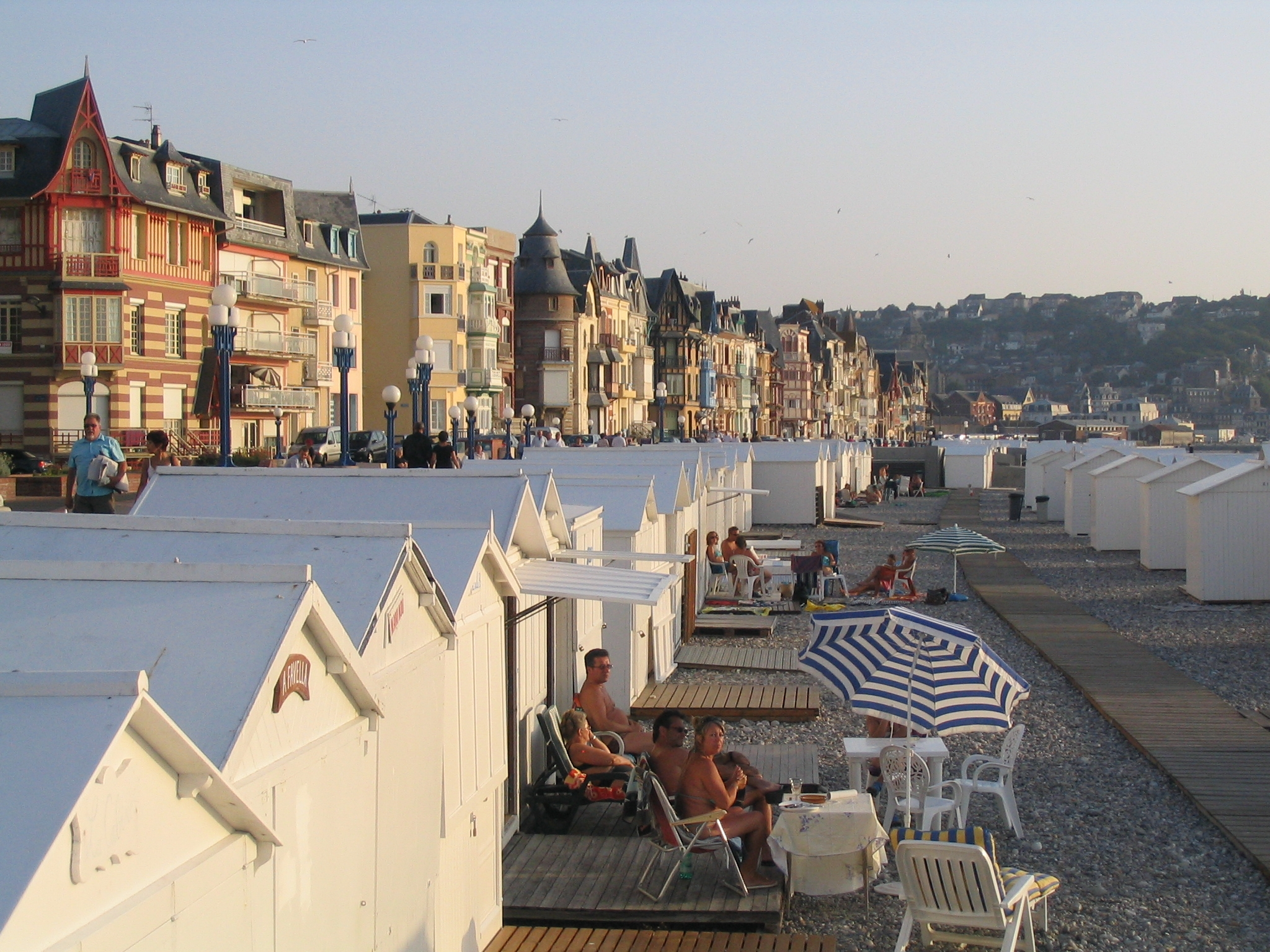
The beach in summer

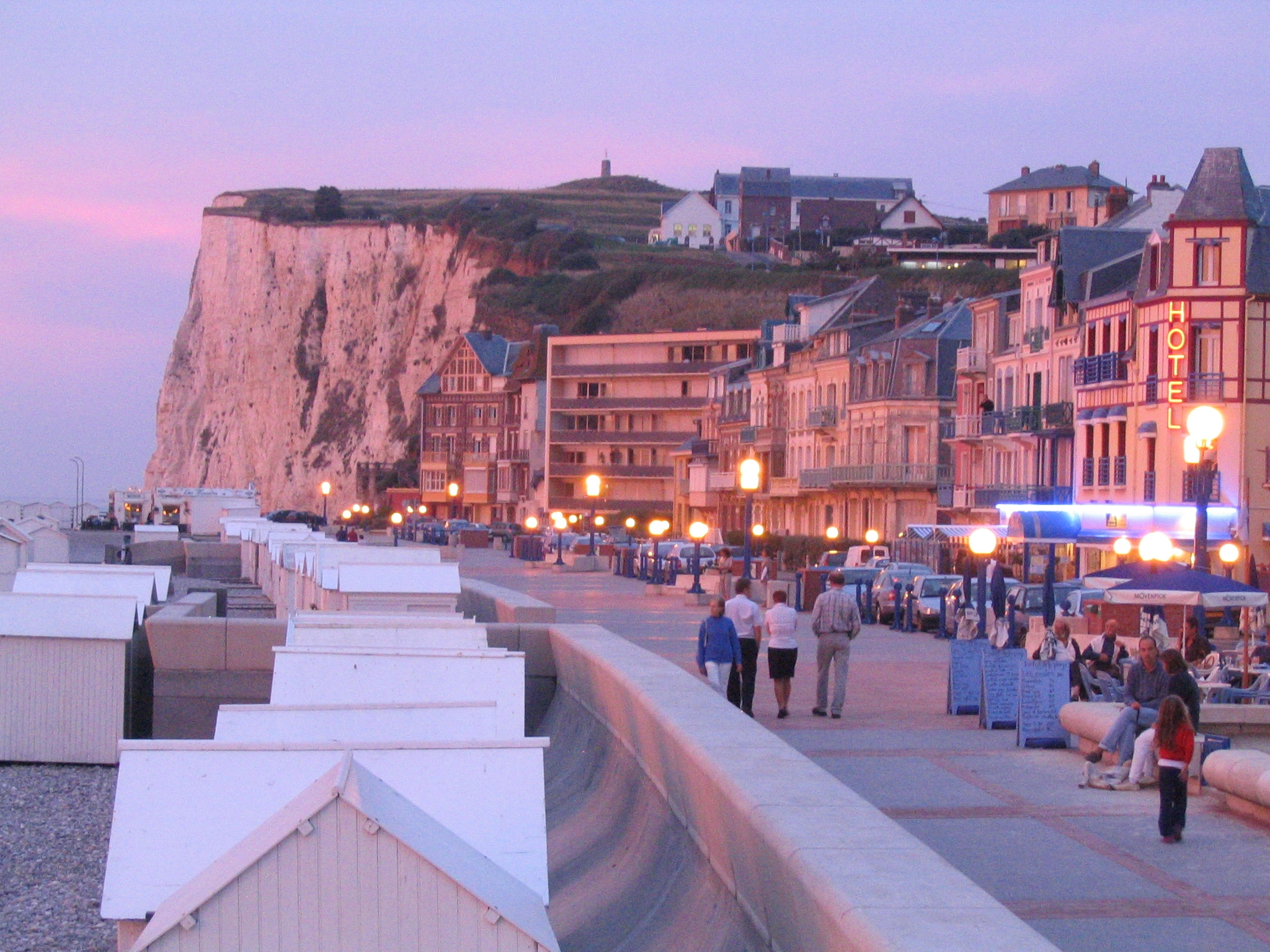
Strolling in the evening

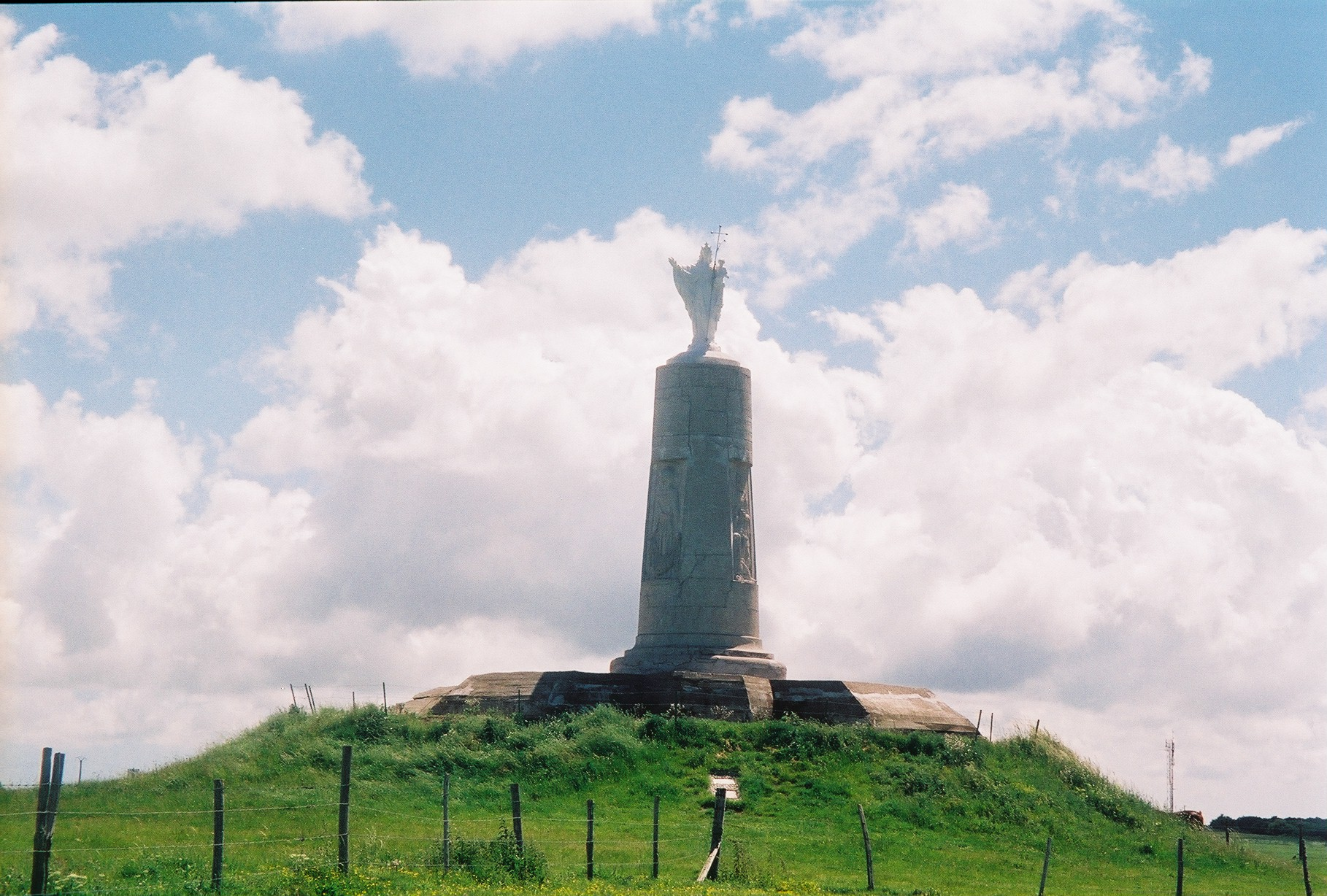
The statue of Notre-Dame

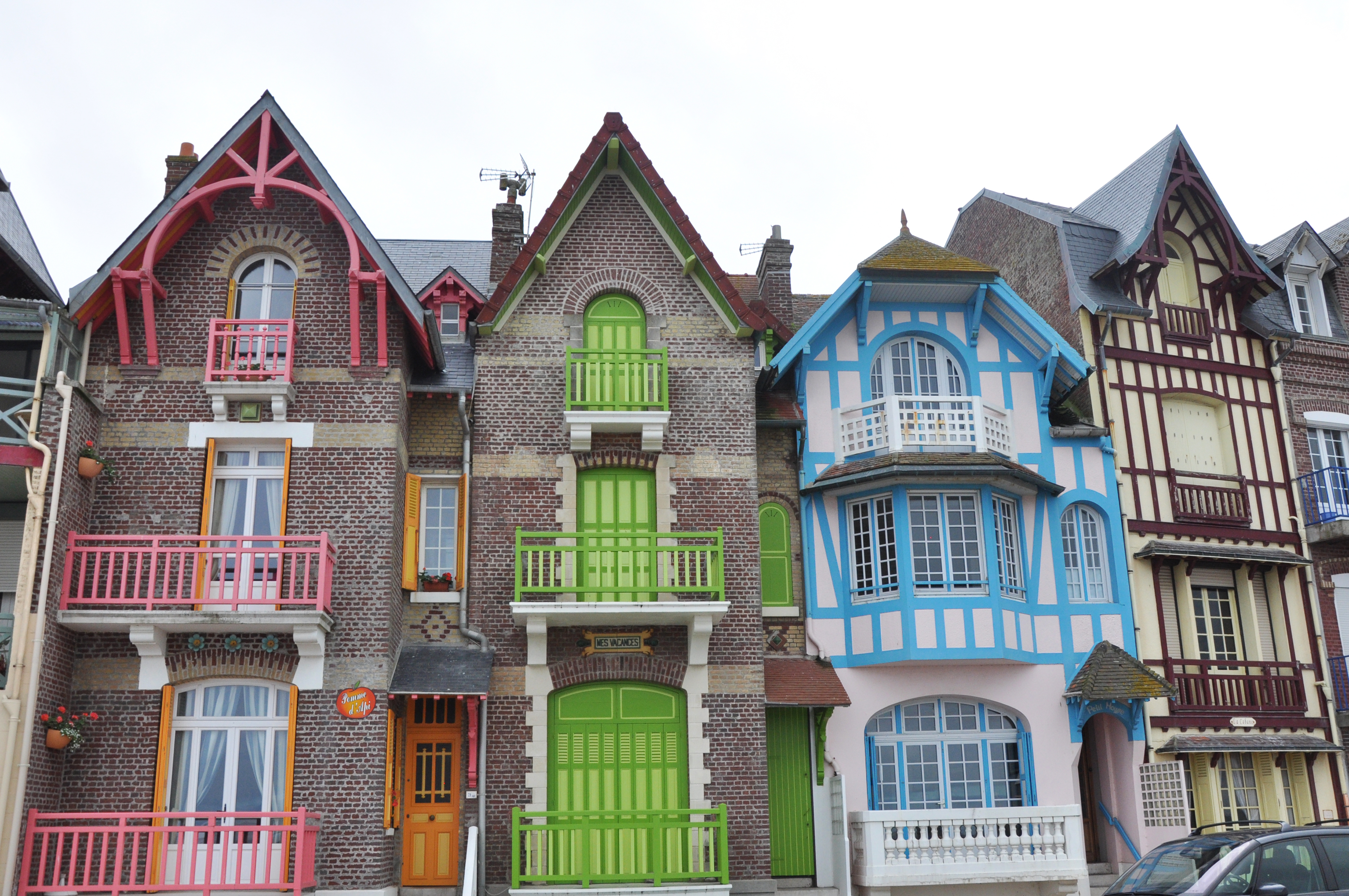
Sumptuous second homes

== Sea defences ==
Mers-les-Bains has suffered from flooding on a regular basis. The army has often been deployed with sandbags to stem the flow. A more permanent barrier is now being created for the three towns, at a projected cost of 13 million euros. This involves large rocks, transported on barges from Boulogne, being placed at the feet of the cliffs, to create a buffer and so preserve them and prevent further floods.

== Fauna ==
Both herring gulls and black-headed gulls are found in abundance, along with kestrels, in the air on the lookout for prey. This will include mussels, various crabs, shrimps and prawns.

== See also ==
- Communes of the Somme department
