= Friaucourt =

- Commune
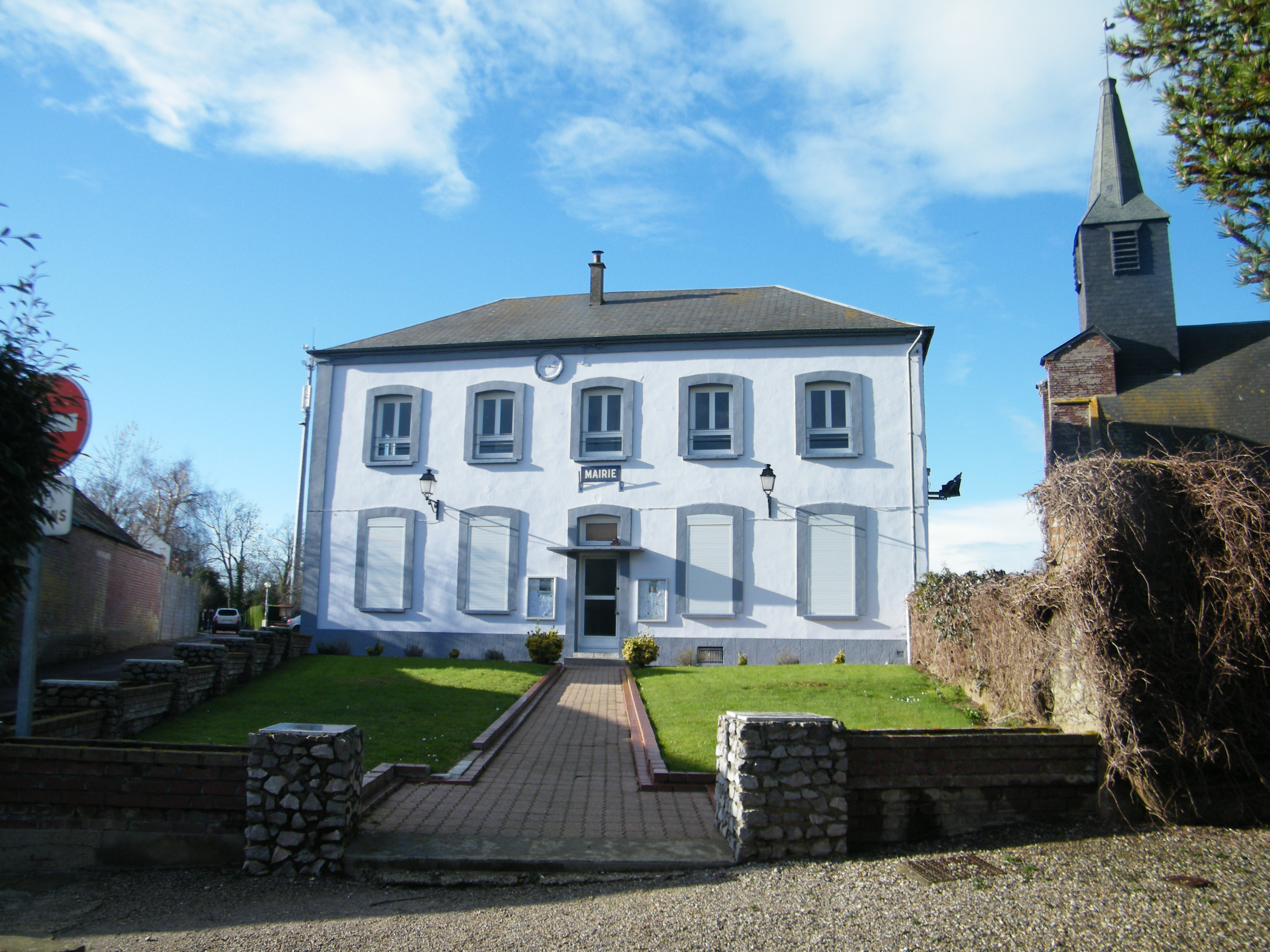
- The town hall in Friaucourt

- Coat of arms
- Location of Friaucourt
- Location within France Location within Hauts-de-France
- Coordinates: 50°05′24″N 1°28′36″E
- Country: France
- Region: Hauts-de-France
- Department: Somme
- Arrondissement: Abbeville
- Canton: Friville-Escarbotin
- Intercommunality: CC Villes Sœurs

Government
  - Mayor (2020–2026): Jean-Michel Delrue
- Area^{1}: 4.16 km^{2} (1.61 sq mi)
- Elevation: 80 m (260 ft)
- Highest elevation: 114 m (374 ft)
- Lowest elevation: 70 m (230 ft)
- Population (2023): 695
  - Density: 167/km^{2} (433/sq mi)
- Time zone: UTC+01:00 (CET)
  - Summer (DST): UTC+02:00 (CEST)
- INSEE/Postal code: 80364 /80460
- ^{1} French Land Register data, which excludes lakes, ponds, glaciers > 1 km^{2} (0.386 sq mi or 247 acres) and river estuaries.

Friaucourt (French pronunciation: [fʁijokuʁ]) is a commune in the Somme department in Hauts-de-France in northern France.

== Geography ==
Friaucourt is situated a mile and a half from the coast, 16 miles (26 km) west of Abbeville on the D19 and D63 junction

== Population ==
Historical population
Year	Pop.	±% p.a.
1968	605	—
1975	696	+2.02%
1982	761	+1.28%
1990	708	−0.90%
1999	669	−0.63%
2007	707	+0.69%
2012	763	+1.54%
2017	742	−0.56%
2023	695	−1.08%
Source: INSEE

== See also ==
- Communes of the Somme department
