= Vaudricourt, Somme =

Vaudricourt
- Commune
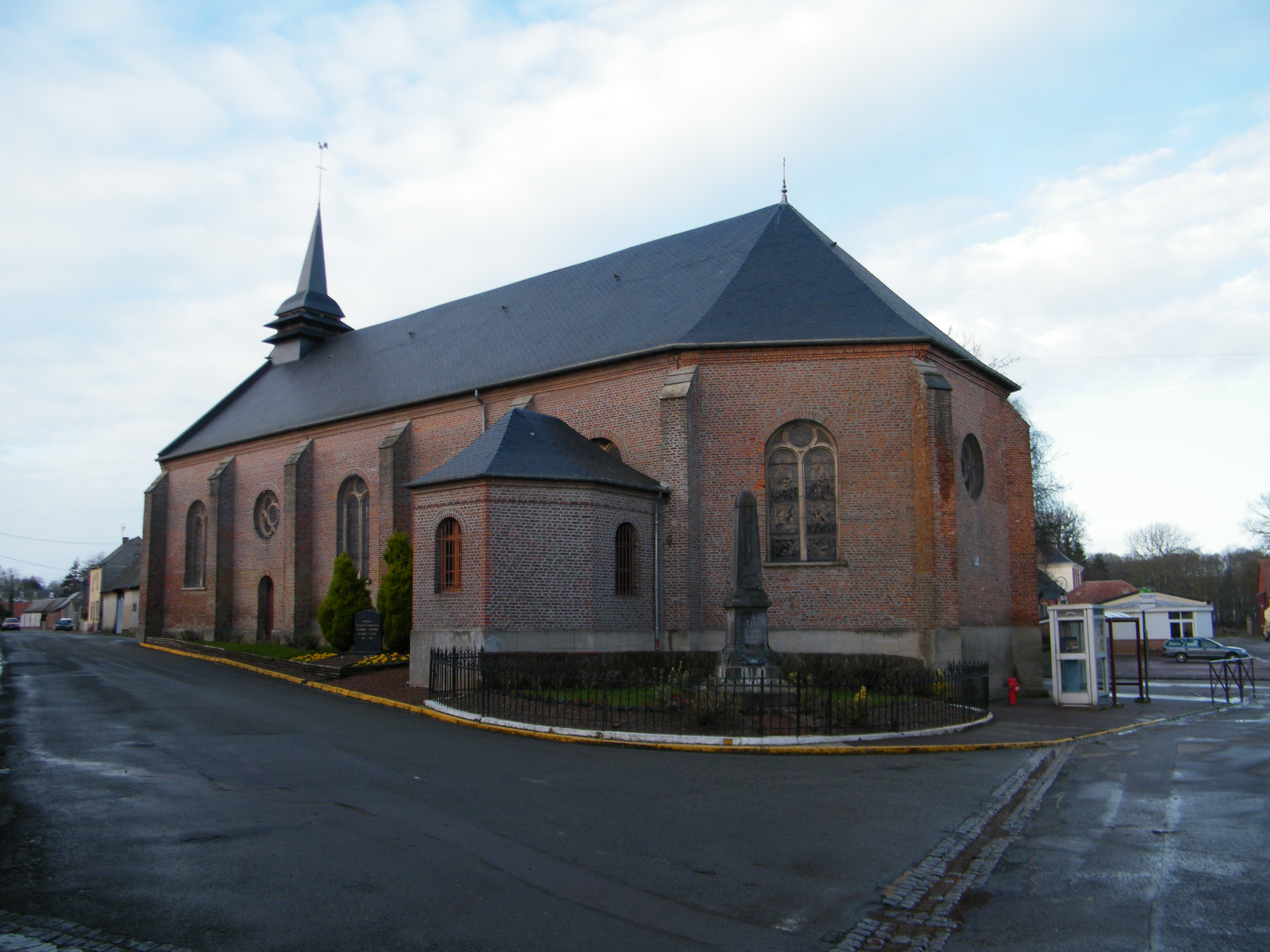
- The church in Vaudricourt

- Coat of arms
- Location of Vaudricourt
- Location within France Location within Hauts-de-France
- Coordinates: 50°07′17″N 1°33′01″E
- Country: France
- Region: Hauts-de-France
- Department: Somme
- Arrondissement: Abbeville
- Canton: Friville-Escarbotin
- Intercommunality: CA Baie de Somme

Government
  - Mayor (2020–2026): Dominique Henocque
- Area^{1}: 2.98 km^{2} (1.15 sq mi)
- Elevation: 27 m (89 ft)
- Highest elevation: 68 m (223 ft)
- Lowest elevation: 37 m (121 ft)
- Population (2023): 414
  - Density: 139/km^{2} (360/sq mi)
- Time zone: UTC+01:00 (CET)
  - Summer (DST): UTC+02:00 (CEST)
- INSEE/Postal code: 80780 /80230
- ^{1} French Land Register data, which excludes lakes, ponds, glaciers > 1 km^{2} (0.386 sq mi or 247 acres) and river estuaries.

Vaudricourt (French pronunciation: [vodʁikuʁ]) is a commune in the Somme department in Hauts-de-France in northern France.

== Geography ==
Vaudricourt is situated 10 miles (16 km) west of Abbeville, on the D106 and the D63 roads.

== Population ==
Historical population
Year	Pop.	±% p.a.
1968	404	—
1975	384	−0.72%
1982	457	+2.52%
1990	465	+0.22%
1999	451	−0.34%
2007	437	−0.39%
2012	401	−1.70%
2017	395	−0.30%
2023	414	+0.79%
Source: INSEE

== See also ==
- Communes of the Somme department
