= Woignarue =

- Commune
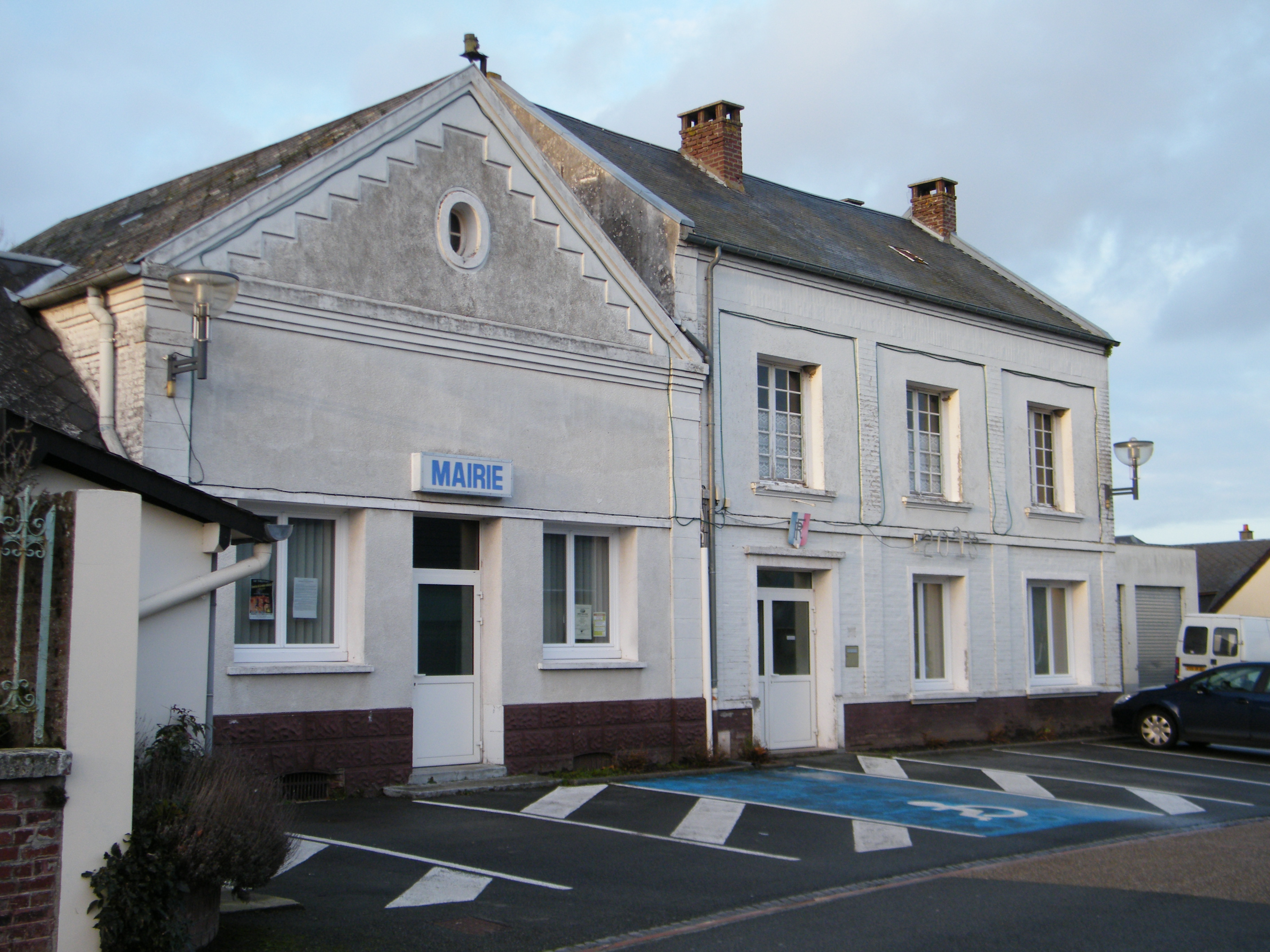
- The town hall in Woignarue

- Coat of arms
- Location of Woignarue
- Location within France Location within Hauts-de-France
- Coordinates: 50°06′38″N 1°29′46″E
- Country: France
- Region: Hauts-de-France
- Department: Somme
- Arrondissement: Abbeville
- Canton: Friville-Escarbotin
- Intercommunality: Villes Sœurs

Government
  - Mayor (2020–2026): Dominique Mallet
- Area^{1}: 16.51 km^{2} (6.37 sq mi)
- Elevation: 60 m (200 ft)
- Highest elevation: 87 m (285 ft)
- Lowest elevation: 0 m (0 ft)
- Population (2023): 732
  - Density: 44.3/km^{2} (115/sq mi)
- Time zone: UTC+01:00 (CET)
  - Summer (DST): UTC+02:00 (CEST)
- INSEE/Postal code: 80826 /80460
- ^{1} French Land Register data, which excludes lakes, ponds, glaciers > 1 km^{2} (0.386 sq mi or 247 acres) and river estuaries.

Woignarue (French pronunciation: [waɲaʁy]; Picard: Wégnérue) is a commune in the Somme department in Hauts-de-France in northern France.

== Geography ==
Woignarue is situated 24 km (15 mi) west of Abbeville, on the D463 road

== Population ==
Historical population
| Year | Pop. | ±% p.a. |
|---|---|---|
| 1968 | 762 | — |
| 1975 | 756 | −0.11% |
| 1982 | 735 | −0.40% |
| 1990 | 708 | −0.47% |
| 1999 | 735 | +0.42% |
| 2007 | 802 | +1.10% |
| 2012 | 837 | +0.86% |
| 2017 | 816 | −0.51% |
| 2023 | 732 | −1.79% |
Source: INSEE

== See also ==
- Communes of the Somme department
