= Canton of Friville-Escarbotin =

Coordinates: 50°5′29″N 1°33′2″E

Friville-Escarbotin
- Canton
- Interactive map of Friville-Escarbotin
- Country: France
- Region: Hauts-de-France
- Department: Somme
- No. of communes: {{{nbcomm}}}
- Area: 185.84 km^{2} (71.75 sq mi)
- Population (2023): 25,522
  - Density: 137.33/km^{2} (355.69/sq mi)
- INSEE code: 80 16

The Canton of Friville-Escarbotin is a canton situated in the department of the Somme and in the Hauts-de-France region of northern France.

== Geography ==
The canton is organised around the commune of Friville-Escarbotin in the arrondissement of Abbeville.

== Composition ==
At the French canton reorganisation which came into effect in March 2015, the canton was expanded from 9 to 24 communes:

- Allenay
- Ault
- Béthencourt-sur-Mer
- Bourseville
- Brutelles
- Cayeux-sur-Mer
- Fressenneville
- Friaucourt
- Friville-Escarbotin
- Lanchères
- Méneslies
- Mers-les-Bains
- Nibas
- Ochancourt
- Oust-Marest
- Pendé
- Saint-Blimont
- Saint-Quentin-la-Motte-Croix-au-Bailly
- Tully
- Valines
- Vaudricourt
- Woignarue
- Woincourt
- Yzengremer

== Population ==
Historical population
Year	Pop.	±% p.a.
2013	27,685	—
2018	26,546	−0.84%
Source: INSEE

== See also ==
- Arrondissements of the Somme department
- Cantons of the Somme department
- Communes of the Somme department
