= Communauté de communes du Vimeu Vert =

Coordinates: 50.071°N 1.7498°E

Vimeu Vert
- Former communauté de communes
- Interactive map of Vimeu Vert
- Country: France
- Region: Hauts-de-France
- Department: Somme
- No. of communes: {{{nbcomm}}}
- Disbanded: 2017

The Communauté de communes du Vimeu Vert is a former communauté de communes in the Somme département and in the Picardie région of France. It was created in December 1993. It was merged into the new Communauté de communes du Vimeu in January 2017.

== Composition ==
This Communauté de communes included 12 communes:

1. Acheux-en-Vimeu
2. Béhen
3. Cahon
4. Ercourt
5. Grébault-Mesnil
6. Huchenneville
7. Miannay
8. Moyenneville
9. Quesnoy-le-Montant
10. Saint-Maxent
11. Tœufles
12. Tours-en-Vimeu

== See also ==
- Communes of the Somme department
