= Canton of Moyenneville =

Coordinates: 50°4′22″N 1°45′2″E

Moyenneville
- Former canton
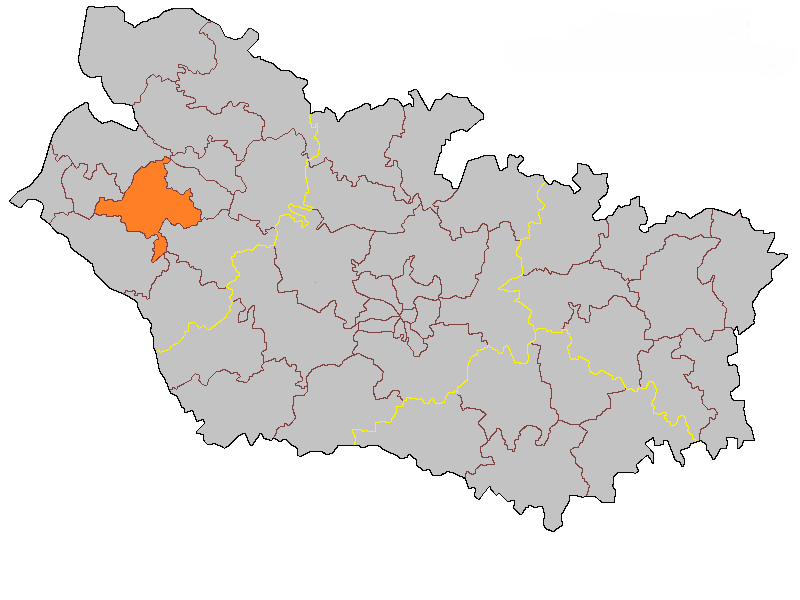
- Country: France
- Region: Hauts-de-France
- Department: Somme
- No. of communes: {{{nbcomm}}}
- Disbanded: 2015
- Area: 121.48 km^{2} (46.90 sq mi)
- Population (2012): 9,426
  - Density: 77.59/km^{2} (201.0/sq mi)

The Canton of Moyenneville is a former canton situated in the department of the Somme and in the Picardie region of northern France. It was disbanded following the French canton reorganisation which came into effect in March 2015. It had 9,426 inhabitants (2012).

== Geography ==
The canton is organised around the commune of Moyenneville in the arrondissement of Abbeville. The altitude varies from 3m at Cahon to 121m at Feuquières-en-Vimeu for an average of 77m.

The canton comprised 14 communes:

- Acheux-en-Vimeu
- Béhen
- Cahon
- Chépy
- Ercourt
- Feuquières-en-Vimeu
- Grébault-Mesnil
- Huchenneville
- Miannay
- Moyenneville
- Quesnoy-le-Montant
- Saint-Maxent
- Tœufles
- Tours-en-Vimeu

== Population ==
1962	1968	1975	1982	1990	1999
8068	8413	8686	8721	8780	8817
Census count starting from 1962 : Population without double counting

== See also ==
- Arrondissements of the Somme department
- Cantons of the Somme department
- Communes of the Somme department
