= Canton of Abbeville-Sud =

Coordinates: 50°6′21″N 1°50′9″E

Abbeville-Sud
- Former canton
- Interactive map of Abbeville-Sud
- Country: France
- Region: Hauts-de-France
- Department: Somme
- No. of communes: {{{nbcomm}}}
- Disbanded: 2015
- Population (2012): 13,960

The Canton of Abbeville-Sud is a former canton situated in the department of the Somme and in the Picardy region of northern France. It was disbanded following the French canton reorganisation which came into effect in March 2015. It had 13,960 inhabitants (2012).

== Geography ==
The canton is organised around the commune of Abbeville in the arrondissement of Abbeville. The altitude varies from 2m at Abbeville to 104m at Bray-lès-Mareuil.

The canton comprised 7 communes:

- Abbeville (partly)
- Bray-lès-Mareuil
- Cambron
- Eaucourt-sur-Somme
- Épagne-Épagnette
- Mareuil-Caubert
- Yonval

== See also ==
- Arrondissements of the Somme department
- Cantons of the Somme department
- Communes of the Somme department
