= Communauté de communes du Vimeu Industriel =

Coordinates: 50.083°N 1.5449°E

Vimeu Industriel
- Former communauté de communes
- Interactive map of Vimeu Industriel
- Country: France
- Region: Hauts-de-France
- Department: Somme
- No. of communes: {{{nbcomm}}}
- Established: 1996
- Disbanded: 2017

The Communauté de communes du Vimeu Industriel is a former communauté de communes in the Somme département and in the Picardie région of France. It was created in December 1996. It was merged into the new Communauté de communes du Vimeu in January 2017.

== Composition ==
This Communauté de communes included 14 communes:

1. Aigneville
2. Béthencourt-sur-Mer
3. Bourseville
4. Chépy
5. Feuquières-en-Vimeu
6. Fressenneville
7. Friville-Escarbotin
8. Méneslies
9. Nibas
10. Ochancourt
11. Tully
12. Valines
13. Woincourt
14. Yzengremer

== See also ==
- Communes of the Somme department
