= Cambrón =

Cambrón is a common name for several plants, derived from the Spanish language:

- Certain algarrobo, bayahonda and mesquite trees (Prosopis species) in the Fabaceae
- Certain acacias (e.g. Acacia macracantha and Acacia farnesiana) in the Fabaceae
- Rhamnus cathartica in the Rhamnaceae

== See also ==
- Cambron
