= Communauté de communes du Vimeu =

Federation of municipalities in France

Coordinates: 50.09°N 1.54°E

Vimeu
- Communauté de communes
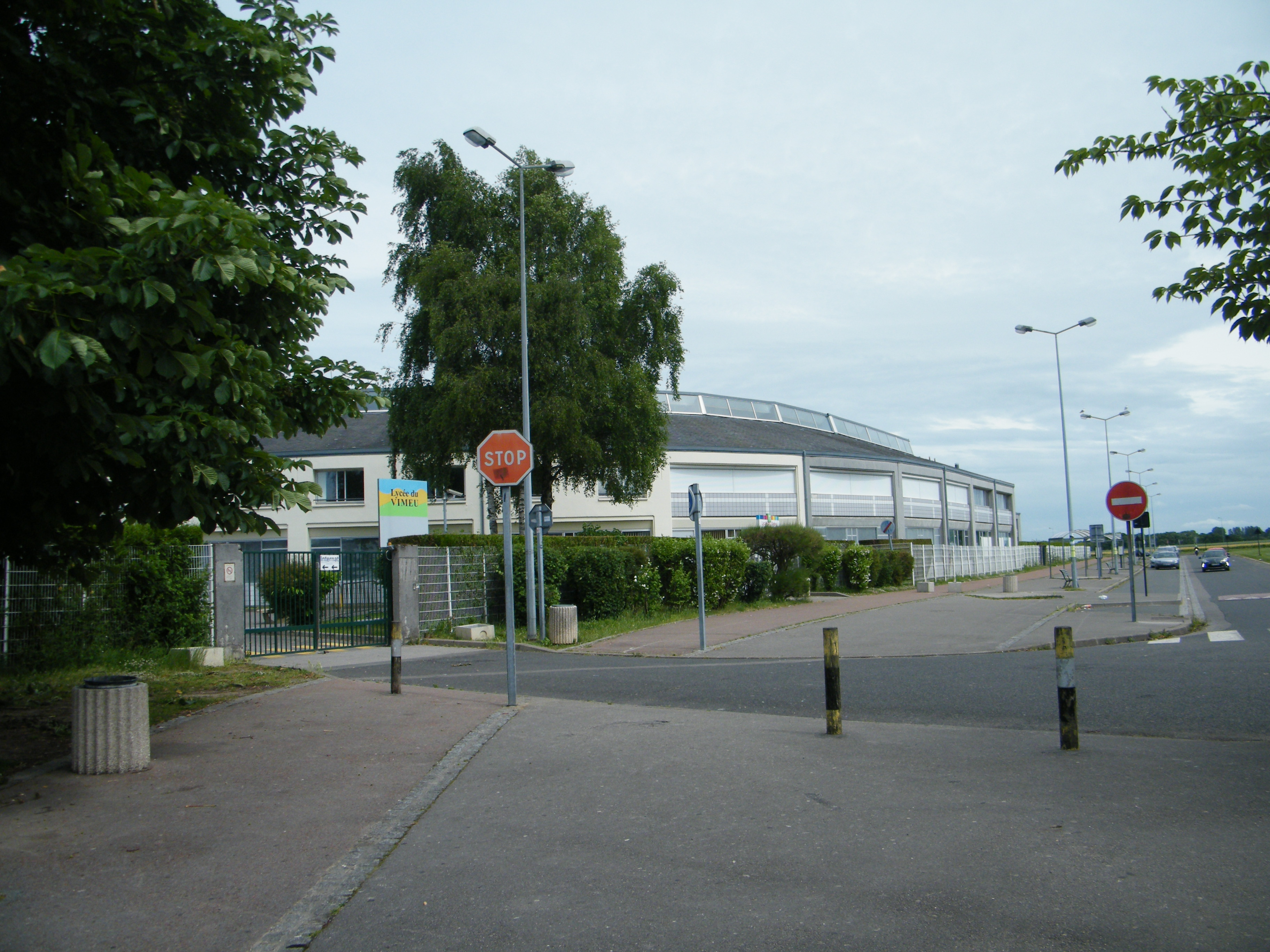
- Vimeo aquatic center.
- Country: France
- Region: Hauts-de-France
- Department: Somme
- No. of communes: {{{nbcomm}}}
- Established: 1 January 2017

Government
  - President: Jean-Pierre Boudinelle
- Area: 189.80 km^{2} (73.28 sq mi)
- Population (2018): 22,641
  - Density: 119.29/km^{2} (308.96/sq mi)

The Communauté de communes du Vimeu is a communauté de communes in the Somme département and in the Hauts-de-France région of France. It was formed on 1 January 2017 by the merger of the former Communauté de communes du Vimeu Industriel and the Communauté de communes du Vimeu Vert. Its seat is in Friville-Escarbotin.

== Territorial community ==
=== Geography ===
The territory of the communauté de communes corresponds to the communes of the two previous communautés which it brought together:

- Communauté de communes du Vimeu Industriel
- Communauté de communes du Vimeu Vert

=== Composition ===
The communauté de communes currently consists of the following 25 communes:

List of communes of the Communauté de communes du Vimeu
Name	Code INSEE	Demonym	Area (km^{2})	Population (2019)	Density (per km^{2})
Friville-Escarbotin (Seat)	80368	Frivillois	8.86	4,491	507
Acheux-en-Vimeu	80004	Achéens	12.33	511	41
Aigneville	80008	Aignevillois	10.76	896	83
Béhen	80076	Béhennois	9.83	516	52
Béthencourt-sur-Mer	80096	Béthencourtois	2.95	942	319
Bourseville	80124	Boursevillois	8.07	704	87
Cahon	80161	Cahonnais	7.04	205	29
Chépy	80190	Chépois	7.35	1,231	167
Ercourt	80280	Ercourtois	4.2	123	29
Feuquières-en-Vimeu	80308	Feuquiérois	7.99	2,499	313
Fressenneville	80360	Fressennevillois	8.66	2,181	252
Grébault-Mesnil	80388		2.58	213	83
Huchenneville	80444	Huchennevillois	11.54	661	57
Méneslies	80527	Menesliens	4.04	303	75
Miannay	80546		8.81	584	66
Moyenneville	80578	Moyennevillois	14.12	719	51
Nibas	80597	Nibasiens	12.65	852	67
Ochancourt	80603	Ochancourtois	3.95	334	85
Quesnoy-le-Montant	80654	Quercitains	7.04	543	77
Tœufles	80764		8.88	296	33
Tours-en-Vimeu	80765		13.39	809	60
Tully	80770	Tullysiens	1.88	538	286
Valines	80775	Valinois	5.25	632	120
Woincourt	80827	Woincourtois	4.18	1,239	296
Yzengremer	80834		3.4	514	151

== Organisation ==
=== Seat ===
The seat of the communauté is fixed in Friville-Escarbotin at 18 rue Albert Thomas.

=== List of presidents ===
List of successive presidents of the Communauté de communes du Vimeu
In office		Name	Party	Capacity	Ref.
5 January 2017	31 March 2021	Bernard Davergne	PS	Mayor of Feuquières-en-Vimeu (2001—2021); General councilor of Moyenneville (2009—2015); Departmental councilor of Gamaches (2015—2021); President of the CC du Vimeu Industriel (2008—2016)	
15 April 2021	Present	Jean-Pierre Boudinelle		Deputy Mayor of Valines	
