= Yonval =

- Commune
- The town hall in Yonval

- Coat of arms
- Location of Yonval
- Location within France Location within Hauts-de-France
- Coordinates: 50°05′23″N 1°47′24″E
- Country: France
- Region: Hauts-de-France
- Department: Somme
- Arrondissement: Abbeville
- Canton: Abbeville-2
- Intercommunality: Baie de Somme

Government
  - Mayor (2020–2026): Christian Lesenne
- Area^{1}: 3.93 km^{2} (1.52 sq mi)
- Elevation: 12 m (39 ft)
- Highest elevation: 82 m (269 ft)
- Lowest elevation: 6 m (20 ft)
- Population (2023): 243
  - Density: 61.8/km^{2} (160/sq mi)
- Time zone: UTC+01:00 (CET)
  - Summer (DST): UTC+02:00 (CEST)
- INSEE/Postal code: 80836 /80132
- ^{1} French Land Register data, which excludes lakes, ponds, glaciers > 1 km^{2} (0.386 sq mi or 247 acres) and river estuaries.

Yonval (French pronunciation: [jɔ̃val]) is a commune in the Somme department in Hauts-de-France in northern France.

== Geography ==
Yonval is situated 2 miles (3.2 km) west of the centre of Abbeville, on the D22a road. The commune was created in 1985 when it was separated from the commune of Cambron.

== Population ==
Historical population
Year	Pop.	±% p.a.
1968	135	—
1975	155	+1.99%
1982	180	+2.16%
1990	210	+1.95%
1999	211	+0.05%
2007	237	+1.46%
2012	238	+0.08%
2017	227	−0.94%
2023	243	+1.14%
Source: INSEE

== See also ==
- Communes of the Somme department
