= Estrébœuf =

- Commune
- Location of Estrébœuf
- Location within France Location within Hauts-de-France
- Coordinates: 50°09′25″N 1°37′07″E
- Country: France
- Region: Hauts-de-France
- Department: Somme
- Arrondissement: Abbeville
- Canton: Abbeville-2
- Intercommunality: CA Baie de Somme

Government
  - Mayor (2020–2026): Jean-Marie Machat
- Area^{1}: 6.24 km^{2} (2.41 sq mi)
- Elevation: 14 m (46 ft)
- Highest elevation: 47 m (154 ft)
- Lowest elevation: 2 m (6.6 ft)
- Population (2023): 244
  - Density: 39.1/km^{2} (101/sq mi)
- Time zone: UTC+01:00 (CET)
  - Summer (DST): UTC+02:00 (CEST)
- INSEE/Postal code: 80287 /80230
- ^{1} French Land Register data, which excludes lakes, ponds, glaciers > 1 km^{2} (0.386 sq mi or 247 acres) and river estuaries.

Estrébœuf (Picard: Détèrbeu ) is a commune in the Somme département in Hauts-de-France in northern France.

== Geography ==
The commune is situated on the D48 road, 2 miles (3 km) from the Somme estuary and 10 miles (16 km) northwest of Abbeville.

== Population ==
Historical population
Year	Pop.	±% p.a.
1968	277	—
1975	225	−2.93%
1982	232	+0.44%
1990	196	−2.09%
1999	229	+1.74%
2007	274	+2.27%
2012	248	−1.97%
2017	243	−0.41%
2023	244	+0.07%
Source: INSEE

== See also ==
- Communes of the Somme department
