= Arrondissement of Abbeville =

Coordinates: 50°06′N 1°49′E

Abbeville
- Arrondissement
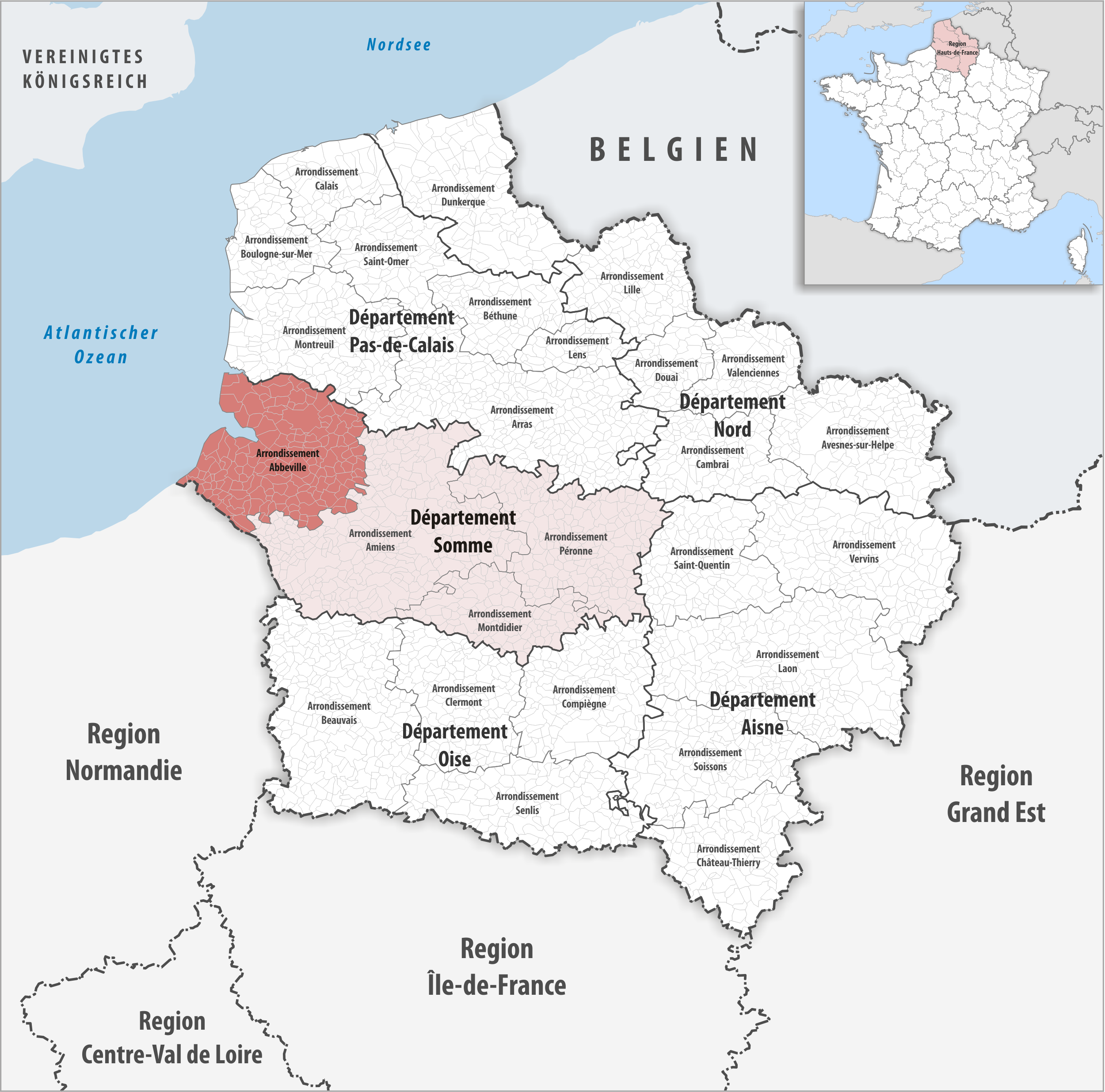
- Location within the region Hauts-de-France
- Country: France
- Region: Hauts-de-France
- Department: Somme
- No. of communes: {{{nbcomm}}}
- Area: 1,560.6 km^{2} (602.6 sq mi)
- Population (2023): 121,053
  - Density: 77.568/km^{2} (200.90/sq mi)
- INSEE code: 801

The arrondissement of Abbeville is an arrondissement in the Somme department in the Hauts-de-France region of France. It has 163 communes. Its population is 122,466 (2021), and its area is 1,560.6 km^{2} (602.6 sq mi).

== Composition ==
The communes of the arrondissement of Abbeville are:

1. Abbeville (80001)
2. Acheux-en-Vimeu (80004)
3. Agenvillers (80006)
4. Aigneville (80008)
5. Ailly-le-Haut-Clocher (80009)
6. Allenay (80018)
7. Allery (80019)
8. Argoules (80025)
9. Arrest (80029)
10. Arry (80030)
11. Ault (80039)
12. Bailleul (80051)
13. Beauchamps (80063)
14. Béhen (80076)
15. Bellancourt (80078)
16. Bernay-en-Ponthieu (80087)
17. Béthencourt-sur-Mer (80096)
18. Bettencourt-Rivière (80099)
19. Biencourt (80104)
20. Le Boisle (80109)
21. Boismont (80110)
22. Boufflers (80118)
23. Bouillancourt-en-Séry (80120)
24. Bourseville (80124)
25. Bouttencourt (80126)
26. Bouvaincourt-sur-Bresle (80127)
27. Brailly-Cornehotte (80133)
28. Bray-lès-Mareuil (80135)
29. Brucamps (80145)
30. Brutelles (80146)
31. Buigny-l'Abbé (80147)
32. Buigny-lès-Gamaches (80148)
33. Buigny-Saint-Maclou (80149)
34. Bussus-lès-Yaucourt (80155)
35. Cahon (80161)
36. Cambron (80163)
37. Canchy (80167)
38. Caours (80171)
39. Cayeux-sur-Mer (80182)
40. Chépy (80190)
41. Citerne (80196)
42. Cocquerel (80200)
43. Condé-Folie (80205)
44. Coulonvillers (80215)
45. Cramont (80221)
46. Crécy-en-Ponthieu (80222)
47. Le Crotoy (80228)
48. Dargnies (80235)
49. Dominois (80244)
50. Dompierre-sur-Authie (80248)
51. Domqueur (80249)
52. Domvast (80250)
53. Doudelainville (80251)
54. Drucat (80260)
55. Eaucourt-sur-Somme (80262)
56. Embreville (80265)
57. Épagne-Épagnette (80268)
58. Ercourt (80280)
59. Ergnies (80281)
60. Érondelle (80282)
61. Estrébœuf (80287)
62. Estrées-lès-Crécy (80290)
63. Favières (80303)
64. Feuquières-en-Vimeu (80308)
65. Fontaine-sur-Maye (80327)
66. Fontaine-sur-Somme (80328)
67. Forest-l'Abbaye (80331)
68. Forest-Montiers (80332)
69. Fort-Mahon-Plage (80333)
70. Francières (80344)
71. Franleu (80345)
72. Fressenneville (80360)
73. Frettemeule (80362)
74. Friaucourt (80364)
75. Friville-Escarbotin (80368)
76. Froyelles (80371)
77. Frucourt (80372)
78. Gamaches (80373)
79. Gapennes (80374)
80. Gorenflos (80380)
81. Grand-Laviers (80385)
82. Grébault-Mesnil (80388)
83. Gueschart (80396)
84. Hallencourt (80406)
85. Hautvillers-Ouville (80422)
86. Huchenneville (80444)
87. Huppy (80446)
88. Lamotte-Buleux (80462)
89. Lanchères (80464)
90. Liercourt (80476)
91. Ligescourt (80477)
92. Limeux (80482)
93. Long (80486)
94. Longpré-les-Corps-Saints (80488)
95. Machiel (80496)
96. Machy (80497)
97. Maisnières (80500)
98. Maison-Ponthieu (80501)
99. Maison-Roland (80502)
100. Mareuil-Caubert (80512)
101. Martainneville (80518)
102. Méneslies (80527)
103. Mérélessart (80529)
104. Mers-les-Bains (80533)
105. Mesnil-Domqueur (80537)
106. Miannay (80546)
107. Millencourt-en-Ponthieu (80548)
108. Mons-Boubert (80556)
109. Mouflers (80574)
110. Moyenneville (80578)
111. Nampont (80580)
112. Neufmoulin (80588)
113. Neuilly-le-Dien (80589)
114. Neuilly-l'Hôpital (80590)
115. Nibas (80597)
116. Nouvion (80598)
117. Noyelles-en-Chaussée (80599)
118. Noyelles-sur-Mer (80600)
119. Ochancourt (80603)
120. Oneux (80609)
121. Oust-Marest (80613)
122. Pendé (80618)
123. Ponches-Estruval (80631)
124. Ponthoile (80633)
125. Pont-Remy (80635)
126. Port-le-Grand (80637)
127. Quend (80649)
128. Quesnoy-le-Montant (80654)
129. Ramburelles (80662)
130. Regnière-Écluse (80665)
131. Rue (80688)
132. Saigneville (80691)
133. Sailly-Flibeaucourt (80692)
134. Saint-Blimont (80700)
135. Saint-Maxent (80710)
136. Saint-Quentin-en-Tourmont (80713)
137. Saint-Quentin-la-Motte-Croix-au-Bailly (80714)
138. Saint-Riquier (80716)
139. Saint-Valery-sur-Somme (80721)
140. Sorel-en-Vimeu (80736)
141. Tilloy-Floriville (80760)
142. Le Titre (80763)
143. Tœufles (80764)
144. Tours-en-Vimeu (80765)
145. Tully (80770)
146. Valines (80775)
147. Vauchelles-les-Quesnoy (80779)
148. Vaudricourt (80780)
149. Vaux-Marquenneville (80783)
150. Vercourt (80787)
151. Villers-sous-Ailly (80804)
152. Villers-sur-Authie (80806)
153. Vironchaux (80808)
154. Vismes (80809)
155. Vitz-sur-Authie (80810)
156. Vron (80815)
157. Wiry-au-Mont (80825)
158. Woignarue (80826)
159. Woincourt (80827)
160. Yonval (80836)
161. Yvrench (80832)
162. Yvrencheux (80833)
163. Yzengremer (80834)

== History ==
The arrondissement of Abbeville was created in 1800. In January 2009 the canton of Oisemont passed from the arrondissement of Amiens to the arrondissement of Abbeville. At the January 2017 reorganisation of the arrondissements of Somme, it received two communes from the arrondissement of Amiens, and it lost 38 communes to the arrondissement of Amiens.

As a result of the reorganisation of the cantons of France which came into effect in 2015, the borders of the cantons are no longer related to the borders of the arrondissements. The cantons of the arrondissement of Abbeville were, as of January 2015:

1. Abbeville-Nord
2. Abbeville-Sud
3. Ailly-le-Haut-Clocher
4. Ault
5. Crécy-en-Ponthieu
6. Friville-Escarbotin
7. Gamaches
8. Hallencourt
9. Moyenneville
10. Nouvion
11. Oisemont
12. Rue
13. Saint-Valery-sur-Somme
