= Canton of Abbeville-2 =

Coordinates: 50.10°N 1.83°E

The canton of Abbeville-2 is an administrative division of the Somme department, in northern France. It was created at the French canton reorganisation which came into effect in March 2015. Its seat is in Abbeville.

It consists of the following communes:

1. Abbeville (partly)
2. Acheux-en-Vimeu
3. Arrest
4. Béhen
5. Boismont
6. Bray-lès-Mareuil
7. Cahon
8. Cambron
9. Eaucourt-sur-Somme
10. Épagne-Épagnette
11. Ercourt
12. Estrébœuf
13. Franleu
14. Grébault-Mesnil
15. Huchenneville
16. Mareuil-Caubert
17. Miannay
18. Mons-Boubert
19. Moyenneville
20. Quesnoy-le-Montant
21. Saigneville
22. Saint-Valery-sur-Somme
23. Tœufles
24. Tours-en-Vimeu
25. Yonval
