= Aigneville =

Commune in Hauts-de-France, France

- Commune
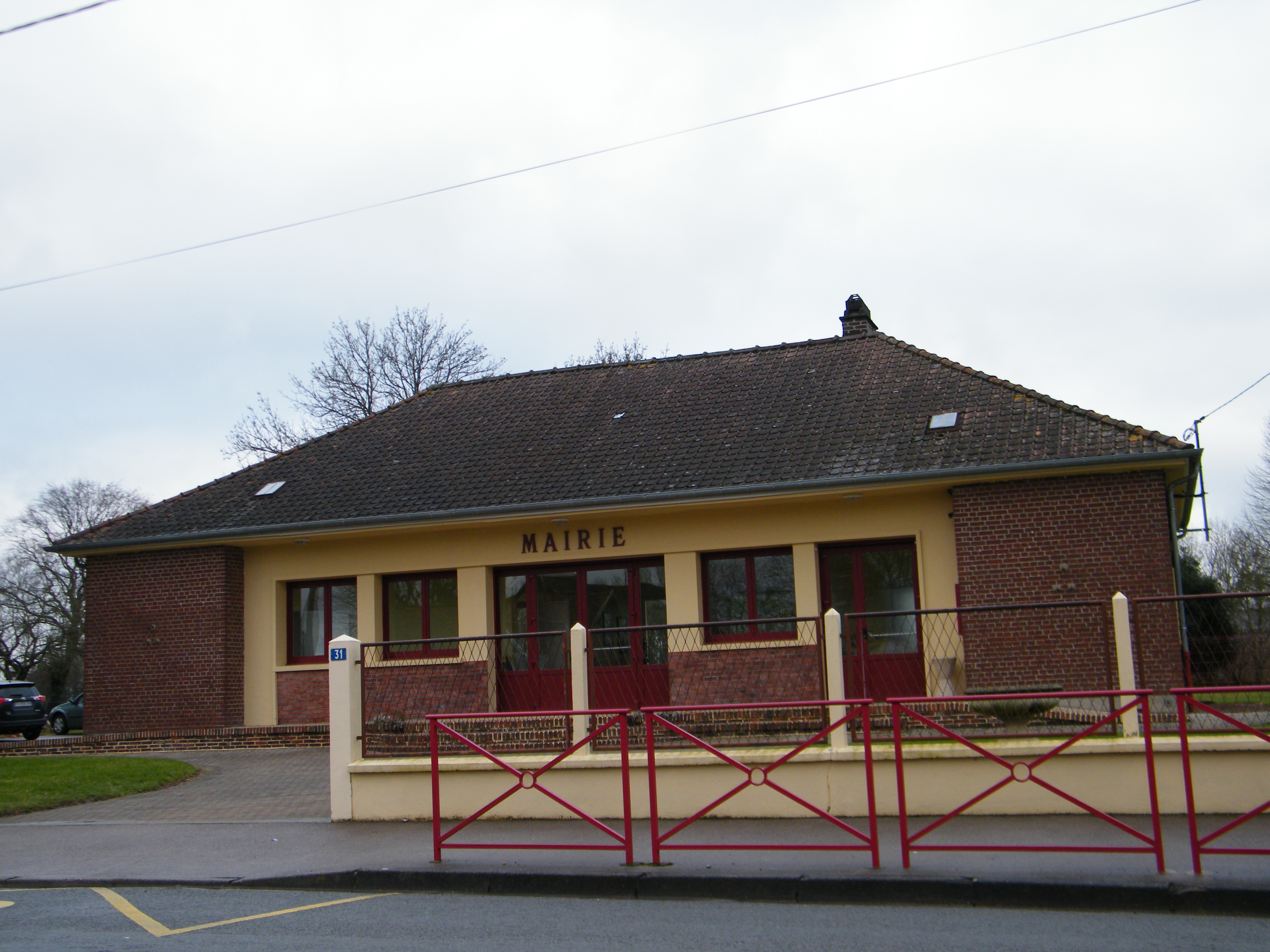
- The town hall of Aigneville

- Coat of arms
- Location of Aigneville
- Location within France Location within Hauts-de-France
- Coordinates: 50°02′09″N 1°37′03″E
- Country: France
- Region: Hauts-de-France
- Department: Somme
- Arrondissement: Abbeville
- Canton: Gamaches
- Intercommunality: Vimeu

Government
  - Mayor (2020–2026): Michel Dequevauviller
- Area^{1}: 10.76 km^{2} (4.15 sq mi)
- Elevation: 114 m (374 ft)
- Highest elevation: 124 m (407 ft)
- Lowest elevation: 89 m (292 ft)
- Population (2023): 904
  - Density: 84.0/km^{2} (218/sq mi)
- Time zone: UTC+01:00 (CET)
  - Summer (DST): UTC+02:00 (CEST)
- INSEE/Postal code: 80008 /80210
- ^{1} French Land Register data, which excludes lakes, ponds, glaciers > 1 km^{2} (0.386 sq mi or 247 acres) and river estuaries.

Aigneville (French pronunciation: [ɛɲvil]; Picard: Aingville) is a commune in the Somme department in Hauts-de-France in northern France.

== Geography ==
The commune lies about 30 km (19 mi) southwest of Abbeville, at the junction of the departmental roads D67 and D65.

== Population ==
Historical population
Year	Pop.	±% p.a.
1968	663	—
1975	658	−0.11%
1982	630	−0.62%
1990	635	+0.10%
1999	658	+0.40%
2007	827	+2.90%
2012	868	+0.97%
2017	890	+0.50%
2023	904	+0.26%
Source: INSEE

== See also ==
Communes of the Somme department
