= Épagne-Épagnette =

- Commune
- Coat of arms
- Location of Épagne-Épagnette
- Location within France Location within Hauts-de-France
- Coordinates: 50°04′23″N 1°52′23″E
- Country: France
- Region: Hauts-de-France
- Department: Somme
- Arrondissement: Abbeville
- Canton: Abbeville-2
- Intercommunality: CA Baie de Somme

Government
  - Mayor (2020–2026): Pascal Lefebvre
- Area^{1}: 6.56 km^{2} (2.53 sq mi)
- Elevation: 14 m (46 ft)
- Highest elevation: 93 m (305 ft)
- Lowest elevation: 3 m (9.8 ft)
- Population (2023): 510
  - Density: 78/km^{2} (200/sq mi)
- Time zone: UTC+01:00 (CET)
  - Summer (DST): UTC+02:00 (CEST)
- INSEE/Postal code: 80268 /80580
- ^{1} French Land Register data, which excludes lakes, ponds, glaciers > 1 km^{2} (0.386 sq mi or 247 acres) and river estuaries.

Épagne-Épagnette (French pronunciation: [epaɲ epaɲɛt]) is a commune in the Somme department in Hauts-de-France in northern France.

== Geography ==
Épagne-Épagnette is situated on the banks of the river Somme some 6 km (3.7 mi) southeast of Abbeville on the D901 road.

== Population ==
Historical population
Year	Pop.	±% p.a.
1968	441	—
1975	469	+0.88%
1982	408	−1.97%
1990	581	+4.52%
1999	552	−0.57%
2007	574	+0.49%
2012	580	+0.21%
2017	544	−1.27%
2023	510	−1.07%
Source: INSEE

== See also ==
- Communes of the Somme department
