= Arrest, Somme =

Arrest
- Commune
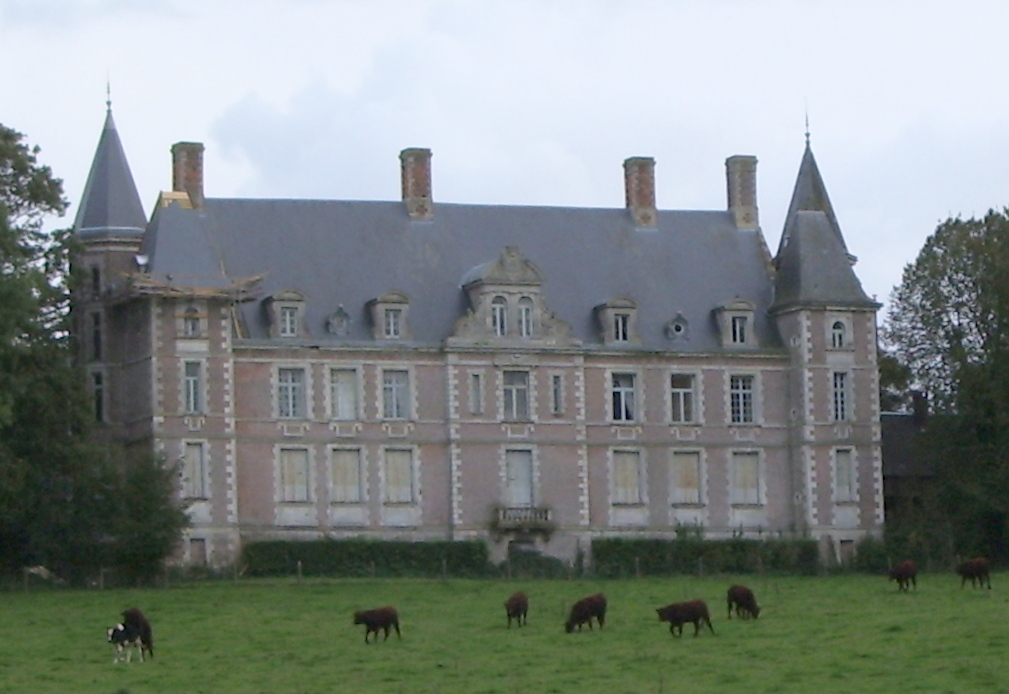
- The château of Arrest

- Coat of arms
- Location of Arrest
- Location within France Location within Hauts-de-France
- Coordinates: 50°07′48″N 1°37′03″E
- Country: France
- Region: Hauts-de-France
- Department: Somme
- Arrondissement: Abbeville
- Canton: Abbeville-2
- Intercommunality: CA Baie de Somme

Government
  - Mayor (2020–2026): Armel Bouchard
- Area^{1}: 11.15 km^{2} (4.31 sq mi)
- Elevation: 54 m (177 ft)
- Highest elevation: 72 m (236 ft)
- Lowest elevation: 7 m (23 ft)
- Population (2023): 820
  - Density: 74/km^{2} (190/sq mi)
- Time zone: UTC+01:00 (CET)
  - Summer (DST): UTC+02:00 (CEST)
- INSEE/Postal code: 80029 /80820
- ^{1} French Land Register data, which excludes lakes, ponds, glaciers > 1 km^{2} (0.386 sq mi or 247 acres) and river estuaries.

Arrest is a commune in the Somme department in Hauts-de-France in northern France.

== See also ==
- Communes of the Somme department
