= Acheux-en-Vimeu =

Commune in Hauts-de-France, France

- Commune
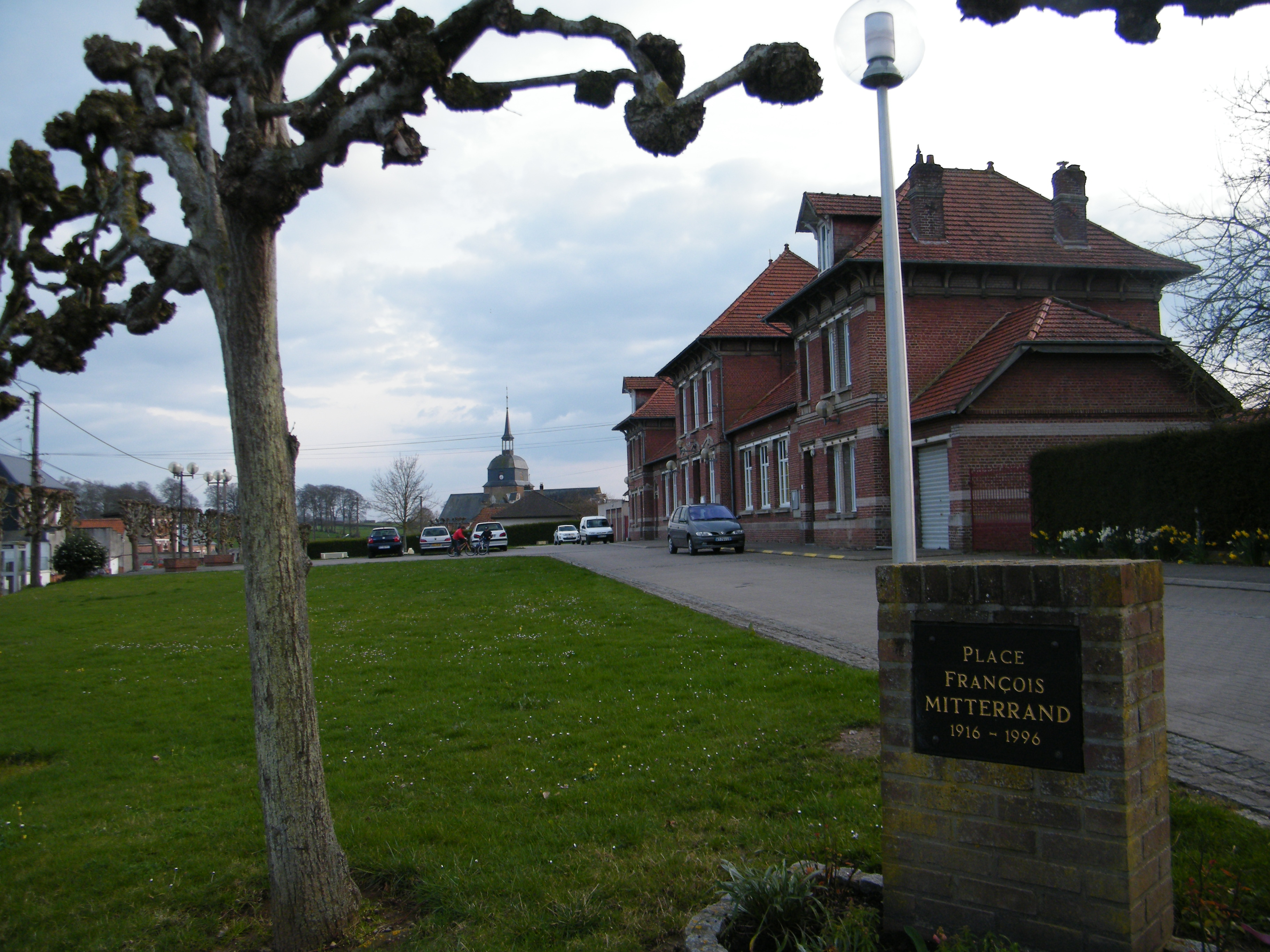
- The town hall and school of Acheux-en-Vimeu

- Coat of arms
- Location of Acheux-en-Vimeu
- Location within France Location within Hauts-de-France
- Coordinates: 50°03′58″N 1°40′41″E
- Country: France
- Region: Hauts-de-France
- Department: Somme
- Arrondissement: Abbeville
- Canton: Abbeville-2
- Intercommunality: Vimeu

Government
  - Mayor (2020–2026): Jean-Charles Martel
- Area^{1}: 12.33 km^{2} (4.76 sq mi)
- Elevation: 92 m (302 ft)
- Highest elevation: 111 m (364 ft)
- Lowest elevation: 38 m (125 ft)
- Population (2023): 501
  - Density: 40.6/km^{2} (105/sq mi)
- Time zone: UTC+01:00 (CET)
  - Summer (DST): UTC+02:00 (CEST)
- INSEE/Postal code: 80004 /80210
- ^{1} French Land Register data, which excludes lakes, ponds, glaciers > 1 km^{2} (0.386 sq mi or 247 acres) and river estuaries.

Acheux-en-Vimeu (French pronunciation: [aʃø ɑ̃ vimø], literally Acheux in Vimeu) is a commune in the Somme department in Hauts-de-France in northern France.

== Geography ==
The commune is a farming village 10 kilometres (6.2 mi) southwest of Abbeville, on the D80 departmental road. The commune comprises several small hamlets, one of which is Frireulle, where the church has a modest wall belltower.

== History ==
The earlier spelling of the name Acheux was either Aceu or Acheu. It comes from the Celtic Achad that meant "cultivated field".

== Population ==
Historical population
Year	Pop.	±% p.a.
1968	543	—
1975	538	−0.13%
1982	537	−0.03%
1990	527	−0.23%
1999	503	−0.52%
2007	502	−0.02%
2012	523	+0.82%
2017	528	+0.19%
2023	501	−0.87%
Source: INSEE

== See also ==
Communes of the Somme department
