= Mons-Boubert =

- Commune
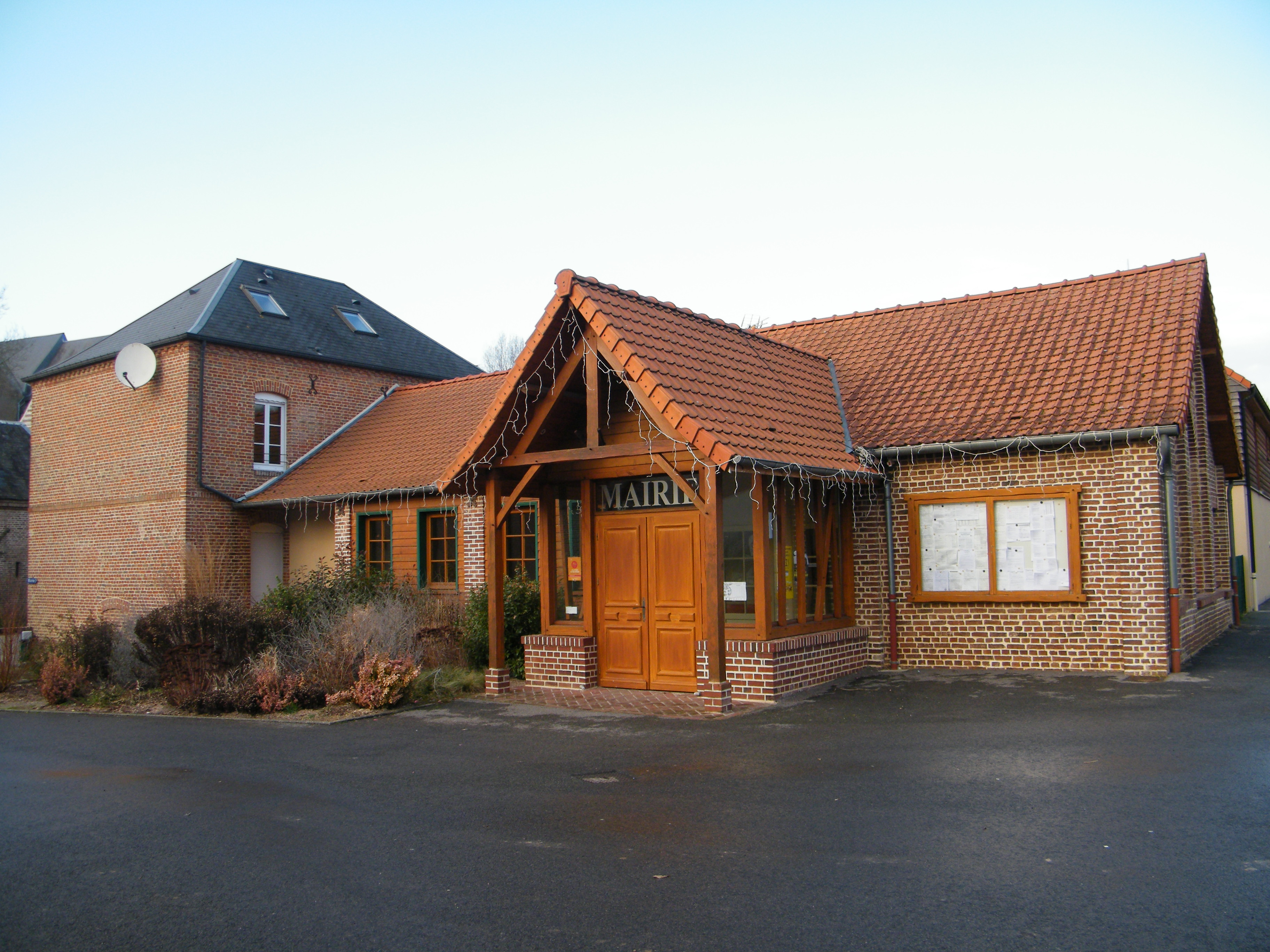
- The town hall in Mons-Boubert
- Location of Mons-Boubert
- Location within France Location within Hauts-de-France
- Coordinates: 50°07′47″N 1°39′43″E
- Country: France
- Region: Hauts-de-France
- Department: Somme
- Arrondissement: Abbeville
- Canton: Abbeville-2
- Intercommunality: CA Baie de Somme

Government
  - Mayor (2020–2026): Emmanuel Delahaye
- Area^{1}: 9.53 km^{2} (3.68 sq mi)
- Elevation: 20 m (66 ft)
- Highest elevation: 71 m (233 ft)
- Lowest elevation: 5 m (16 ft)
- Population (2023): 585
  - Density: 61.4/km^{2} (159/sq mi)
- Time zone: UTC+01:00 (CET)
  - Summer (DST): UTC+02:00 (CEST)
- INSEE/Postal code: 80556 /80210
- ^{1} French Land Register data, which excludes lakes, ponds, glaciers > 1 km^{2} (0.386 sq mi or 247 acres) and river estuaries.

Mons-Boubert (French pronunciation: [mɔ̃s bubɛʁ]; Picard: Monboubért) is a commune in the Somme department in Hauts-de-France in northern France.

== Geography ==
The commune is situated on the D403 road, some 7 miles (11 km) west of Abbeville.

== Population ==
Historical population
Year	Pop.	±% p.a.
1968	567	—
1975	519	−1.26%
1982	508	−0.31%
1990	506	−0.05%
1999	483	−0.52%
2007	537	+1.33%
2012	528	−0.34%
2017	558	+1.11%
2023	585	+0.79%
Source: INSEE

== See also ==
- Communes of the Somme department
