= Tours-en-Vimeu =

- Commune
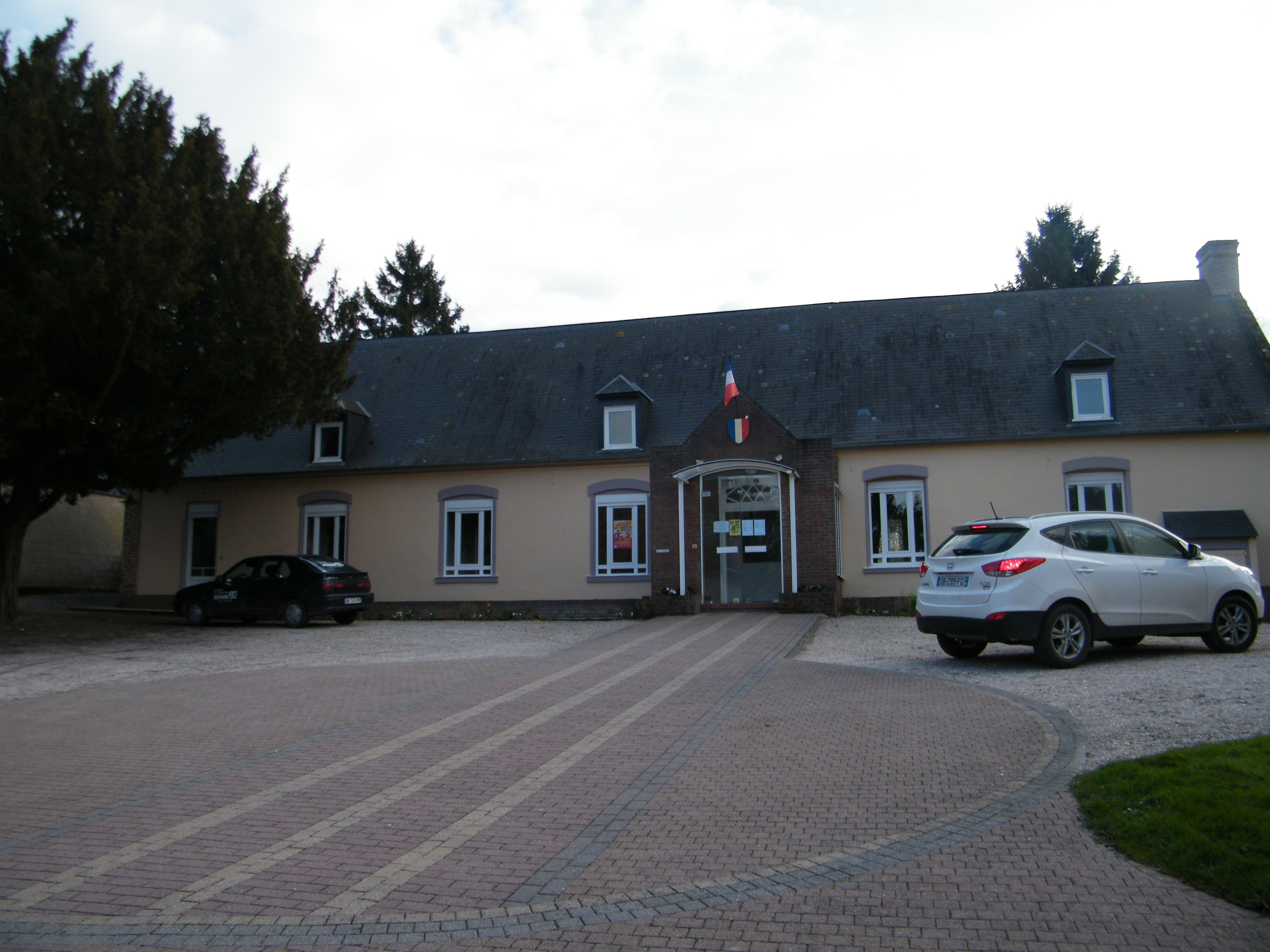
- The town hall in Tours-en-Vimeu

- Coat of arms
- Location of Tours-en-Vimeu
- Location within France Location within Hauts-de-France
- Coordinates: 50°02′14″N 1°40′49″E
- Country: France
- Region: Hauts-de-France
- Department: Somme
- Arrondissement: Abbeville
- Canton: Abbeville-2
- Intercommunality: CC Vimeu

Government
  - Mayor (2020–2026): Olivier Blondel
- Area^{1}: 13.39 km^{2} (5.17 sq mi)
- Elevation: 25 m (82 ft)
- Highest elevation: 116 m (381 ft)
- Lowest elevation: 60 m (200 ft)
- Population (2023): 805
  - Density: 60.1/km^{2} (156/sq mi)
- Time zone: UTC+01:00 (CET)
  - Summer (DST): UTC+02:00 (CEST)
- INSEE/Postal code: 80765 /80210
- ^{1} French Land Register data, which excludes lakes, ponds, glaciers > 1 km^{2} (0.386 sq mi or 247 acres) and river estuaries.

Tours-en-Vimeu (French pronunciation: [tuʁs ɑ̃ vimø], literally Tours in Vimeu; Picard: Tour-in-Vimeu) is a commune in the Somme department in Hauts-de-France in northern France.

== Geography ==
The commune is situated 8 miles (13 km) southwest of Abbeville, on the D22 road

== Population ==
Historical population
Year	Pop.	±% p.a.
1968	660	—
1975	594	−1.49%
1982	622	+0.66%
1990	736	+2.13%
1999	722	−0.21%
2007	869	+2.34%
2012	872	+0.07%
2017	818	−1.27%
2023	805	−0.27%
Source: INSEE

== See also ==
- Communes of the Somme department
