= Tully, Somme =

Tully
- Commune
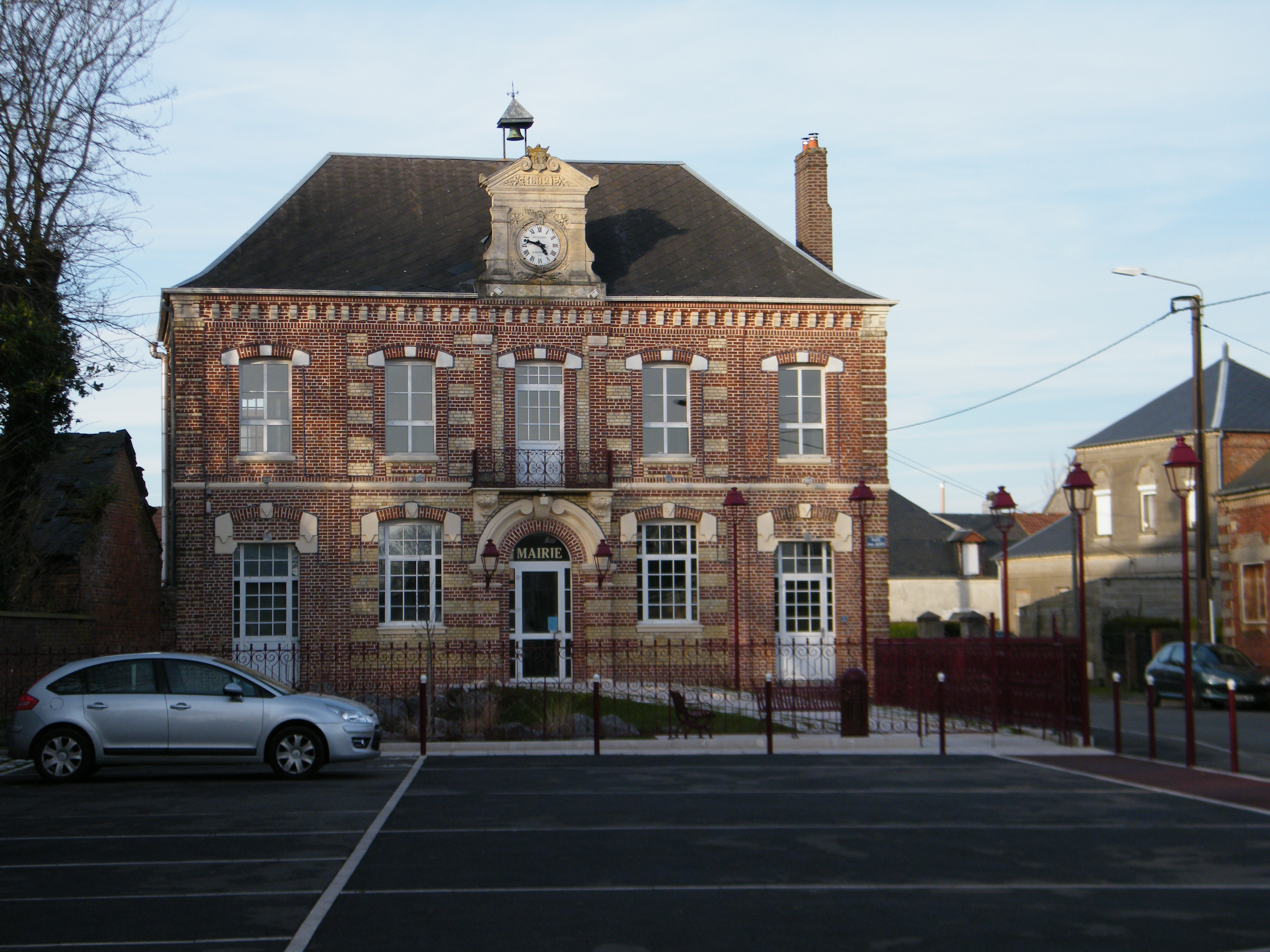
- The town hall in Tully
- Location of Tully
- Location within France Location within Hauts-de-France
- Coordinates: 50°05′08″N 1°31′02″E
- Country: France
- Region: Hauts-de-France
- Department: Somme
- Arrondissement: Abbeville
- Canton: Friville-Escarbotin
- Intercommunality: CC Vimeu

Government
  - Mayor (2020–2026): Béatrice Mullesch
- Area^{1}: 1.88 km^{2} (0.73 sq mi)
- Elevation: 100 m (330 ft)
- Highest elevation: 112 m (367 ft)
- Lowest elevation: 75 m (246 ft)
- Population (2023): 549
  - Density: 292/km^{2} (756/sq mi)
- Time zone: UTC+01:00 (CET)
  - Summer (DST): UTC+02:00 (CEST)
- INSEE/Postal code: 80770 /80130
- ^{1} French Land Register data, which excludes lakes, ponds, glaciers > 1 km^{2} (0.386 sq mi or 247 acres) and river estuaries.

Tully (French pronunciation: [tyli]) is a commune in the Somme department in Hauts-de-France in northern France.

== Geography ==
Tully is situated 15 miles (24 km) southwest of Abbeville, on the D229 road

== Population ==
Historical population
Year	Pop.	±% p.a.
1968	804	—
1975	731	−1.35%
1982	677	−1.09%
1990	699	+0.40%
1999	663	−0.59%
2007	624	−0.75%
2012	594	−0.98%
2017	548	−1.60%
2023	549	+0.03%
Source: INSEE

== See also ==
- Communes of the Somme department
