= Béthencourt-sur-Mer =

- Commune
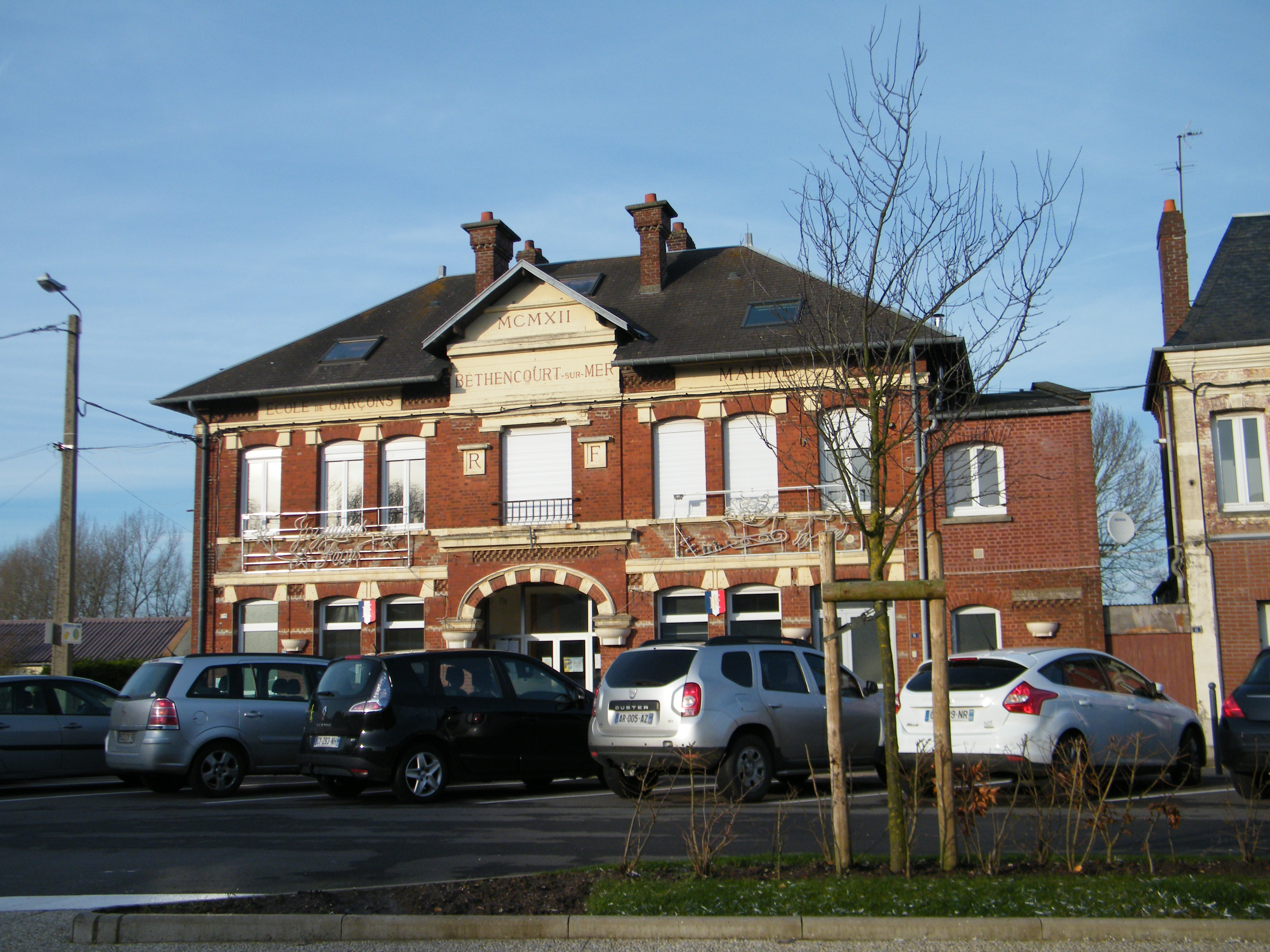
- The town hall and school in Béthencourt-sur-Mer

- Coat of arms
- Location of Béthencourt-sur-Mer
- Location within France Location within Hauts-de-France
- Coordinates: 50°04′43″N 1°30′15″E
- Country: France
- Region: Hauts-de-France
- Department: Somme
- Arrondissement: Abbeville
- Canton: Friville-Escarbotin
- Intercommunality: CC Vimeu

Government
  - Mayor (2020–2026): Denis Durot
- Area^{1}: 2.95 km^{2} (1.14 sq mi)
- Elevation: 97 m (318 ft)
- Highest elevation: 119 m (390 ft)
- Lowest elevation: 75 m (246 ft)
- Population (2023): 882
  - Density: 299/km^{2} (774/sq mi)
- Time zone: UTC+01:00 (CET)
  - Summer (DST): UTC+02:00 (CEST)
- INSEE/Postal code: 80096 /80130
- ^{1} French Land Register data, which excludes lakes, ponds, glaciers > 1 km^{2} (0.386 sq mi or 247 acres) and river estuaries.

Béthencourt-sur-Mer (French pronunciation: [betɑ̃kuʁ syʁ mɛʁ], literally Béthencourt on Sea; Picard: Bétincourt-su-Mér) is a commune in the Somme department in Hauts-de-France in northern France.

== Geography ==
The commune is situated on the D19 and D229 road junction, some 3 miles (5 km) from the seaside and 18 miles (29 km) west of Abbeville.

== Population ==
Historical population
Year	Pop.	±% p.a.
1968	1,120	—
1975	1,163	+0.54%
1982	1,074	−1.13%
1990	1,024	−0.59%
1999	997	−0.30%
2007	1,048	+0.63%
2012	1,033	−0.29%
2017	968	−1.29%
2023	882	−1.54%
Source: INSEE

== See also ==
- Communes of the Somme department
