= Méneslies =

- Commune
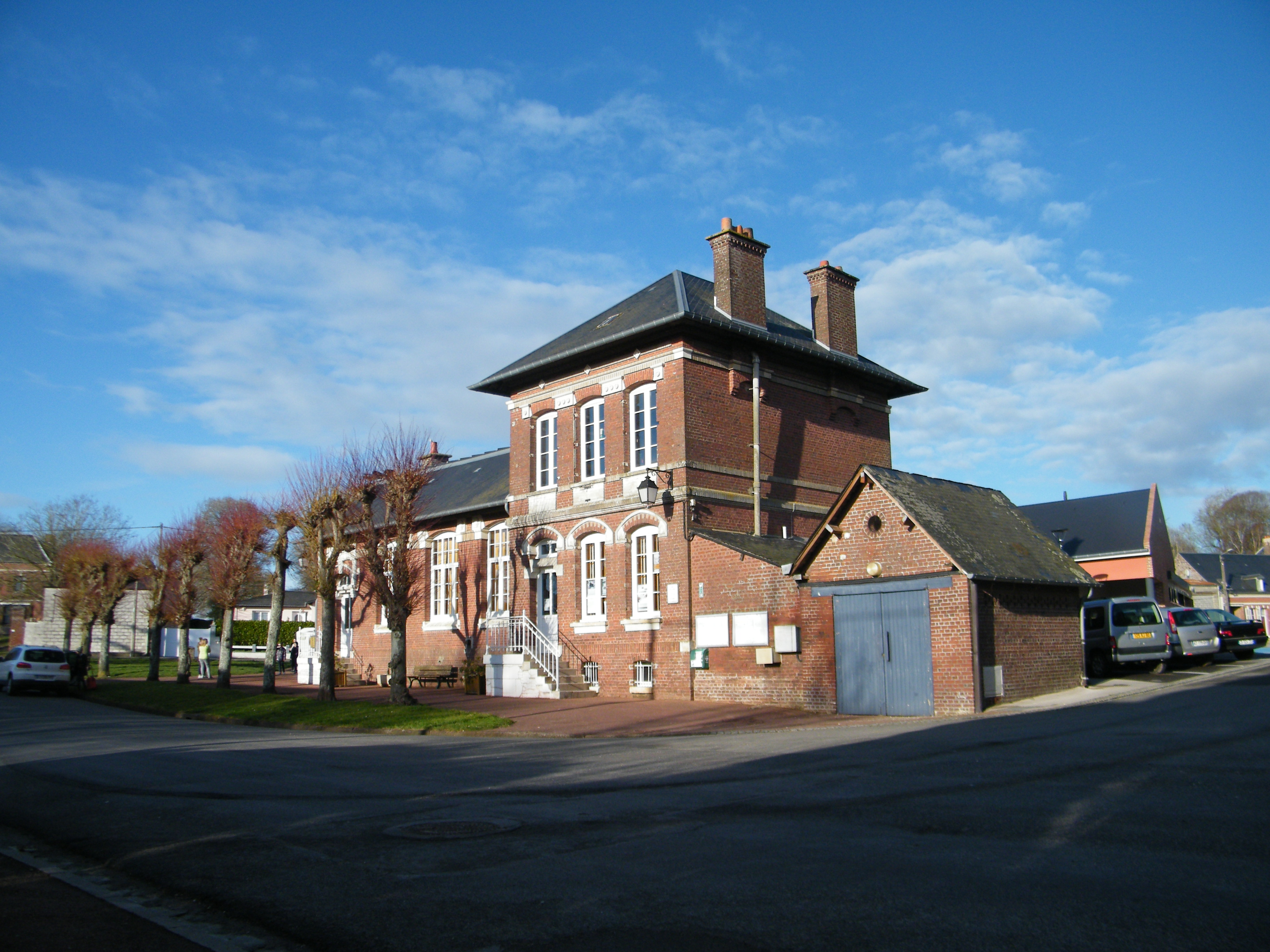
- The town hall and school in Méneslies
- Location of Méneslies
- Location within France Location within Hauts-de-France
- Coordinates: 50°03′32″N 1°29′50″E
- Country: France
- Region: Hauts-de-France
- Department: Somme
- Arrondissement: Abbeville
- Canton: Friville-Escarbotin
- Intercommunality: CC Vimeu

Government
  - Mayor (2020–2026): Michel Dizambourg
- Area^{1}: 4.04 km^{2} (1.56 sq mi)
- Elevation: 90 m (300 ft)
- Highest elevation: 124 m (407 ft)
- Lowest elevation: 55 m (180 ft)
- Population (2023): 298
  - Density: 73.8/km^{2} (191/sq mi)
- Time zone: UTC+01:00 (CET)
  - Summer (DST): UTC+02:00 (CEST)
- INSEE/Postal code: 80527 /80520
- ^{1} French Land Register data, which excludes lakes, ponds, glaciers > 1 km^{2} (0.386 sq mi or 247 acres) and river estuaries.

Méneslies is a commune in the Somme department in Hauts-de-France in northern France.

== Geography ==
The commune is situated on the D19 road, some 15 miles (24 km) southwest of Abbeville.

== Population ==
Historical population
Year	Pop.	±% p.a.
1968	372	—
1975	369	−0.12%
1982	346	−0.92%
1990	327	−0.70%
1999	310	−0.59%
2007	305	−0.20%
2012	306	+0.07%
2017	310	+0.26%
2023	298	−0.66%
Source: INSEE

== See also ==
- Communes of the Somme department
