= Ercourt =

- Commune
- Location of Ercourt
- Location within France Location within Hauts-de-France
- Coordinates: 50°02′36″N 1°43′21″E
- Country: France
- Region: Hauts-de-France
- Department: Somme
- Arrondissement: Abbeville
- Canton: Abbeville-2
- Intercommunality: CC Vimeu

Government
  - Mayor (2020–2026): Jean-Philippe Machu
- Area^{1}: 4.2 km^{2} (1.6 sq mi)
- Elevation: 40 m (130 ft)
- Highest elevation: 113 m (371 ft)
- Lowest elevation: 58 m (190 ft)
- Population (2023): 132
  - Density: 31/km^{2} (81/sq mi)
- Time zone: UTC+01:00 (CET)
  - Summer (DST): UTC+02:00 (CEST)
- INSEE/Postal code: 80280 /80210
- ^{1} French Land Register data, which excludes lakes, ponds, glaciers > 1 km^{2} (0.386 sq mi or 247 acres) and river estuaries.

Ercourt (French pronunciation: [ɛʁkuʁ]; Picard: Ércourt) is a commune in the Somme department in Hauts-de-France in northern France.

== Geography ==
Ercourt is situated on the D86 road, a mile from the A28 autoroute, some 10 miles (16 km) southwest of Abbeville.

== Population ==
Historical population
Year	Pop.	±% p.a.
1968	185	—
1975	178	−0.55%
1982	165	−1.08%
1990	143	−1.77%
1999	124	−1.57%
2007	135	+1.07%
2012	126	−1.37%
2017	122	−0.64%
2023	132	+1.32%
Source: INSEE

== See also ==
- Communes of the Somme department
