= Huchenneville =

- Commune
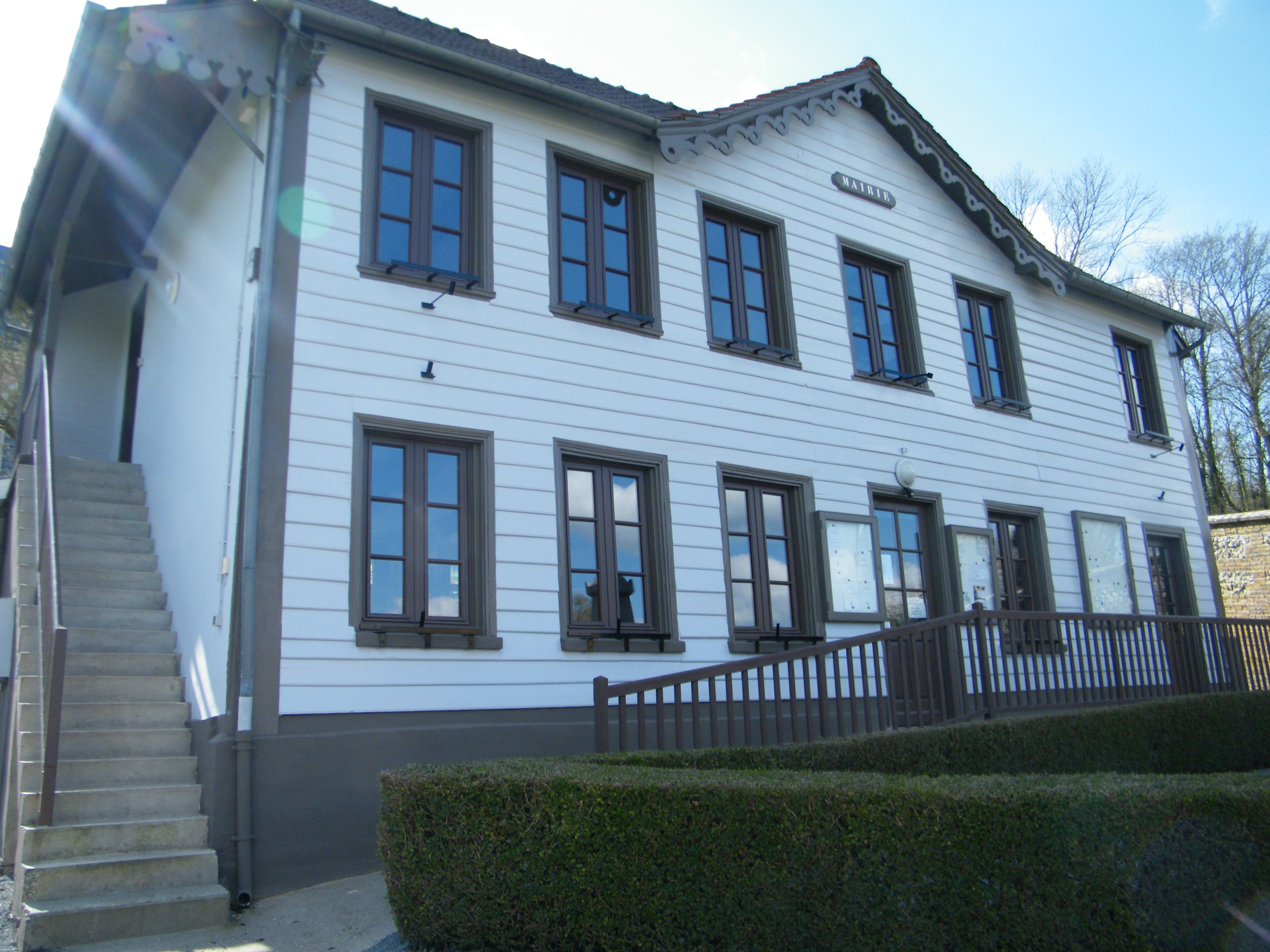
- The town hall in Huchenneville

- Coat of arms
- Location of Huchenneville
- Location within France Location within Hauts-de-France
- Coordinates: 50°03′06″N 1°48′03″E
- Country: France
- Region: Hauts-de-France
- Department: Somme
- Arrondissement: Abbeville
- Canton: Abbeville-2
- Intercommunality: CC Vimeu

Government
  - Mayor (2020–2026): Guy Hazard
- Area^{1}: 11.54 km^{2} (4.46 sq mi)
- Elevation: 102 m (335 ft)
- Highest elevation: 112 m (367 ft)
- Lowest elevation: 14 m (46 ft)
- Population (2023): 679
  - Density: 58.8/km^{2} (152/sq mi)
- Time zone: UTC+01:00 (CET)
  - Summer (DST): UTC+02:00 (CEST)
- INSEE/Postal code: 80444 /80132
- ^{1} French Land Register data, which excludes lakes, ponds, glaciers > 1 km^{2} (0.386 sq mi or 247 acres) and river estuaries.

Huchenneville (French pronunciation: [yʃɛnvil]) is a commune in the Somme department in Hauts-de-France in northern France.

== Geography ==
Huchenneville is situated on the D503a road, some 5 miles (8 km) southwest of Abbeville less than a mile from the junction with the A28 autoroute..

== Population ==
Historical population
| Year | Pop. | ±% p.a. |
|---|---|---|
| 1968 | 592 | — |
| 1975 | 560 | −0.79% |
| 1982 | 581 | +0.53% |
| 1990 | 667 | +1.74% |
| 1999 | 665 | −0.03% |
| 2007 | 657 | −0.15% |
| 2012 | 656 | −0.03% |
| 2017 | 665 | +0.27% |
| 2023 | 679 | +0.35% |
Source: INSEE

== See also ==
- Communes of the Somme department
