= Miannay =

- Commune
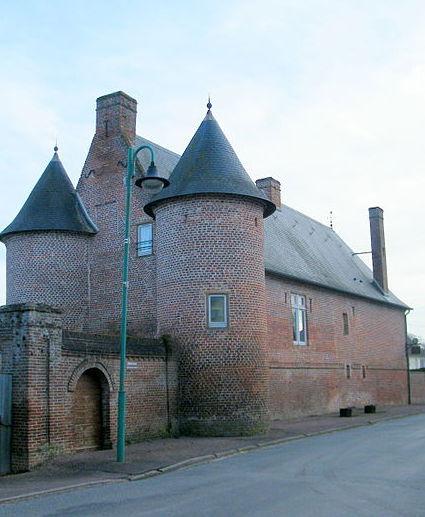
- The chateau in Miannay
- Location of Miannay
- Location within France Location within Hauts-de-France
- Coordinates: 50°05′52″N 1°43′14″E
- Country: France
- Region: Hauts-de-France
- Department: Somme
- Arrondissement: Abbeville
- Canton: Abbeville-2
- Intercommunality: CC Vimeu

Government
  - Mayor (2020–2026): Philippe Delaporte
- Area^{1}: 8.81 km^{2} (3.40 sq mi)
- Elevation: 29 m (95 ft)
- Highest elevation: 82 m (269 ft)
- Lowest elevation: 7 m (23 ft)
- Population (2023): 604
  - Density: 68.6/km^{2} (178/sq mi)
- Time zone: UTC+01:00 (CET)
  - Summer (DST): UTC+02:00 (CEST)
- INSEE/Postal code: 80546 /80132
- ^{1} French Land Register data, which excludes lakes, ponds, glaciers > 1 km^{2} (0.386 sq mi or 247 acres) and river estuaries.

Miannay (French pronunciation: [mjanɛ]) is a commune in the Somme department in Hauts-de-France in northern France.

== Geography ==
Miannay is situated on the D925 road, some 5 miles (8 km) southwest of Abbeville.

== Population ==
Historical population
| Year | Pop. | ±% p.a. |
|---|---|---|
| 1968 | 544 | — |
| 1975 | 505 | −1.06% |
| 1982 | 579 | +1.97% |
| 1990 | 558 | −0.46% |
| 1999 | 553 | −0.10% |
| 2007 | 599 | +1.00% |
| 2012 | 551 | −1.66% |
| 2017 | 564 | +0.47% |
| 2023 | 604 | +1.15% |
Source: INSEE

== See also ==
- Communes of the Somme department
