= Mareuil-Caubert =

- Commune
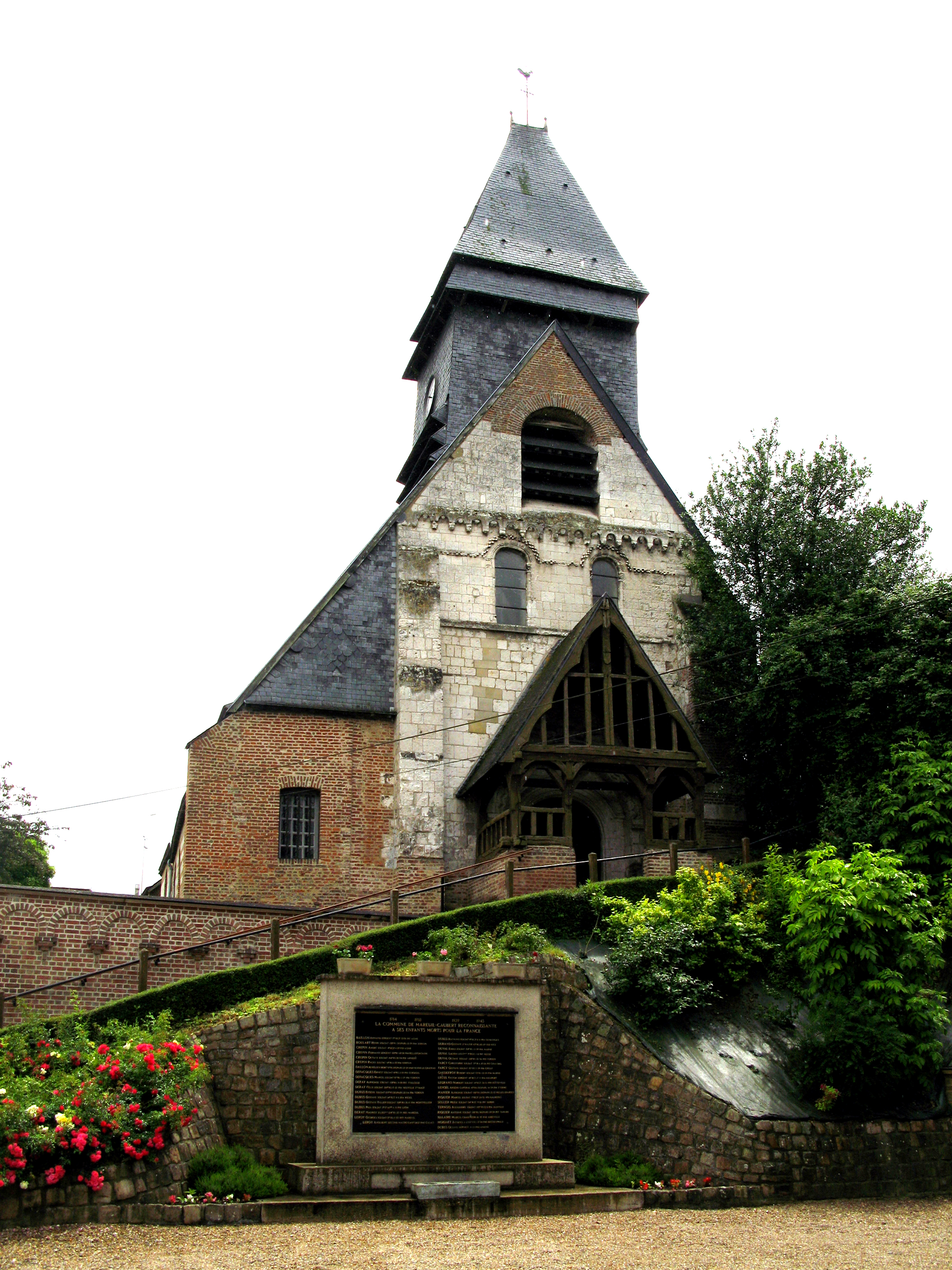
- The church in Mareuil-Caubert

- Coat of arms
- Location of Mareuil-Caubert
- Location within France Location within Hauts-de-France
- Coordinates: 50°04′14″N 1°49′47″E
- Country: France
- Region: Hauts-de-France
- Department: Somme
- Arrondissement: Abbeville
- Canton: Abbeville-2
- Intercommunality: CA Baie de Somme

Government
  - Mayor (2020–2026): Jean-Michel Menourie
- Area^{1}: 9.08 km^{2} (3.51 sq mi)
- Elevation: 12 m (39 ft)
- Highest elevation: 87 m (285 ft)
- Lowest elevation: 3 m (9.8 ft)
- Population (2023): 840
  - Density: 93/km^{2} (240/sq mi)
- Time zone: UTC+01:00 (CET)
  - Summer (DST): UTC+02:00 (CEST)
- INSEE/Postal code: 80512 /80132
- ^{1} French Land Register data, which excludes lakes, ponds, glaciers > 1 km^{2} (0.386 sq mi or 247 acres) and river estuaries.

Mareuil-Caubert (French pronunciation: [maʁœj kobɛʁ]; Picard: Mareu-Cœubert) is a commune in the Somme department in Hauts-de-France in northern France.

== Geography ==
The commune is situated on the D3 road, some 5 kilometres (3 mi) south of Abbeville, on the left bank of the river Somme.

== Population ==
Historical population
Year	Pop.	±% p.a.
1968	862	—
1975	922	+0.97%
1982	923	+0.02%
1990	900	−0.31%
1999	890	−0.12%
2007	913	+0.32%
2012	878	−0.78%
2017	825	−1.24%
2023	840	+0.30%
Source: INSEE

== Places of interest ==
The 12th-16th century church of Saint-Christophe, classed as a « monument historique ».
Built in the Romanesque style in the 12th and 16th century, the church was originally part of a priory under the abbey of Breteuil.

== See also ==
- Communes of the Somme department
