= Vimeu =

Region of France between Bresle and the Somme

The Vimeu (French pronunciation: [vimø]) is a natural region of France, located west of Picardy and bounded by two valleys, that of Bresle in the south and that of the Somme in the north.
