= Tœufles =

- Commune
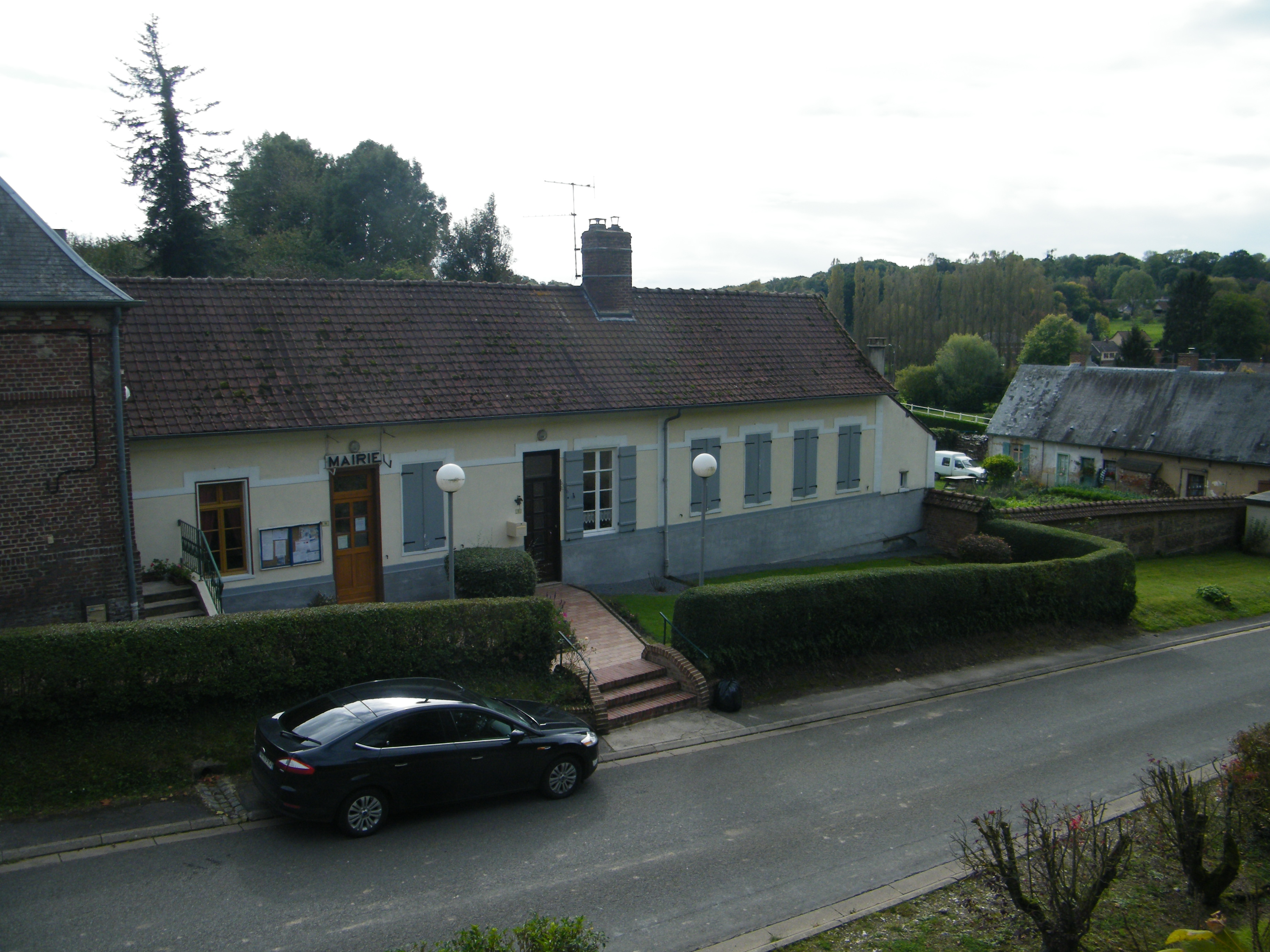
- The town hall in Tœufles

- Coat of arms
- Location of Tœufles
- Location within France Location within Hauts-de-France
- Coordinates: 50°04′01″N 1°42′55″E
- Country: France
- Region: Hauts-de-France
- Department: Somme
- Arrondissement: Abbeville
- Canton: Abbeville-2
- Intercommunality: CC Vimeu

Government
  - Mayor (2020–2026): Christian Magnier
- Area^{1}: 8.88 km^{2} (3.43 sq mi)
- Elevation: 106 m (348 ft)
- Highest elevation: 114 m (374 ft)
- Lowest elevation: 30 m (98 ft)
- Population (2023): 308
  - Density: 34.7/km^{2} (89.8/sq mi)
- Time zone: UTC+01:00 (CET)
  - Summer (DST): UTC+02:00 (CEST)
- INSEE/Postal code: 80764 /80870
- ^{1} French Land Register data, which excludes lakes, ponds, glaciers > 1 km^{2} (0.386 sq mi or 247 acres) and river estuaries.

Tœufles (French pronunciation: [tœfl]) is a commune in the Somme department in Hauts-de-France in northern France.

== Geography ==
The commune is situated 6 miles (10 km) southwest of Abbeville, on the D22 road, by the banks of the river Trie.

== Population ==
Historical population
Year	Pop.	±% p.a.
1968	367	—
1975	329	−1.55%
1982	305	−1.08%
1990	300	−0.21%
1999	313	+0.47%
2007	284	−1.21%
2012	290	+0.42%
2017	299	+0.61%
2023	308	+0.50%
Source: INSEE

== Places of interest ==
- The church
- Château of Rogeant,
- Château of Tœufles,

== See also ==
- Communes of the Somme department
