= Béhen =

- Commune
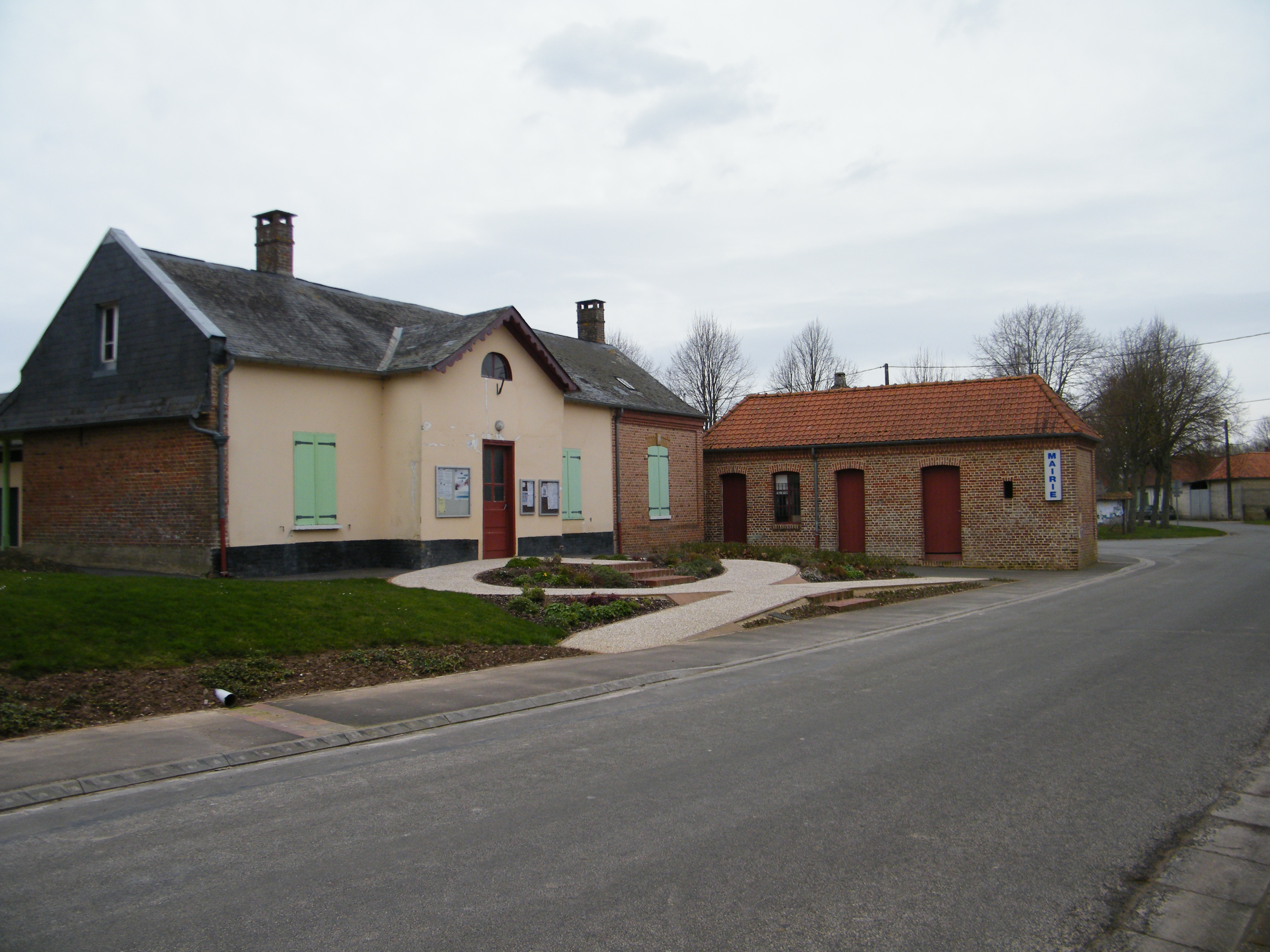
- The town hall in Béhen

- Coat of arms
- Location of Béhen
- Location within France Location within Hauts-de-France
- Coordinates: 50°03′22″N 1°45′21″E
- Country: France
- Region: Hauts-de-France
- Department: Somme
- Arrondissement: Abbeville
- Canton: Abbeville-2
- Intercommunality: CC Vimeu

Government
  - Mayor (2020–2026): Jean-Claude Parmentier
- Area^{1}: 9.83 km^{2} (3.80 sq mi)
- Elevation: 106 m (348 ft)
- Highest elevation: 114 m (374 ft)
- Lowest elevation: 64 m (210 ft)
- Population (2023): 500
  - Density: 51/km^{2} (130/sq mi)
- Time zone: UTC+01:00 (CET)
  - Summer (DST): UTC+02:00 (CEST)
- INSEE/Postal code: 80076 /80870
- ^{1} French Land Register data, which excludes lakes, ponds, glaciers > 1 km^{2} (0.386 sq mi or 247 acres) and river estuaries.

Béhen is a commune in the Somme department in Hauts-de-France in northern France.

== Geography ==
Béhen is situated on the D173 road, 7 miles (11 km) southwest of Abbeville.

== Population ==
Historical population
Year	Pop.	±% p.a.
1968	436	—
1975	416	−0.67%
1982	446	+1.00%
1990	413	−0.96%
1999	439	+0.68%
2007	435	−0.11%
2012	476	+1.82%
2017	509	+1.35%
2023	500	−0.30%
Source: INSEE

== See also ==
- Communes of the Somme department
