= Cambron =

- Commune
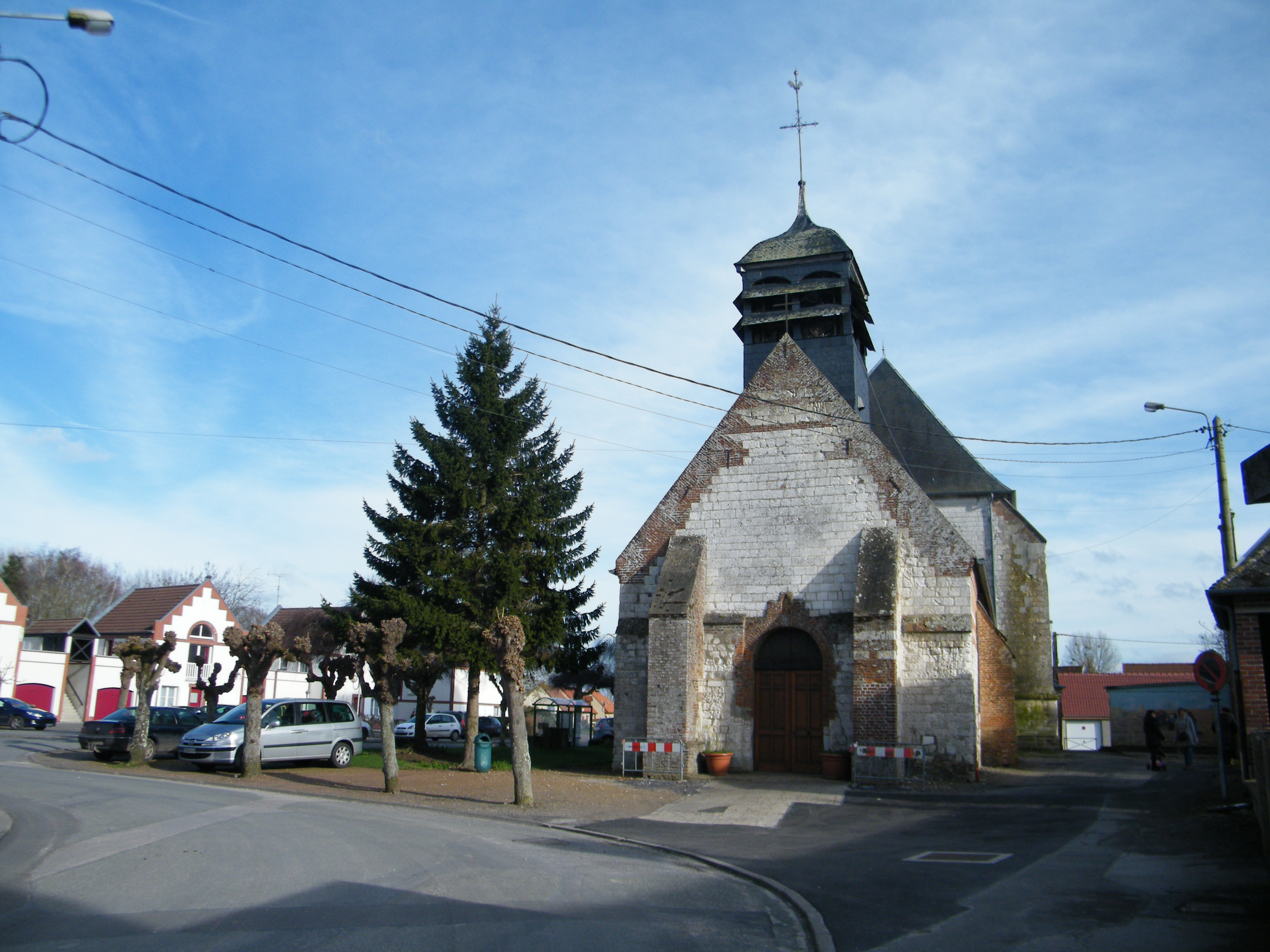
- The church in Cambron

- Coat of arms
- Location of Cambron
- Location within France Location within Hauts-de-France
- Coordinates: 50°06′42″N 1°46′15″E
- Country: France
- Region: Hauts-de-France
- Department: Somme
- Arrondissement: Abbeville
- Canton: Abbeville-2
- Intercommunality: CA Baie de Somme

Government
  - Mayor (2020–2026): Claude Leblond
- Area^{1}: 12.61 km^{2} (4.87 sq mi)
- Elevation: 12 m (39 ft)
- Highest elevation: 76 m (249 ft)
- Lowest elevation: 3 m (9.8 ft)
- Population (2023): 740
  - Density: 59/km^{2} (150/sq mi)
- Time zone: UTC+01:00 (CET)
  - Summer (DST): UTC+02:00 (CEST)
- INSEE/Postal code: 80163 /80132
- ^{1} French Land Register data, which excludes lakes, ponds, glaciers > 1 km^{2} (0.386 sq mi or 247 acres) and river estuaries.

Cambron (French pronunciation: [kɑ̃bʁɔ̃]) is a commune in the Somme department in Hauts-de-France in northern France.

== Geography ==
Cambron is situated on the D3 road, some 3 miles (5 km) west of Abbeville.

== Population ==
Historical population
Year	Pop.	±% p.a.
1968	659	—
1975	616	−0.96%
1982	653	+0.84%
1990	630	−0.45%
1999	710	+1.34%
2007	718	+0.14%
2012	745	+0.74%
2017	724	−0.57%
2023	740	+0.36%
Source: INSEE

== See also ==
- Communes of the Somme department
