= Canton of Saint-Valery-sur-Somme =

Coordinates: 50°11′20″N 1°37′50″E

Saint-Valery-sur-Somme
- Former canton
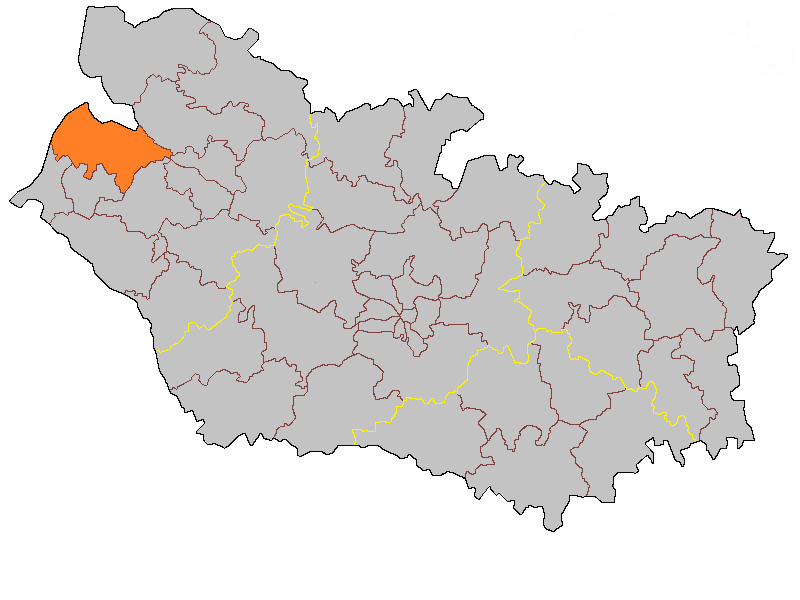
- Country: France
- Region: Hauts-de-France
- Department: Somme
- No. of communes: {{{nbcomm}}}
- Disbanded: 2015
- Area: 146.31 km^{2} (56.49 sq mi)
- Population (2012): 11,583
  - Density: 79.168/km^{2} (205.04/sq mi)

The Canton of Saint-Valery-sur-Somme is a former canton situated in the Somme department of northern France. It was disbanded following the French canton reorganisation which came into effect in March 2015. It had 11,583 inhabitants (2012).

== Geography ==
The canton is organised around Saint-Valery-sur-Somme in the arrondissement of Abbeville. The altitude varies from 0 m (Boismont) to 90 m (Franleu) for an average altitude of 24 m.

The canton comprised 12 communes:

- Arrest
- Boismont
- Brutelles
- Cayeux-sur-Mer
- Estrébœuf
- Franleu
- Lanchères
- Mons-Boubert
- Pendé
- Saigneville
- Saint-Blimont
- Saint-Valery-sur-Somme

== Population ==
Population Growth
| 1962 | 1968 | 1975 | 1982 | 1990 | 1999 |
|---|---|---|---|---|---|
| 11780 | 12070 | 11961 | 11664 | 11762 | 11345 |
Census count starting from 1962 : Population without double counting

== See also ==
- Arrondissements of the Somme department
- Cantons of the Somme department
- Communes of the Somme department
