= Haulotte Group =

French aerial work platform manufacturer

- Type: Public
- Traded as: Euronext: PIG; CAC Small
- ISIN: FR0000066755
- Industry: Construction
- Founded: 1924 (Haulotte); 1995 (Pinguely-Haulotte)
- Founder: Alexandre Pinguely
- Headquarters: L'Horme, France
- Key people: Pierre Saubot
- Revenue: EUR759.4 million (2023)
- Number of employees: 1970 (2007)
- Parent: Solem SAS
- Subsidiaries: ABM Industries SA, HAULOTTE Australia Pty Ltd, HAULOTTE GmbH, HAULOTTE Iberica SL, HAULOTTE Italia Srl, HAULOTTE Netherlands BV, HAULOTTE Portugal, HAULOTTE Scandinavia AB, HAULOTTE UK Ltd, HAULOTTE US Inc.
- Website: www.haulotte.com

Haulotte Group is a major French aerial work platform manufacturer, the third-largest company in the world in this area of products.

== History ==
Haulotte Group was formed from the merger of Pinguely and Haulotte in 1995, and renamed Haulotte Group in 2005.

== Pinguely ==
Pinguely was formed by Alexandre Pinguely in Lyon, France, in 1881. At first they made steam locomotives, but diversified into making equipment. In 1892, they supplied a locomotive to the Chemin de Fer de St Victor à Thizy. In 1895, Pinguely supplied seven locomotives to the Voiron - Saint-Béron railway. Pinguely was not a major locomotive manufacturer in terms of numbers produced. In 1930, Pinguely supplied a steam tram locomotive to the Chemin de Fer du Haut-Rhône. By 1932, Pinguely was also making steam shovels. Production of steam locomotives was stopped, and the company concentrated on manufacturing earthmoving equipment and mobile cranes.

== Haulotte ==
Haulotte was formed in 1924 in L'Horme by Arthur Haulotte, the company being Ateliers de Construction A. Haulotte. They specialised in the production of aerial platforms, derricks and mobile cranes.

== Creusot-Loire ==
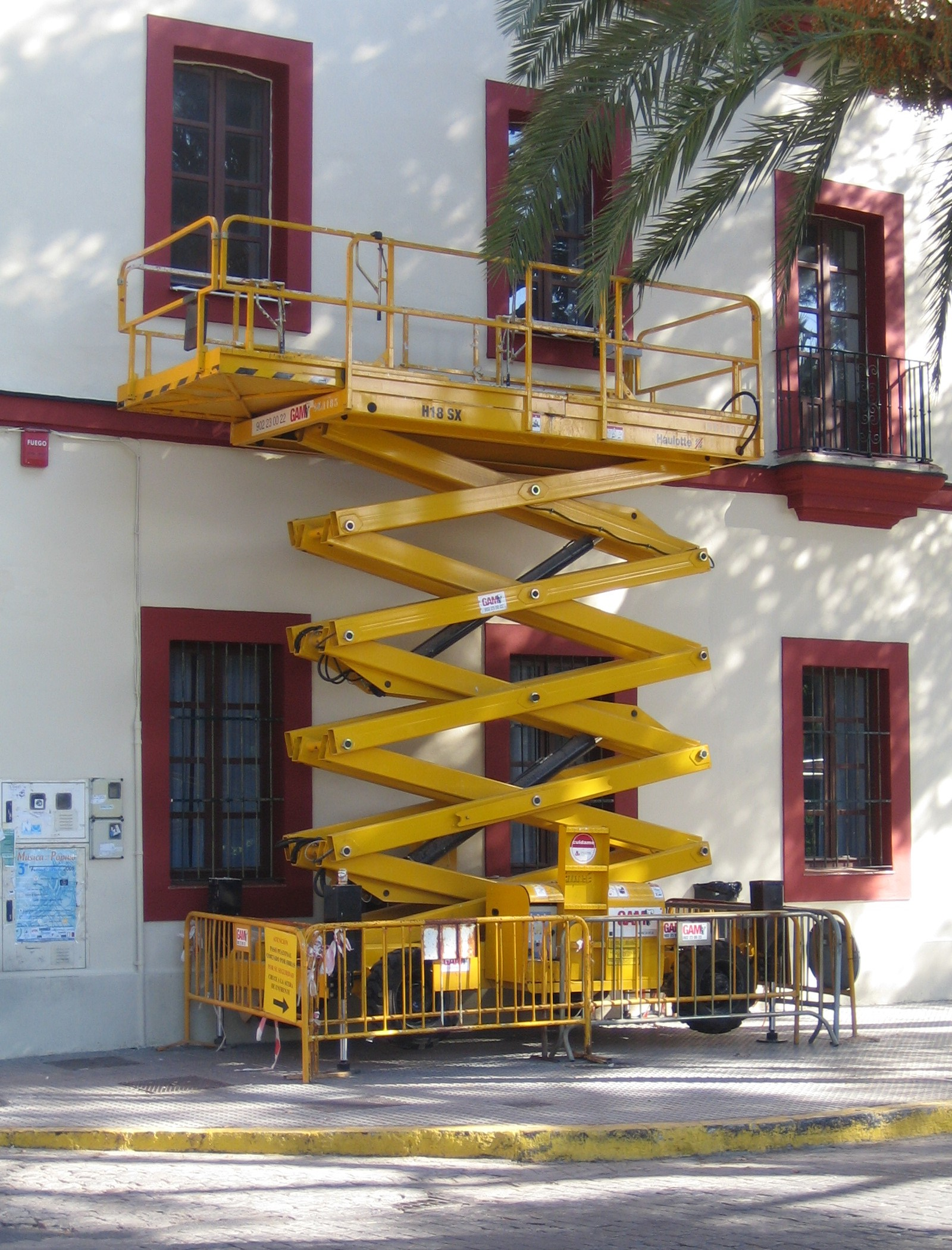
Haulotte Scissor Lift

Pinguely and Haulotte were both taken over by the steel conglomerate Creusot-Loire. Creusot-Loire went bankrupt in 1984, and the future of Pinguely and Haulotte was in doubt. In 1985, both companies were bought by Pierre Saubot. Saubot had spotted a new market for aerial work platforms, and that work was assigned to Haulotte. Pinguely manufactured tower cranes in the meantime, mainly to fulfill a contract with the French Army. By the mid-90s, Haulotte was the leading manufacturer of aerial work platforms in France. The companies were kept separate through the 80s, and in 1995 became Pinguely-Haulotte. It was decided to concentrate on the aerial platform business, although Pinguely had won a contract worth FF300 million to supply equipment to the French Army.

== Pinguely-Haulotte ==
Saubot decided to abandon all products and concentrate on self-propelled aerial work platforms, with the actual manufacturing sub-contracted out. Pinguely-Haulotte doing the design, research, development, engineering and marketing. In 1997, the last of the equipment for the French Army was delivered. The company was struggling to keep up with demand by this time, and subsidiary companies were set up in Germany and the United Kingdom. In 1998, Pinguely-Haulotte went public, sales having risen from EUR25 million in 1995 to EUR56 million in 1998. By 1999, Pinguely-Haulotte were producing 3,000 units a year, and in 2000 a new plant in Reims was acquired, raising production to 6,000 units. During this time, Pinguely-Haulotte were expanding their manufacturing base to include Australia, the Netherlands, Portugal and Spain. In 2000, Pinguely-Haulotte were in negotiations to acquire the European operations of Terex in the United States. This would have brought factories in Ireland and the Netherlands into Pinguely-Haulotte's ownership, but the deal fell through the following year. By the end of 2001 production was up to 10,000 units a year and sale were EUR246 million. Pinguely-Haulotte expanded into Brazil, Singapore, Sweden and the US in that year. by mid-2002, Pinguely-Haulotte were the world's third biggest manufacturer of aerial work platforms, with a global share of 17%.

Pinguely-Haulotte was renamed Haulotte Group in 2005, thus bringing the end of the Pinguely name after 124 years. Their main business is the manufacture of articulated work platforms, scissor lifts, telescopic work platforms, trailer mounted work platforms and vertical mast-work platforms

On July 24, 2008 Haulotte Group acquired Bil-Jax, Inc., the largest U.S. scaffold manufacturer. These days, Haulotte Group has 3 plants in France, 1 in Spain, 2 in the USA (former Bill-Jax) and 1 in Romania, near the city of Pitești. A brand-new plant is in the process of being opened (November–December '08), 1 km away from the existing plant near Pitești, in Argeș County. The name will be Argeș II. The General Manager of the new plant will be the same as the one in the existing plant, Mr. Philippe Gault.

== Preserved Pinguely locomotives ==
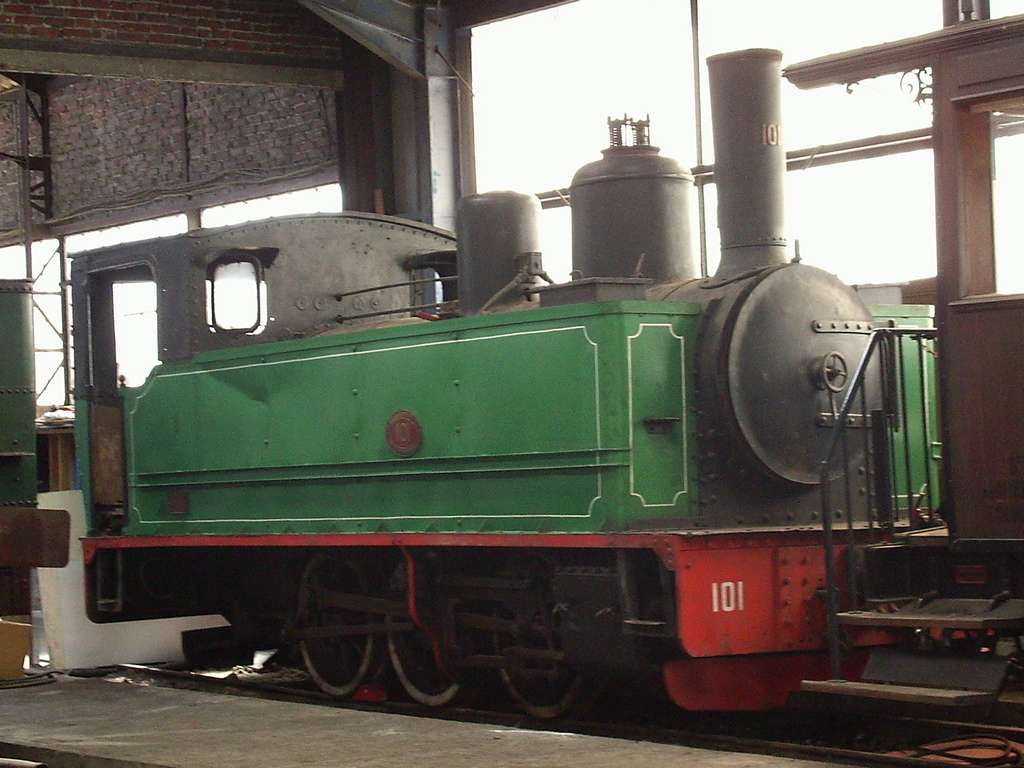
165/1904 - Chemins de Fer du Morbihan No.101

Works number/Year	Identity	Location
39/1897	Chemin de fer du Drôme #16	Musée des Tramways à Vapeur et des Chemins de Fer Secondaires France, Butry-sur-Oise
143/1902	Chemins de fer du Morbihan #14	Transrail Headquarters in Korofina, Mali
165/1904	Chemins de fer du Morbihan #101	Chemin de Fer de la Baie de Somme
167/1904	Chemins de fer du Morbihan #103	Tournon, France
240/1909	Tramways de l'Ouest du Dauphiné #31	Chemin de Fer du Vivarais, Tournon
368/1922	Tuileries de La Rochefoucauld	Musée Maurice Dufresne, Azay-Le-Rideau, France
	Chemins de fer du Beaujolais #8	l'Association des Amis du Petit Anjou, Angers, France
