= Chemin de fer de la Baie de Somme =

Heritage railway in France

Chemin de Fer de la Baie de Somme

Somme Bay Railway
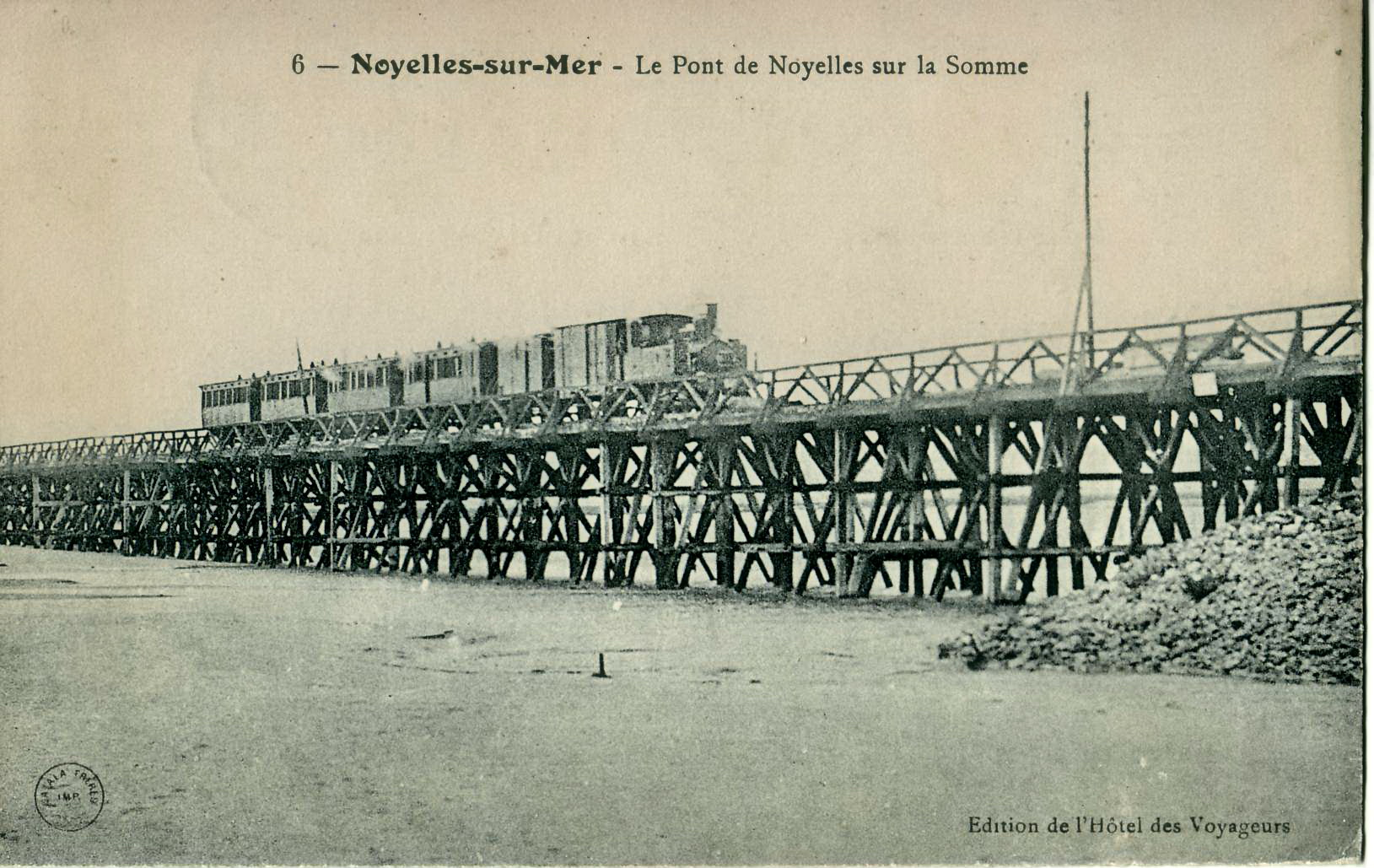
- A train on the estacade c.1910

- Map of the network

Commercial operations
- Built by: CF du Nord
- Original gauge: 1,435 mm (4 ft 8 1/2 in) standard gauge 1,000 mm (3 ft 3 3/8 in) metre gauge

Preserved operations
- Owned by: Association du Chemin de Fer de la Baie de Somme
- Operated by: Association du Chemin de Fer de la Baie de Somme
- Preserved gauge: 1,435 mm (4 ft 8 1/2 in) standard gauge 1,000 mm (3 ft 3 3/8 in) metre gauge

Commercial history
- Opened: 5 June 1858

The Chemin de Fer de la Baie de Somme (French pronunciation: [ʃəmɛ̃ də fɛʁ də la bɛ də sɔm], lit. 'Somme Bay Railway'), is a preserved railway in northern France. The railway is managed by a non-profit organization, which runs from March to December between the towns of the Baie de Somme area: Le Crotoy and Cayeux-sur-Mer via Noyelles-sur-Mer and Saint-Valery-sur-Somme, on metre gauge tracks (formerly part of Société générale des chemins de fer économiques). The association was founded in 1970 and over the years it has become a major player in tourism development in the Picardy coast and is also responsible for the preservation, safeguarding and enhancement of the fleet full of cars, wagons, steam locomotives and diesel locomotives. A part of the line has dual gauge track, and although forming part of a group of five lines, at least a part of it has always been open to traffic.

== Origins and route ==
Arrangement of rails

=== The standard gauge line to Saint-Valery ===
A branch to Saint-Valery had been proposed as early as 1845. In 1853 the Chemin de Fer du Nord was granted permission to build a single track branch from Noyelles to Saint-Valery. This 5.6 kilometres (3.5 mi) long line crossed the River Dien by means of a 1,367 metres (1,495 yd) long wooden trestle bridge. The original passenger station at Saint-Valery stood at the site later occupied by Saint-Valery Canal station. The line opened to traffic on 5 June 1858. It was 1885 before the CF du Nord was able to get permission to use steam locomotives at Saint-Valery's docks, horse power having to be used before them.

=== The metre gauge lines ===
In the 1880s, there were various schemes to build narrow gauge lines of either 750 mm (2 ft 5 1/2 in) or 1,000 mm (3 ft 3 3/8 in) metre gauge in the Somme département. Eventually, a metre gauge line nearly 7.5 kilometres (4.7 mi) long was built by the Société générale des chemins de fer économiques (SE) from Noyelles to Le Crotoy, opening on 1 July 1887. A second metre gauge line opened on 6 September 1887 from Noyelles to Cayeux, 18 kilometres (11 mi) from Noyelles, with stations at Saint-Valery Ville and Lanchères-Pendé. The line between Noyelles and Saint-Valery being laid between the rails of the standard gauge branch, which was also extended into Saint-Valery Ville. The line between Noyelles and Saint-Valery kept its Intérêt Général status, and the other lines had Intérêt Local status, with separate tickets being issued for each part of the route.

The railway carried holiday-makers to seaside resorts, and transporting local freight of galets, sugar beet, chicory and shellfish. Running around the entire length of the Somme Bay in the Somme département, in Picardy, northern France, it connected Le Crotoy with Noyelles-sur-Mer, Saint-Valery-sur-Somme and Cayeux-sur-Mer, including the sands at Brighton-Plage. Other minor stations or halts were provided near assorted villages, hamlets and farms. In its literature, the operating Association claims that past passengers have included Colette, Jules Verne, Anatole France, and Toulouse-Lautrec.

=== The Réseau des Bains de Mer ===
These lines, with two others were grouped together as the Réseau des Bains de Mer. The other two lines were one from Noyelles to Forest-l'Abbaye and one from Abbeville to Dompierre-sur-Authie, which had a junction with the line from Noyelles at Forest-l'Abbaye. The Réseau des Bains de Mer was a part of the Chemins de fer départementaux de la Somme.

== Wars ==
The CFBS line was affected by three wars; The Franco-Prussian War, the First World War and the Second World War.

=== Franco-Prussian War ===
France declared war on Prussia on 19 July 1870. Saint-Valery was a strategic port, and thus its capture was an objective of the Prussians. In October 1870 the French requisitioned Jules Verne's boat Saint-Michel I for the defence of the Baie de Somme. The boat was crewed by Crimean War veterans. In December 1870 horses and equipment were requisitioned for use by the French cavalry. A consignment of six hundred saddles left Saint-Valery by train for Noyelles on the 30 December. The Prussians occupied Saint-Valery from February 1871 until September 1873.

=== First World War ===
The CFBS line was particularly involved towards the end of the First World War, starting with Operation Michael on 21 March 1918. It was realised that the German advance threatened the Allies' ability to use railways in the area, and that there was a lack of line capacity in certain places. Therefore, a double track 1,435 mm (4 ft 8 1/2 in) standard gauge line was constructed, linking the main line from Calais with the Abancourt-St. Omer line. The engineer, Raoul Dautry, claimed he could build the line in 100 days. Work began on 15 May 1918 and the line opened to traffic on 15 August 1918, just 106 days later. Thus, the line was known as "La Ligne de Cent Jours" or The Line of One Hundred Days. The line was last used on 1 January 1919 and the track lifted in March and April of that year, thus ending the short life of the line.

=== Second World War ===
==== Baie de Somme area ====
On 21 May 1940, German troops invaded the Baie de Somme area. Noyelles was the scene of Allied air strikes on various occasions. In September and October 1942, coastal defences were constructed in the Baie de Somme area. In February 1944, the Germans flooded the low-lying land near Noyelles by blocking the River Dien where the railway to Saint-Valery crossed it by a long embankment (this embankment had replaced a trestle in 1912). In April and May 1944, preparations were made to prevent the Allies from using the area to invade France.

==== CFBS line ====
On 24 October 1941, a train was attacked at Noyelles and the locomotive was destroyed. In November 1941, one of the metre-gauge trains was attacked between Noyelles and Saint-Valery, with several railway workers wounded. Cayeux saw much increased traffic in galets, temporary 600 mm (1 ft 11 5/8 in)-gauge lines being laid on the beach and down the streets of the village. A metre-gauge line was laid along the road from Lanchères to Ault, on the standard gauge line from Woincourt to Onival, with a branch (or separate 600 mm / 1 ft 11 5/8 in gauge) line at Hautebut to a quarry near the coast. The Germans brought in a number of locomotives to work these lines, and after the war, nine of them were dumped just outside Saint-Valery, where three still remain (a fourth having been removed for restoration in 1997 - see below).

On 2 December 1942 the water tower at Saint-Valery was destroyed. On 4 May 1944, the depot at Saint-Valery along with two rail cars and a locomotive, were destroyed by fire. In June, the Saint-Valery area was bombed as a diversion from the D-Day landings. On 19 August, the Resistance blew up the water tower at Noyelles, followed by an ammunition train on 1 September. English and Polish troops relieved Saint-Valery on 2 September, and proceeded to bombard the Germans across the bay at Le Crotoy.

== Freight ==
The main types of freight carried by the railway were:

=== Chicory ===
A chicory processing works was built at Saint-Valery Canal. A siding was laid in 1929 to serve it. The derelict building was demolished in 1998.

=== Sugar beet ===
The main sugar beet season was from October to January, thus providing useful income out of the tourist season. A râperie (shredding plant) was built at Lanchères. The râperie extracted the raw juice from the beet, and then sent it by pipeline to the sugar factory of Beauchamps. It had its own railway system and locomotives, which also worked on the CFBS line to Noyelles.

=== Galets ===
Before the railway came, the port of Saint-Valery handled galets (flint or silica pebbles) brought on rafts from Cayeux. The galets were used in the building and ceramics industries.

=== Shellfish ===
Local shellfish taken from the Baie de Somme were sent to market at Abbeville. Shellfish not available locally were also brought in to Le Crotoy for use in a restaurant there.

=== Other goods ===
Saint-Valery handled timber, jute, textiles, soap, phosphates and coal. Phosphates were mined at Crécy-en-Ponthieu and transported via a metre gauge line from there to Noyelles, and thence to Saint-Valery. Freight between Noyelles and Saint-Valery was sometimes carried in standard gauge wagons, but hauled by the metre gauge locomotives. This practice continued until 1973.

== Demise and re-birth ==
After the Second World War, a plan was put forward to extend the standard gauge to Le Crotoy and Cayeux, with a new line to Le Hourdel at a cost of some FRF150-200 million. In 1963 another proposal was made to extend the dual gauge track to Lanchères at a cost of some FRF93 million. Even as late as 1968 plans were being proposed to extend the standard gauge to Cayeux, this time with the closure of the branch to Le Crotoy.

The line from Saint-Valery Ville to Cayeux was relaid with 25 kg/m (50.4 lb/yd) rails recovered from the standard gauge Woincourt-Orival line, which closed to passengers in May 1939 and completely from 1 January 1947. In 1949 the CFBS acquired some second hand steam locomotives after the closure of the Réseau Albert. Three second-hand railcars were acquired in 1955 and a new railcar was acquired in 1957, along with two second hand diesel locomotives. A third diesel locomotive was acquired in 1960. In 1971 a pair of De Dion-Bouton type OC1 bogie railcars (X157 and X158) were acquired from the Réseau Breton (RB), having been previously used on the Chemin de Fer des Côtes-du-Nord (CdN). X158 was subsequently transferred to the Chemins de fer de la Corse, and is now preserved by the CdN Society at Langueux. A trailing railcar was also acquired from the RB in 1971, having previously been built as a powered railcar.

The CFBS steam locomotives were mainly confined to the sugar beet trains after the war. The very last CFBS steam train running on 5 April 1959. The steam locomotive from the râperie at Lanchères worked until 1965. The râperie itself closed in 1966, at the end of the '65-66 season.

Even as late as 1958, the CFBS lines were carrying some 50,000–55,000 tonnes (49,000–54,000 long tons; 55,000–61,000 short tons) of freight, including 35,000–40,000 tonnes (34,000–39,000 long tons; 39,000–44,000 short tons) of sugar beet and 10,000 tonnes (9,800 long tons; 11,000 short tons) of galets. In that year, a railcar caught fire at Cayeux, and the fire destroyed the loco shed, which was rebuilt. In 1961, the SE merged with the Compagnie Générale de Chemins de Fer et de Transports Automobiles (CFTA). The CFTA had interests in road transport, and instigated a system of rationalisation and cuts. The company livery changed from green to red and cream. Both goods and passenger traffic declined during the middle '60s and the line from Noyelles to Le Crotoy closed with effect from 31 December 1969. CFTA worked the line to Cayeux for three more years, galets being carried by rail as late as 1970. The line from Saint-Valery to Cayeux closed with effect from 31 December 1972. The SNCF continued to use the standard gauge line between Noyelles and Saint-Valery for occasional freight trains. The SNCF line between Noyelles and Saint-Valery was last used on 6 February 1989 and closed with effect from 1 January 1993.

Local opposition to the closure of the line to Le Crotoy was strong, and a preservation group was formed on 13 November 1969, initially under the name of Association Ferroviaire Picardie, and from 14 March 1970 the Chemin de Fer de la Baie de Somme (CFBS). The initial aim of the society was to preserve the line from Noyelles to Le Crotoy as a tourist line. The first tourist trains ran on 4 July 1971, but although the railway had permission from SNCF to run into Noyelles, they were not allowed to drop or collect passengers there under an agreement with the local bus company. This arrangement lasting until 1986.

With the announcement that the Cayeux line was to close, the CFBS set up a new company, the Compagnie des Chemins de Fer Touristiques et Industriels de Picardie (CFTIP), which was founded 17 April 1973. From 1973 to 1981 it was the CFTIP rather than the CFBS which was responsible for running the trains. The CFTIP was unsuccessful in its bid to take over the freight traffic from Noyelles to Saint-Valery from SNCF. In 1976, there was a split within the CFBS/CFTIP, a splinter group, the Chemin de Fer Touristique de la Côte d'Opale (CFTO) running trains between Saint-Valery Ville and Cayeux. The CFTO folded in December 1977 and the Cayeux line reverted to the CFTIP. By the late 1970s, the growth in the numbers of passengers meant that more coaches were needed, but those inherited from the SE/CFTA were in poor condition. Nine coaches were acquired from Switzerland between 1978 and 1984.

The CFBS again suffered a drop in passengers in the early '80s, but in 1982 the CFTIP was wound up, and the CFBS confirmed as its successor in an agreement with SNCF and the Somme Département. At the end of the operation of the public service by the CFTA, an association of volunteers passionate about railways, the nonprofit Association of Railway Bay of Somme (SFBC), established on 13 March 1970 decided to operate as a tourist railway line Sea Baths group linking Noyelles-sur-Mer in Crotoy, closed since 31 December 1969. The operation of the line is then only during the summer. Winter is conducive to maintenance of the line and equipment.

Thanks to the financial support of different institutions (the municipalities served, Grand Picardy coast (formerly SMACOPI), General Council, Regional Council, State - DRAC, European Union etc.) enabled the CFBS to perform maintenance of the tracks, stations and equipment. All this caused a continuous increase in the number of visitors in the mid- 1990s, which increased from 20,000 to 100,000 per year. In 2011, the association exceeded the symbolic threshold of 150,000 passengers and there were more than 162,000 passengers carried in 2013.

Although the whole line is preserved, the section from Saint-Valery to Cayeux is operated only on certain days between April and September, including all but 4 days in July and August. Five of the minor stations or halts are still in use, in addition to the stations in the above named towns.

== The staff ==
The SFBC is an association made up of over 400 members, including at least 80 active volunteers, and employs the equivalent of 22 full-time employees. The CFBS self-finances its operating costs (salaries, maintenance, coal, etc.) and participates in investments (facilities, infrastructure, equipment etc.)

== Railway installations ==
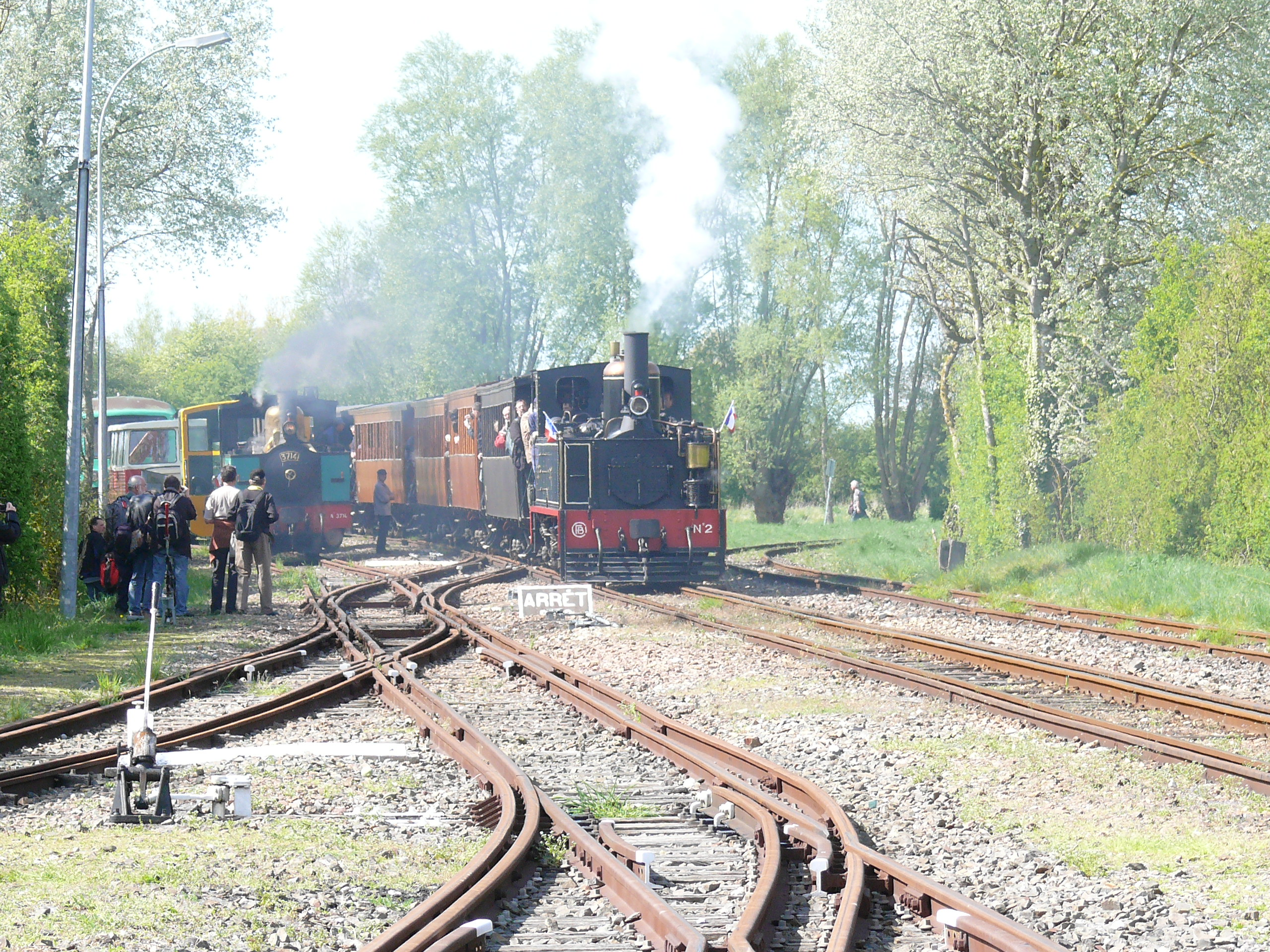
Approaching Noyelles sur Mer. Note the metre gauge track laid within the standard gauge track.

The CFBS operates its network with meter-gauge track, but dual-gauge track remains between the station Noyelles and Saint-Valery Port. Transhipment facilities for cargo still exist in Noyelles that are used in every Steam Festival. The various lines are single track, with passing loops in the station, allowing trains to cross. Except Noyelles station, equipped with a mechanical signaling system of the old SNCF type, there is little signalling on the line, and traffic safety is ensured by instructions. A Line Manager ensures the operational use of the network and can communicate by "ground-to-train" radio with all trains. Automatic level crossings are installed at intersections with major roads and unguarded crossings to other crossings. The workshop equipment is installed in Saint-Valery Canal Station. Turntables exist at Noyelles, Saint-Valery Ville and Port, Le Crotoy and at Cayeux. However, the locomotives can travel in both directions of traffic without being rotated. E.332 is the only CFBS locomotive which cannot be turned on any of the turntable except Saint-Valery Port.

There is still a track connection with the SNCF which is commonly used during the Steam Festival.

== Gauge ==
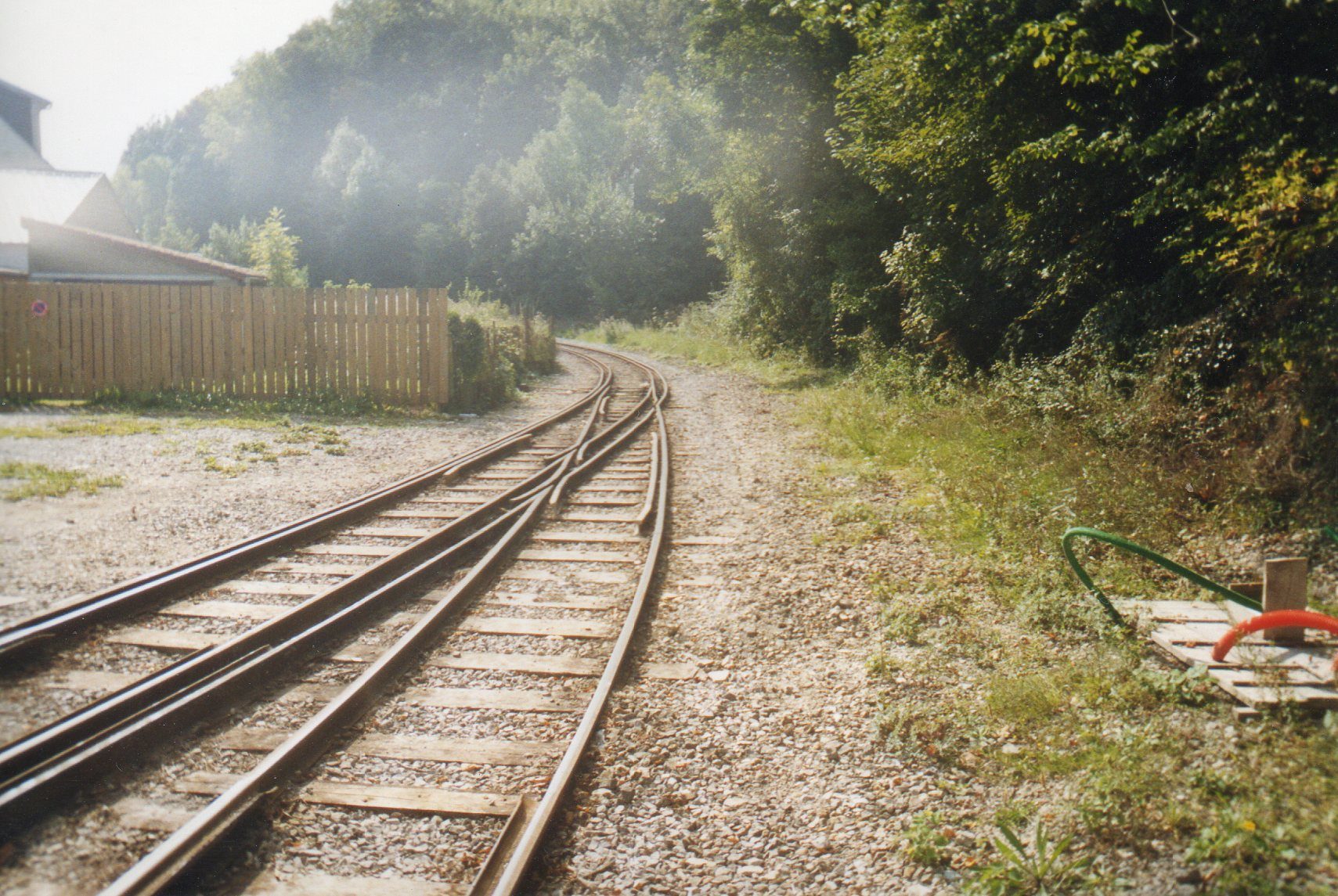
A metre gauge point within standard gauge track at Saint-Valery sur Somme

The line from Noyelles sur Mer to Le Crotoy is metre gauge.

The line from Noyelles sur Mer to Saint-Valery Ville is of dual gauge, with metre gauge tracks laid within standard gauge track, thus having four rails. At Saint-Valery there is a branch to the Saint-Valery docks which is dual gauge, but having three rails only. The line from Saint-Valery Ville to Cayeux (Brighton Plage) is metre gauge.

== The Festival of Steam ==
The Festival of steam was organized for the first time in 1988 on the occasion of the centenary of the Network de Bains de Mer. The CFBS organized a steam engine rally in Noyelles-sur-Mer, the point of correspondence between the Network Bains de Mer and that of the SNCF . It quickly became a major event, and the CFBS reorganizes it every three years, with many steam engines from all over the Europe. It has become a major event for lovers of railways but also for the people of the Somme bay and tourists. The railway is of course put forward, but also the tractors, buses, rolls, saws ... and many other machines from the past are exhibited. The last event took place on 27 and 28 April 2013 . The association has set up a website dedicated to the event, which recounts the various steam events (until 2009 ). For the 2013 event, many materials have come from other networks including seven steam locomotives (including 150 p. 13 of the Train City and 020 Peckett n o 12 "Marcia" of the Kent & East Sussex Railway ), several carriages and a Sprague-Thomson of Paris metro owned by ADEMAS . This event welcomed nearly 21,000 visitors including 7,250 travelers.

== Stations ==
From Le Crotoy to Cayeux the stations are:

=== Le Crotoy ===
50°13′12″N 1°37′53″E
This station is on the metre gauge branch from Noyelles, opened on 1 July 1887. There is a shed where the steam engines can be stored and light maintenance can be carried out.

=== Favières ===
50°13′02″N 1°39′35″E
A small halt serving the village of Favières.

=== Morlay ===
50°12′33″N 1°40′48″E
A small halt serving the village.

=== Noyelles-sur-Mer ===
50°11′13″N 1°42′15″E
A station was opened at Noyelles in 1847, being on the standard gauge line between Boulogne and Amiens. In 1858 a single track branch opened to Saint-Valery sur Somme. Metre gauge branches opened to Le Crotoy and Cayeux in 1887, the latter being laid between the rails of the standard gauge branch to Saint-Valery. The final line to be built to Noyelles was a metre gauge branch to Forest l'Abbaye which opened on 24 August 1892 and closed to passengers on 10 March 1947 and freight on 1 February 1951.

=== Saint-Valery Canal ===
50°10′34″N 1°39′08″E

This was the site of the original terminus of the standard gauge branch from Noyelles, opened on 5 June 1858. It is now the site of their depot, although some of the original buildings still survive.

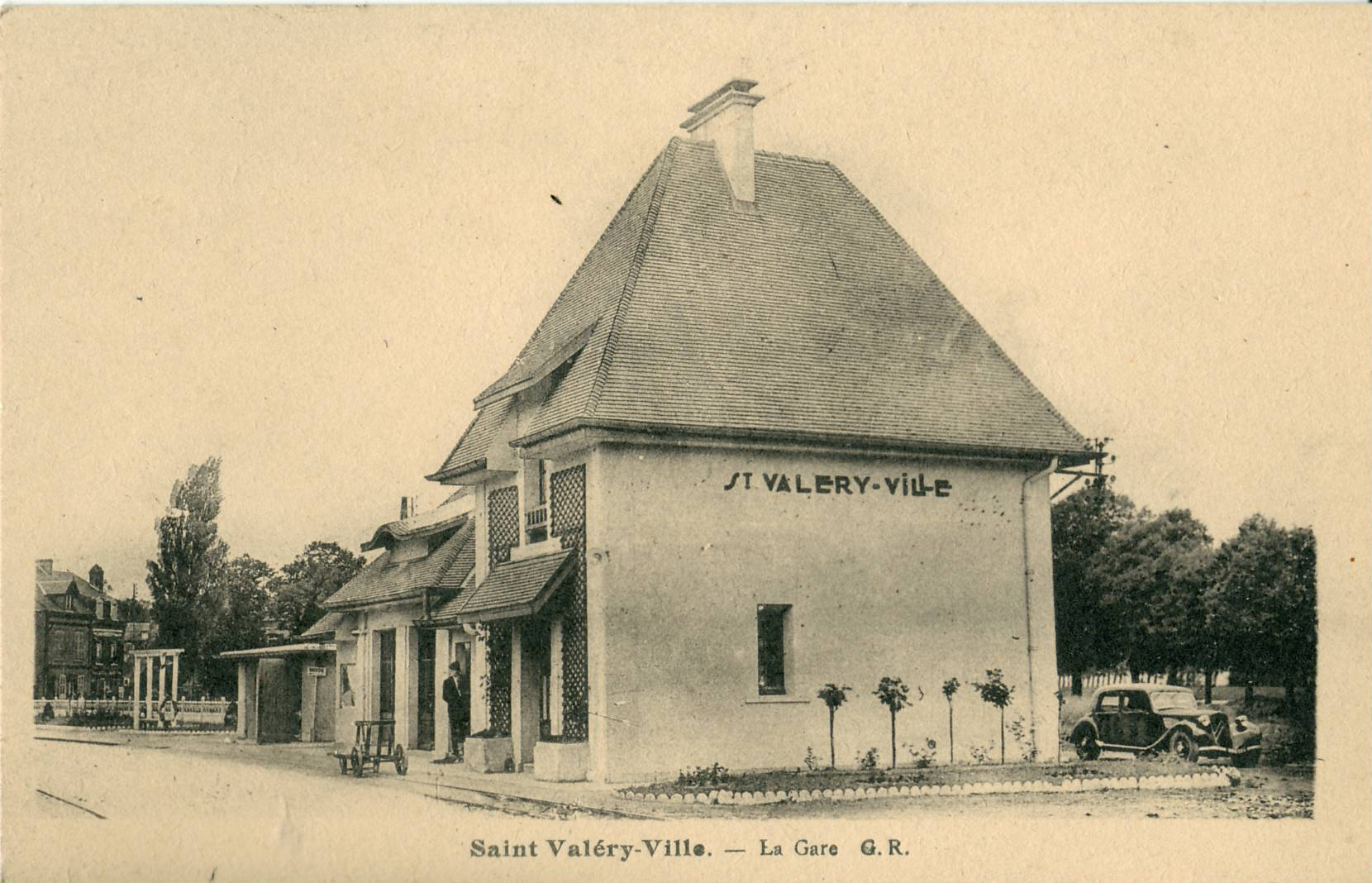
Saint-Valery Ville station from an old postcard.

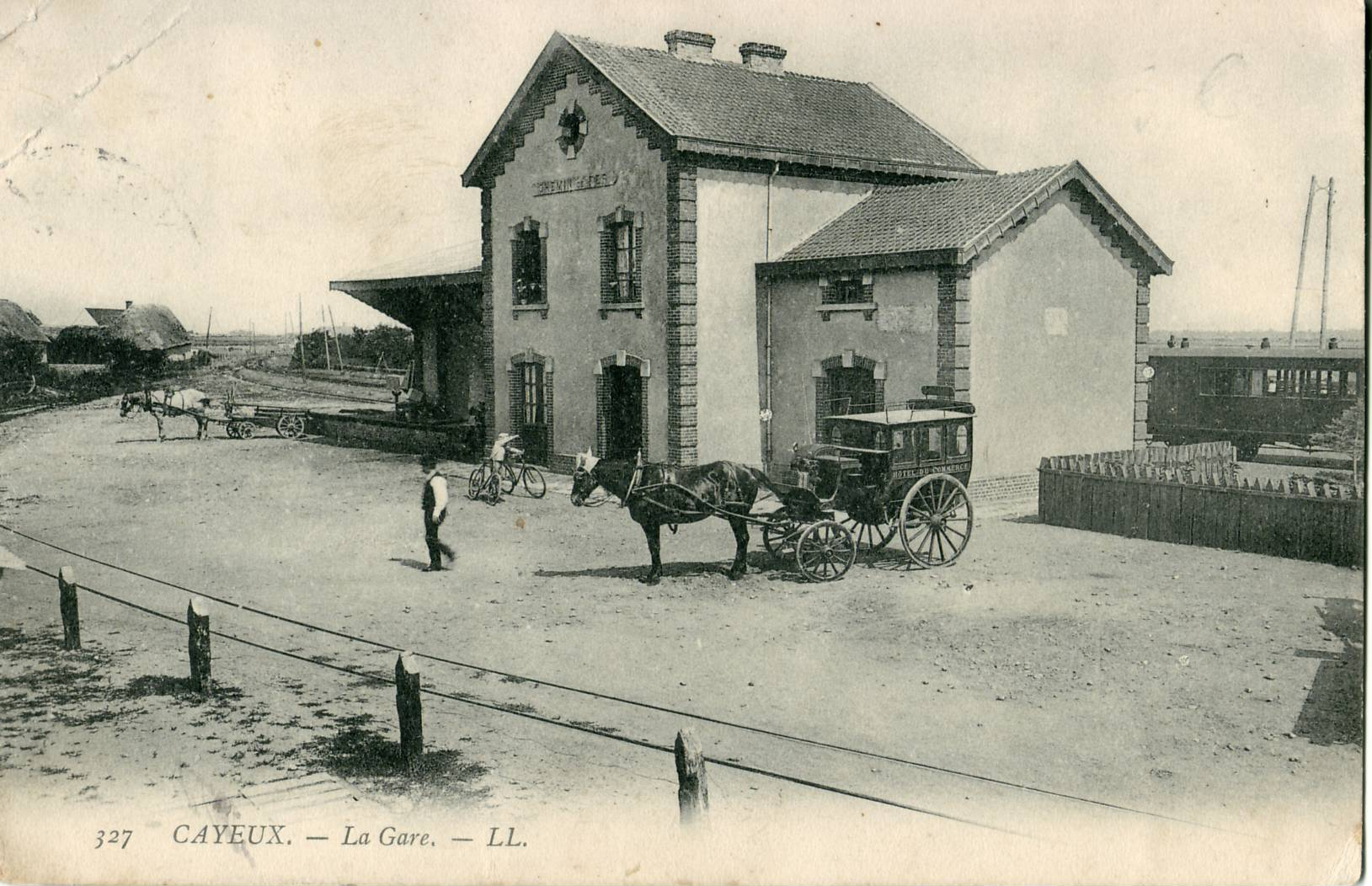
Cayeux station from an old postcard

=== Saint-Valery Port ===
50°11′00″N 1°38′37″E
This was the main station for Saint-Valery when the dual gauge line was opened in 1887, the station at Saint-Valery Ville then being a halt.

=== Saint-Valery Ville ===
50°10′44″N 1°38′38″E

This station opened on 6 September 1887. The station has always been dual gauge.

=== Pendé Routhiauville ===
50°10′22″N 1°35′16″E
A small halt serving the villages of Pendé and Routhiauville.

=== Lanchères Pendé ===
50°10′00″N 1°33′51″E
This station is on the metre gauge branch from Noyelles to Cayeux, it opened on 6 September 1887 and serves the villages of Lanchères and Pendé.

=== Hurt ===
50°10′21″N 1°32′13″E
This halt was opened in 1890 after local people called for a station to be built.

=== Cayeux (Brighton Plage) ===
50°10′47″N 1°30′03″E

This station is the terminus of the metre gauge branch from Noyelles. It opened on 6 September 1887. In 1912, a 54 metres (59 yd) extension was built to serve a 500 mm (19 3/4 in) or 600 mm (1 ft 11 5/8 in) gauge railway worked by horses to bring galets (flints) for onward shipment. Another short extension was also built at Cayeux after WWII to serve the Sansom factory; this was in use until the 1960s.

== Rolling stock ==
The "Association du Chemin de Fer de la Baie de Somme" has restored a number of locomotives, railbuses, carriages and wagons to full use, others await overhaul or restoration. All vehicles are metre gauge unless otherwise denoted.

=== Steam locomotives ===
None of the original steam locomotives that worked on the Réseau des Bains de Mer have survived into preservation. The locomotive that most represents those that did work the line is the Haine-St.-Pierre loco, which carries works number 1316/1921. A group of eleven similar locos, works numbers 1304-14 inclusive were built in 1921 for the SE, and four of those are known to have worked on the Réseau des Bains de Mer system, including the CFBS lines.

CFBS number	Name	Wheel Type	Builder	Year	Power	Serial number		Notes
N°25	La Verte	0-4-0T	Corpet-Louvet	1927		1672		ex Enterprise Paul Frot. In working order.
N°1	Aisne	2-6-0T	Corpet-Louvet	1906		1092		ex Régie Département des Transports de l'Aisne. Restored in 2006. In working order. Classified historic monument.
N°2		2-6-0T	Cail	1889		2296	130T Cail N°2296 à voie métrique, N°2 du FCPR, datant de 1889	ex Panama Canal, Ferrocarriles de Puerto Rico, Henry Ford Museum and Traverse City, Michigan. Restored in 2003, revised in 2012 to 2013. In working order.
N°101		0-6-0T	Pinguely	1905		165	Pinguely 030T n°101	ex Chemins de fer du Morbihan, Forges de Gueugnon and Fédération des Amis des Chemins de fer Secondaires (FACS). Restored to service during the Fête de la Vapeur on 27 and 28 April 2013. Classified historic monument.
N°15	Noyon-Guiscard-Lassigny	2-6-0T	Haine-St-Pierre	1920		1316	la 130T N°15 Haine-Saint-Pierre	ex Compagnie Générale des Voies Ferrées d’Intérêt Local (VFIL) Oise. Restored in 1998, revised in 2011, classified Historic Monument. In working order.
N°3714	Beton-Bazoches	0-6-2T	Buffaud-Robatel	1909		-		ex SE (Réseau de Seine & Marne) and FACS. « Beton-Bazoches » In working order. Restored in 1980 and again in 2000 and revised in 2012, classified Historic Monument.
N°E.332		4-6-0T	Fives-Lille	1909		3587	la 230T N°E.332 Fives-Lille	Ex E.332 from Réseau Breton - restored in 2009, in working order.

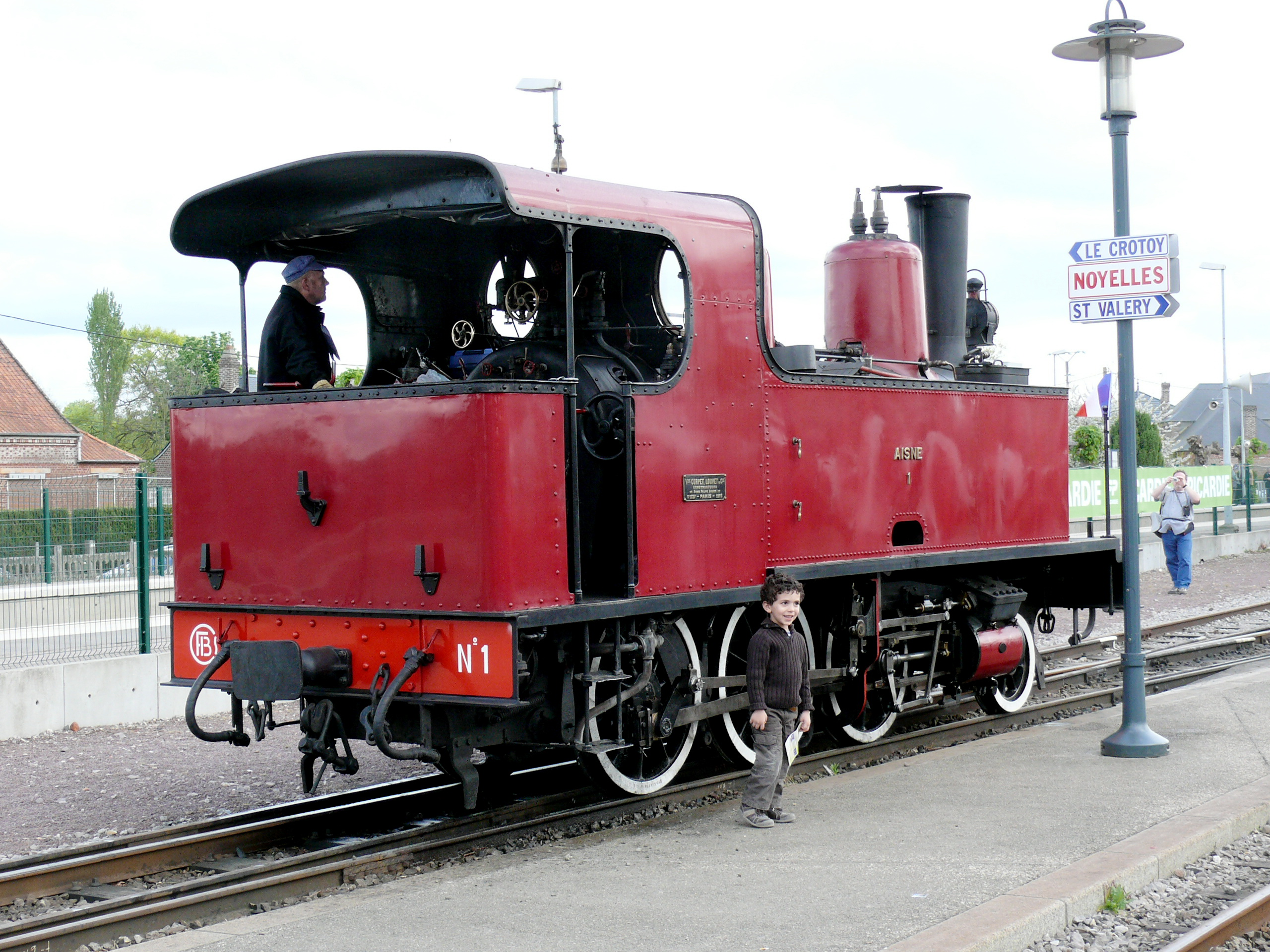
N°1 at Noyelles sur Mer

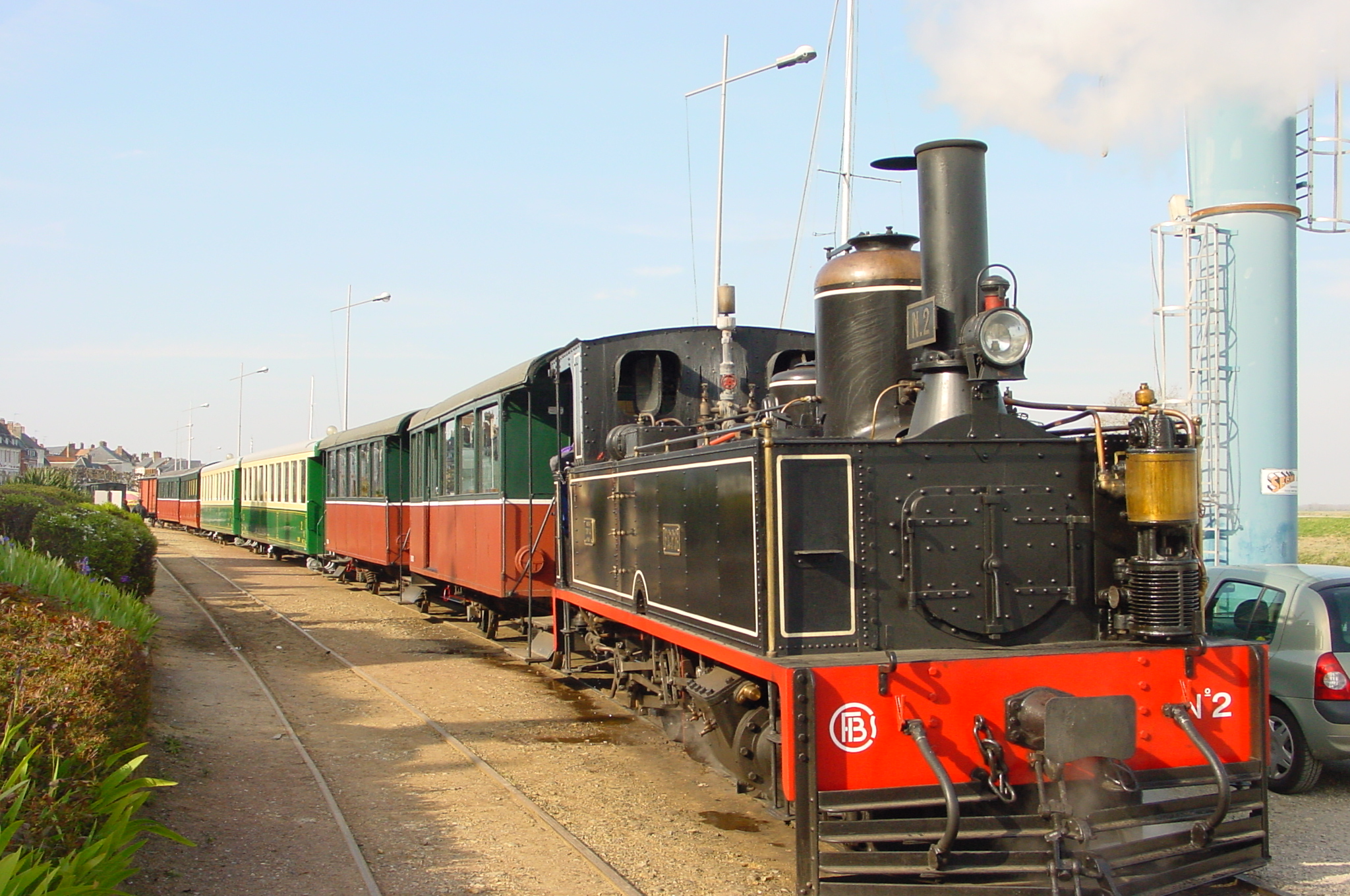
N°2 with a passenger train.

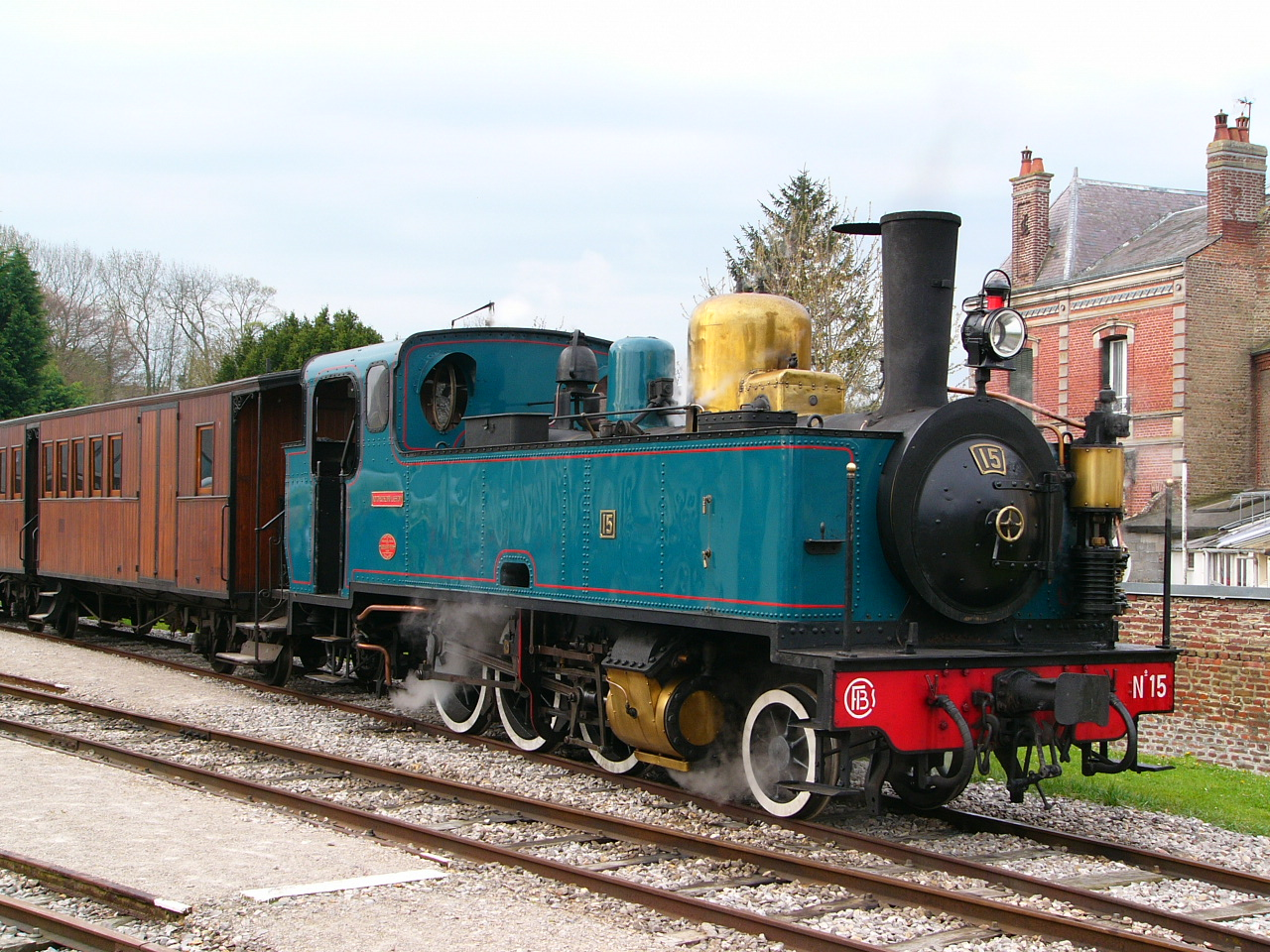
Haine St. Pierre N°15.

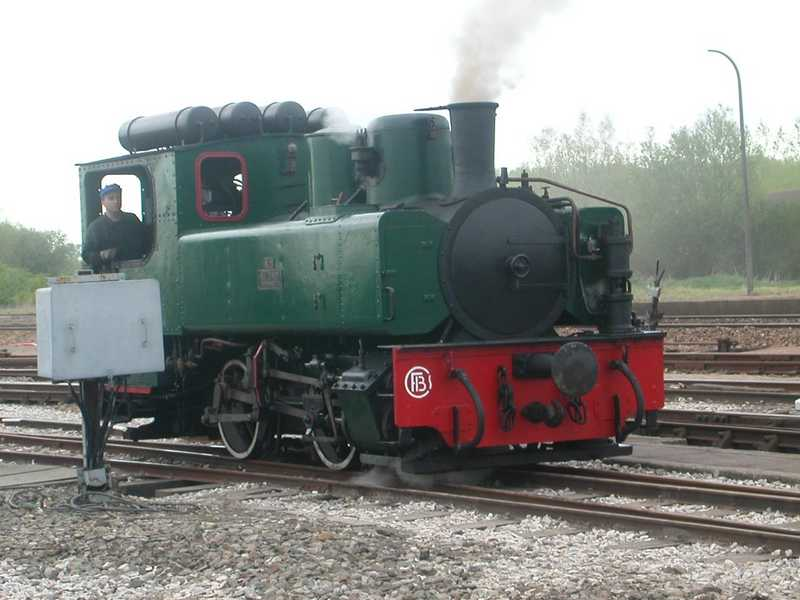
Corpet-Louvet N°25

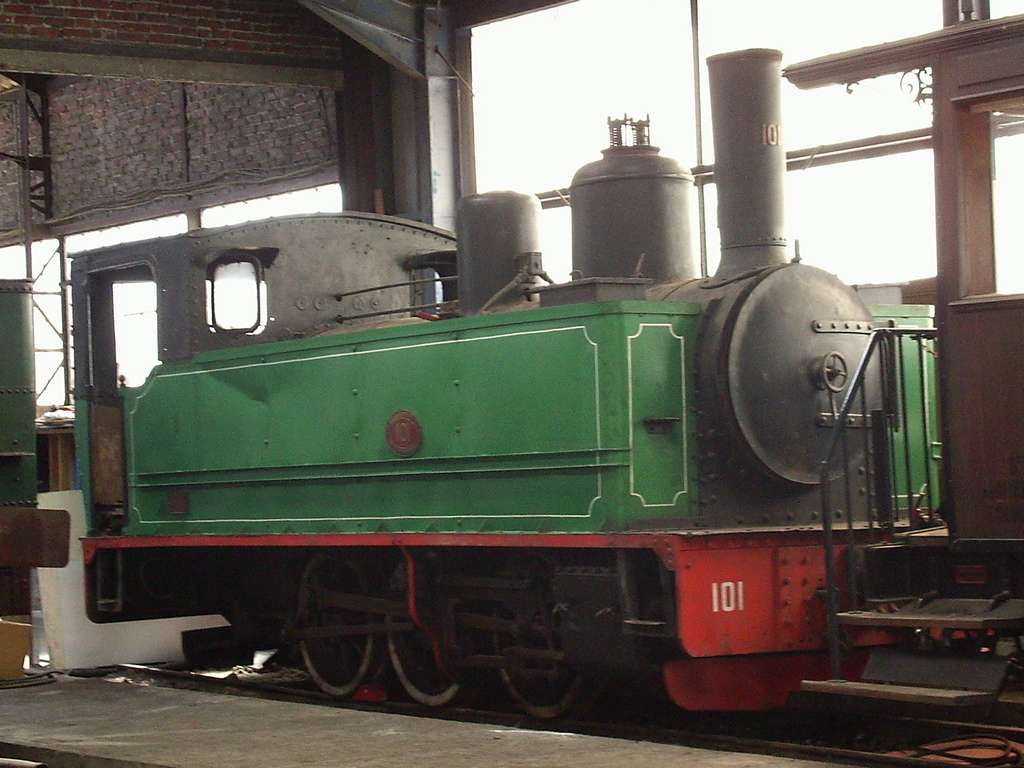
Pinguely N°101 prior to restoration.

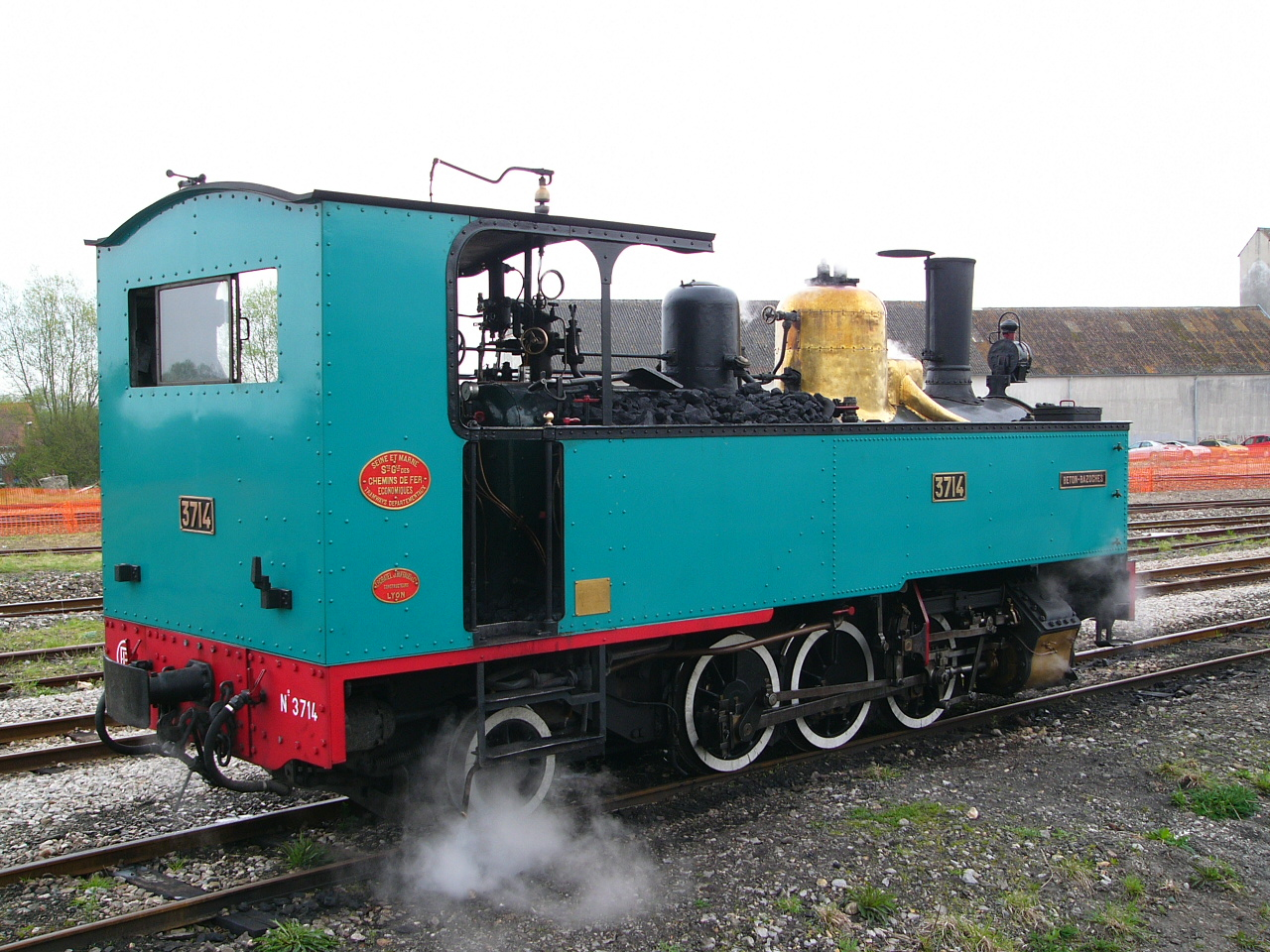
Buffaud et Robatel N°3714

- 12 La Grise Corpet-Louvet 0-4-0T 1589/1921, ex Enterprise Paul Frot, La Chapelle-St Luc, Troyes has been transferred to a touristic network in central France (Train du Bas-Berry). Return is not imminent.
- 15 La Marron Corpet-Louvet 0-4-0T 1667/1925, ex Enterprise Paul Frot. Stopped since the mid-seventies. Now owned by the Fédération des amis des chemins de fer secondaires.

==== Saint-Valery scrapyard ====
- Corpet-Louvet 0-6-0T 1104/1904, ex Lunéville-Einville railway and Sablières de la Haute et Basse Seine.
- Corpet-Louvet 0-6-0T 927/1903, ex Economique des Charentes No.47.
- Schneider 0-6-2T built 1891, ex Département de la Côte d'Or. Removed in 2014 and now at MTVS in Crèvecœur-le-Grand.
- Pinguely 0-6-0T, ex Chemins de Fer du Beaujolais No.8. Removed in 1997 and now under restoration at Angers, France.

=== Diesel locomotives ===
- 301, 6w diesel, VFIL Lumbres built 1948. ex VFIL Pas-de-Calais, Réseau de Développement Technologique (RDT) Ardennes, VFIL Lumbres, VFIL Flandres.
- 351, 6w diesel, VFIL Lumbres built 1948, ex VFIL Flandres.
- 352, 6w diesel, VFIL Lumbres built 1948, ex VFIL Flandres.
- 824, 6w diesel, Sociedad Español de Construccion Naval built 1966. Ex Ferrocarrils de la Generalitat de Catalune, Barcelona.
- BA-12, 6w diesel. Ateliers CFD de Neuillé-Pont-~Pierre, Indre-er-Loire built 1941–45. Ex CFD Indre-et-Loire, Chemin de fer du Blanc-Argent.
- Y-2107, 4w diesel, Baudet Donnon Roussel built 1952. Ex SNCF Y2100 class and John Deere, Fleury-les-Aubrais, Loire. Standard gauge.

=== Railbuses ===
- M-31, 2 axle railcar built by VFIL Lumbres, ex VFIL Flandres and CFTA.
- M-41, Bogie railcar built by VFIL Lumbres 1936, ex VFIL Pas-de-Calais, VFIL Flandres and CFTA.
- M-42, Bogie railcar built by VFIL Lumbres 1936, ex VFIL Pas-de-Calais, VFIL Oise and CFTA.
- M-43, Bogie railcar built by VFIL Lumbres 1936, ex VFIL Pas-de-Calais, VFIL Oise and CFTA.
- R6, Bogie railcar trailer, built as a railcar by Billard in 1937, ex Tramways Ille-et-Vilaine, RB and CFTA.
- X-157, Bogie railcar built by De Dion-Bouton 1937, ex Chemin de Fer des Côtes-du-Nord (CdN), RB and CFTA.
- X-212, Bogie railcar built by (Verney) 1951, ex Blanc-Argent BA-SNCF
- A two axle draisine built by Campagne in 1930, ex CFTA.

=== Surviving SE/CFTA rolling stock ===
==== Carriages ====
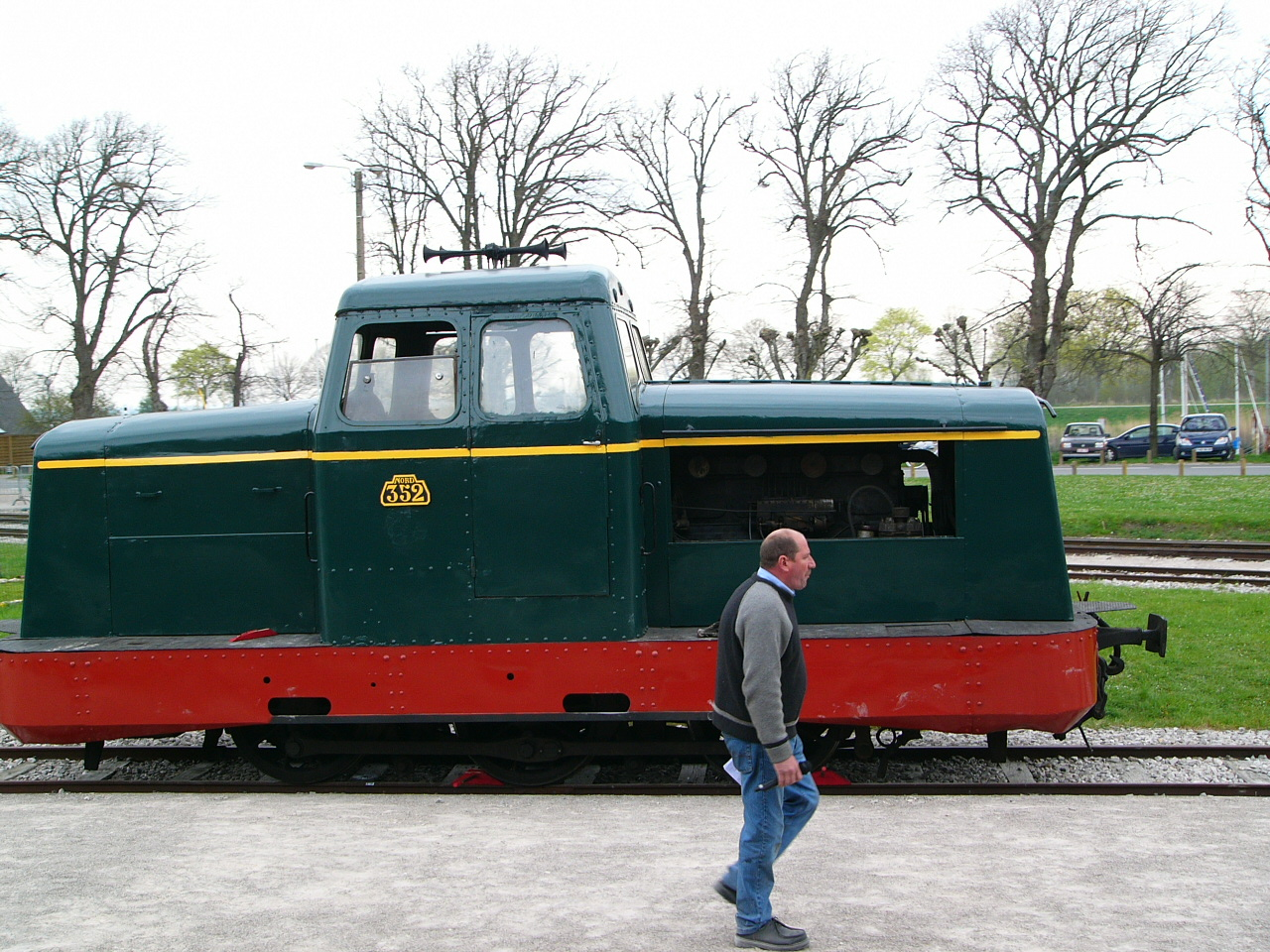
Locomotive N° 352

- ACf10302, 1st/3rd bogie coach built 1920 by Manage, Belgium.
- ACf10303, 1st/3rd bogie coach built 1920 by Manage, Belgium. Being restored.
- ACf10305, 1st/3rd bogie coach built 1920 by Manage, Belgium. Out of service.
- ACf10308, 1st/3rd bogie coach built 1920 by Manage, Belgium.
- BCf10501, 2nd/3rd bogie coach built 1920 by Manage, Belgium. Listed.
- BCf10502, 2nd/3rd bogie coach built 1920 by Manage, Belgium. In green livery.
- BCf10504, 2nd/3rd bogie coach built 1920 by Manage, Belgium. In green livery.
- BCf10507, 2nd/3rd bogie coach built 1920 by Manage, Belgium. Listed
- BCf10508, 2nd/3rd bogie coach built 1920 by Manage, Belgium. Listed
- BCf10509, 2nd/3rd bogie coach built 1920 by Manage, Belgium.
- BCf10510, 2nd/3rd bogie coach built 1920 by Manage, Belgium. In green livery. Listed.
- ex-PLM ( Ligne d'Orange à Buis-les-Baronnies, SE operation) built by Decauville 1906
- ABef 4, being restored
- ABef 5, in service
- ABCDf 105, bogie coach built 1894 by De Dietrich, ex RB / CFTA

==== Baggage Vans ====
- D10801, 4 wheel fourgon, ex SE Allier, SE Somme/CFTA
- D series, 4 wheel fourgon, sold to the Musée des tramways à vapeur et des chemins de fer secondaires français but repurchased in 1995.
- K11008, 4 wheel fourgon, builder unknown.
- K11013, 4 wheel fourgon, builder unknown.
- K12005, 4 wheel fourgon, builder unknown.

==== Freight vehicles ====
- Five four wheeled vans numbered K1210, K1211, K1247, K1254, and K1276, builder unknown.
- Four four-wheeled brake vans numbered K2203, K2206, K2224, and K2225, builder unknown.
- Two four-wheeled flat wagons numbered T9209 and T9220.
- One unnumbered flat wagon built by Magnard in 1911.
- Six four-wheeled tombereaux open wagons numbered U3305, U12087, U13021, U13056, U14008, and U14052, builder unknown.
- One crane numbered G9009
- One crane (unnumbered) built by Baume-et-Marpent.

=== Imported rolling stock ===
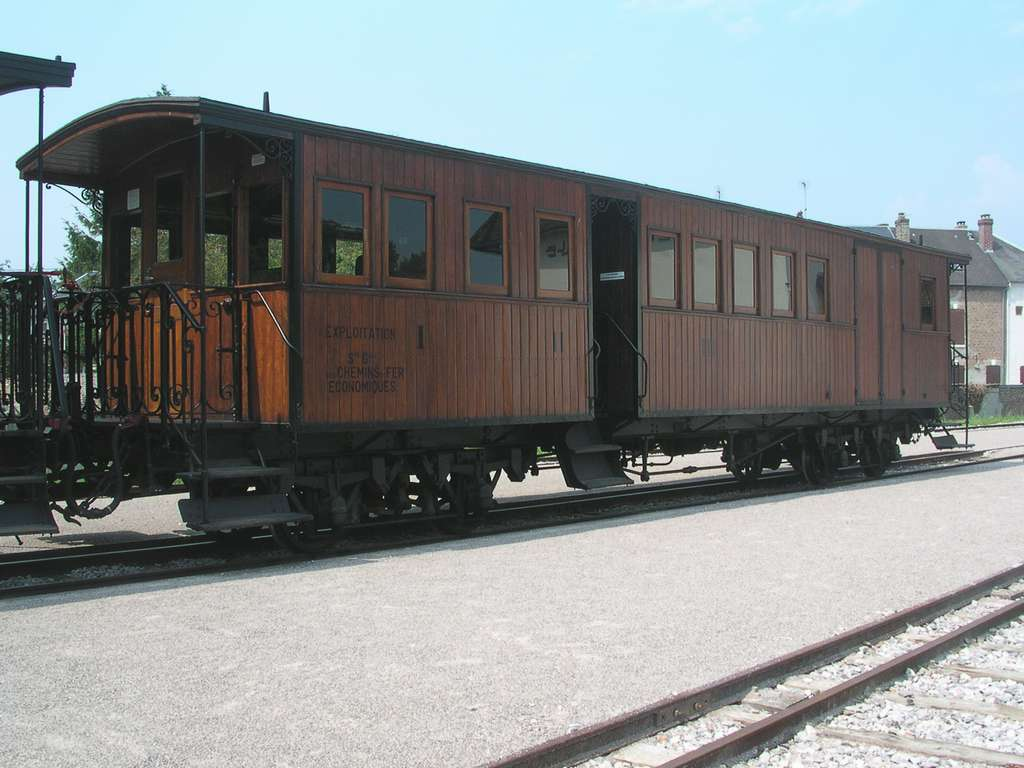
ABCDf12, ex Réseau Breton

==== Carriages ====
- Bogie saloon coach, built by David Desouches et Compagnie in 1889. Ex SE Réseau du Centre, Allier-Cher. Exhibited at the Exposition Universelle, Paris in 1889. Original body on an ex Chemin du Fer de Lozère chassis. The ex-BOB rake is often known as the "Swiss Train".
- BDF 201, 2nd class and baggage compartments (Chemins de fer électriques Veveysans, Schlieren construction 1911).
- Bf 204, 2nd class compartment (Chemins de fer électriques Veveysans, Schlieren construction 1911).
- Bf 22, ex C22- 2nd class compartment (Chemin de fer Yverdon-Ste-Croix, construction SIG Neuhausen 1893).
- BDf 26, ex C27 became BC12 in 1907 and C26 in 1924- 2nd class and baggage compartments (Chemin de fer Yverdon-Ste-Croix, construction SIG Neuhausen 1893).
- Bf 27, converted from BDf 27 (returned to original state), ex C21, which became BC 13 in 1907 and C27 in 1924. 2nd class compartment (Chemin de fer Yverdon-Ste-Croix, construction SIG Neuhausen 1893).
- Bf 31, Second class compartment (Chemin de Fer Yverdon-Ste-Croix, construction SIG Neuhausen 1929).
- Bf 32, Second class compartment (Chemin de Fer Yverdon-Ste-Croix, construction SIG Neuhausen 1929). Now in Green and Cream livery.
- Bf 231, 2nd class coach with centre WC (Bernese Oberland railway, building GIS/WAB 1952).
- Bf 236, 2nd class coach with centre WC (Bernese Oberland railway, construction SIG Neuhausen 1954/1956).
- Bf 237, 2nd class coach with centre WC (Bernese Oberland railway, construction SIG Neuhausen 1954/1956).
- ABF 207, 1st class and 2nd class composite coach with centre WC (Bernese Oberland railway, construction SIG Neuhausen 1954/1956).
- ABF 208, 1st class and 2nd class composite coach with centre WC (Bernese Oberland railway, construction SIG Neuhausen 1954/1956).
- ABF 210, 1st class and 2nd class composite coach with centre WC (Bernese Oberland railway, construction SIG Neuhausen 1954/1956).
- B 2212, awaiting restoration / redevelopment for the dining train (Rhaetian Railway, built in 1913 SIG, metallic in 1960)
- B 2214, awaiting restoration / redevelopment for the dining train (Rhaetian Railway, built in 1913 SIG, metallic in 1960)
- B 3816, restaurant car, awaiting restoration for the dining train (Rhaetian Railway, built in 1913 SIG, metallic in 1960)
- B 3817, restaurant car, awaiting restoration for the dining train (Rhaetian Railway, built in 1913 SIG, metallic in 1960)

==== Baggage Vans ====
- Dz 62, Chemin de Fer Yverdon-Ste-Croix (Switzerland), bogies ex BC15, SIG 1912.
- Df 422, SWS 1905, ex Chemins de fer électriques de la Gruyèr, formerly K301.
- Df 522, SIG 1916, former Bernese Oberland railway, BOB (Switzerland).
- Df 523, SIG 1908, former Bernese Oberland railway, BOB (Switzerland), fitted with a kitchen and assigned to the dining train.
- Df 803, ex-SE, built by Blanc Misseron.
- Df 852, ex-SE, built by Blanc Misseron, restored in July 2011.
- Df 10,801, former SE (formerly used as a ticket office at St Valery Port).

==== Freight vehicles ====
- Four four-wheeled vans numbered K434, K502, Kf1390, and one unnumbered K series van, builder unknown, ex RB.
- One four-wheeled van numbered K603, built by Schlieren in 1903, ex Chemin de Fer Electrique de Gruyère and Chemin de Fer Clonay-Chamby.
- One four-wheeled unnumbered K series brake van, ex RB.
- One bogie flat wagon numbered MMX3, possibly German origin, ex RDT Ardennes/CFTA.
- Three four-wheeled flat wagons numbered M302, M309, and M310, built by Neuhausen in 1893, ex CF YStC.
- One four-wheeled flat wagon numbered M305 built by Pétolat in 1905, ex CF YStC.
- One flat wagon, builder unknown, ex Entreprise Paul Frot.
- One four-wheeled tombereau built by Pétolat in 1905, ex CF YStC.
- Three four-wheeled tomberaux of Italian origin, ex Ferrovia Appennino Centrale and CF YStC.
- Two four-wheeled skip wagons, builder unknown, ex Enterprise Paul Frot.
- Two four-wheeled hopper wagons, builder unknown, ex La Mine Orne.
- One four-wheeled hopper wagon, ex SNCF (standard gauge).

== Twinning ==
The CFBS is twinned with the Kent and East Sussex Railway, a preserved standard gauge railway in England. The twinning agreement was signed on 27 April 1996 at Noyelles. The K&ESR's P Class locomotive was present. The railway is also twinned with the Association des chemins de fer des Côtes-du-Nord on the northwest coast.
