= Favières, Somme =

Favières
- Commune
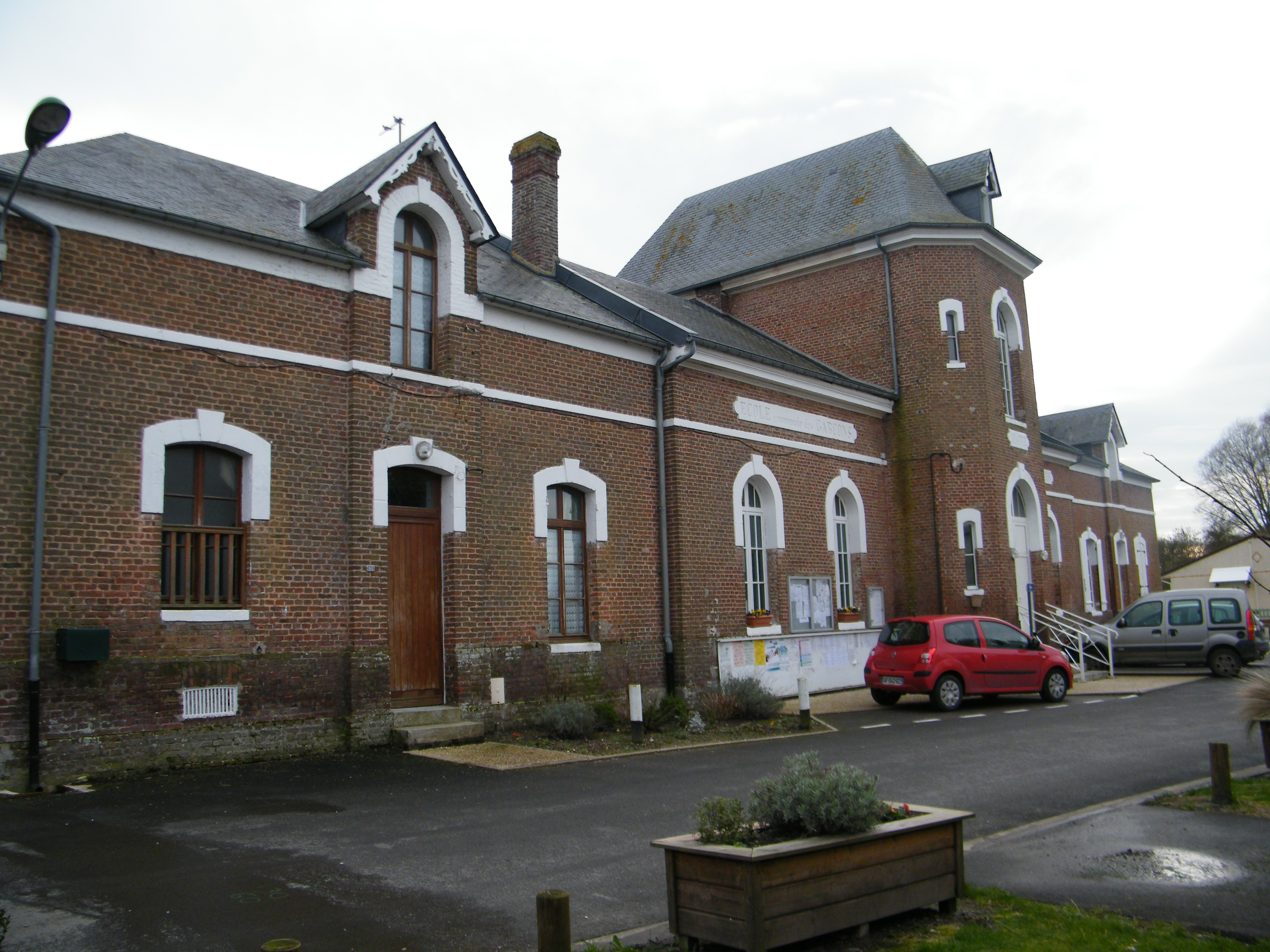
- Town hall
- Location of Favières
- Location within France Location within Hauts-de-France
- Coordinates: 50°14′20″N 1°39′52″E
- Country: France
- Region: Hauts-de-France
- Department: Somme
- Arrondissement: Abbeville
- Canton: Rue
- Intercommunality: CC Ponthieu-Marquenterre

Government
  - Mayor (2025–2032): Michèle Sohet
- Area^{1}: 12.62 km^{2} (4.87 sq mi)
- Elevation: 6 m (20 ft)
- Highest elevation: 5 m (16 ft)
- Lowest elevation: 2 m (6.6 ft)
- Population (2023): 453
  - Density: 35.9/km^{2} (93.0/sq mi)
- Time zone: UTC+01:00 (CET)
  - Summer (DST): UTC+02:00 (CEST)
- INSEE/Postal code: 80303 /80120
- ^{1} French Land Register data, which excludes lakes, ponds, glaciers > 1 km^{2} (0.386 sq mi or 247 acres) and river estuaries.

Favières (French pronunciation: [favjɛʁ]) is a commune in the Somme department in Hauts-de-France in northern France.

== Geography ==
The commune is situated on the D140 road, 2 miles (3 km) from the estuary of the river Somme, some 12 miles (19 km) northwest of Abbeville.

== Railway ==
Favières is served by a halt on the metre gauge railway from Noyelles-sur-Mer to Le Crotoy. The railway is now a heritage railway, the Chemin de Fer de la Baie de Somme, which formerly formed part of the Réseau des Bains de Mer.

== Personalities ==
- Aeronautical engineering pioneers Gaston Caudron (1882) and René Caudron (1884) were born in Favières.

== Population ==
Historical population
Year	Pop.	±% p.a.
1968	438	—
1975	379	−2.05%
1982	403	+0.88%
1990	406	+0.09%
1999	405	−0.03%
2007	456	+1.49%
2012	462	+0.26%
2017	462	+0.00%
2023	453	−0.33%
Source: INSEE

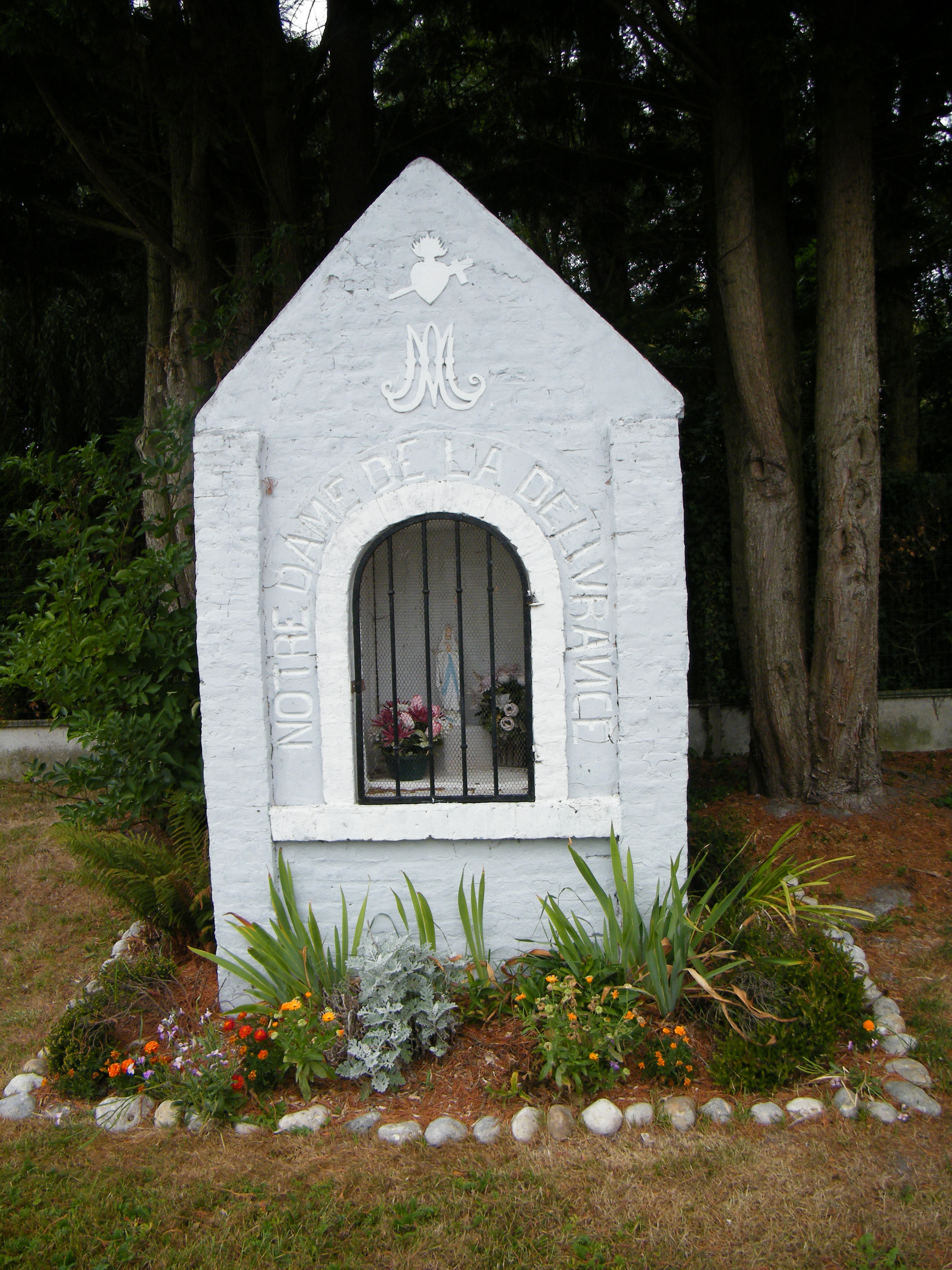
Chapel.

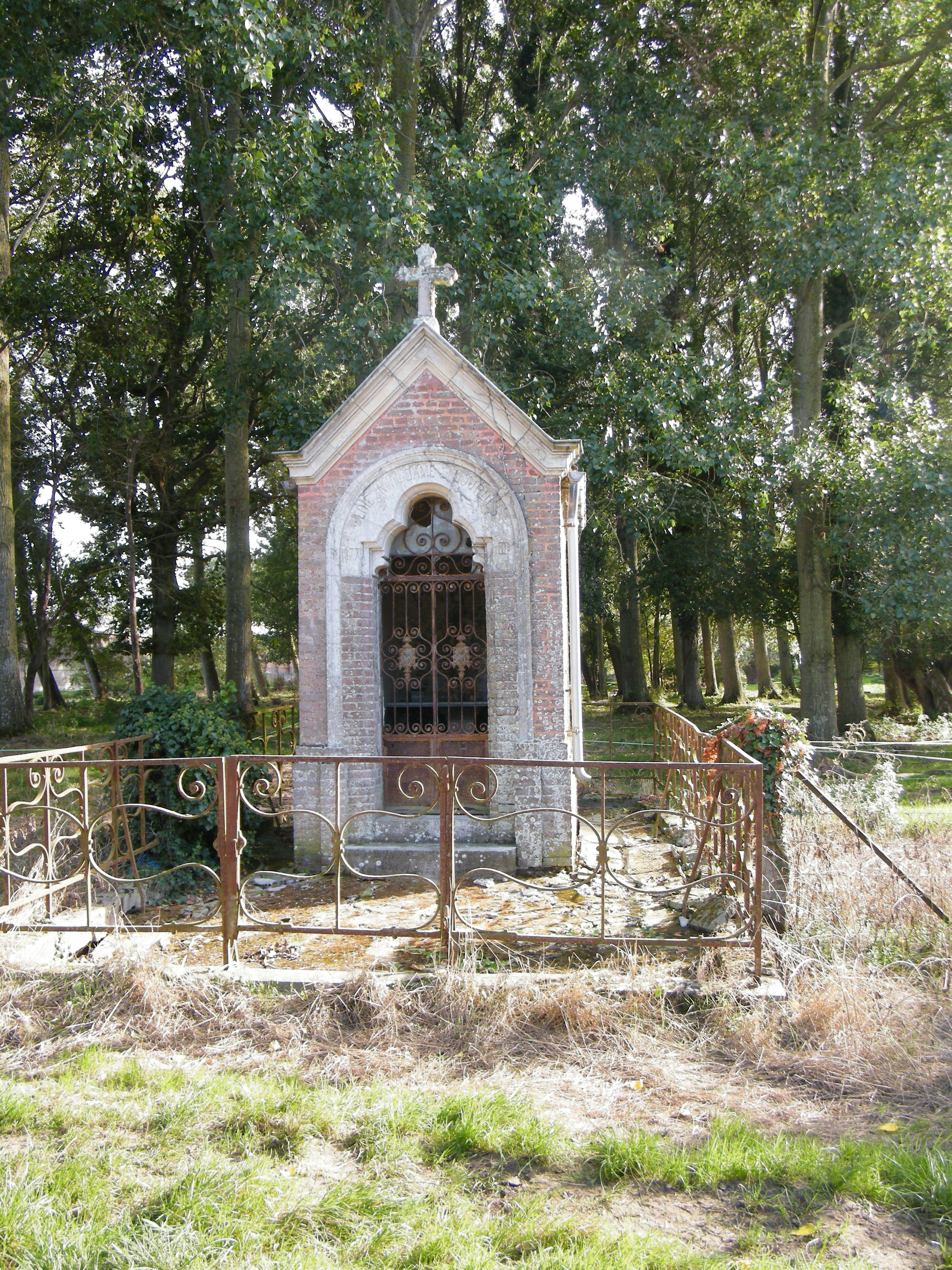
Chapel.

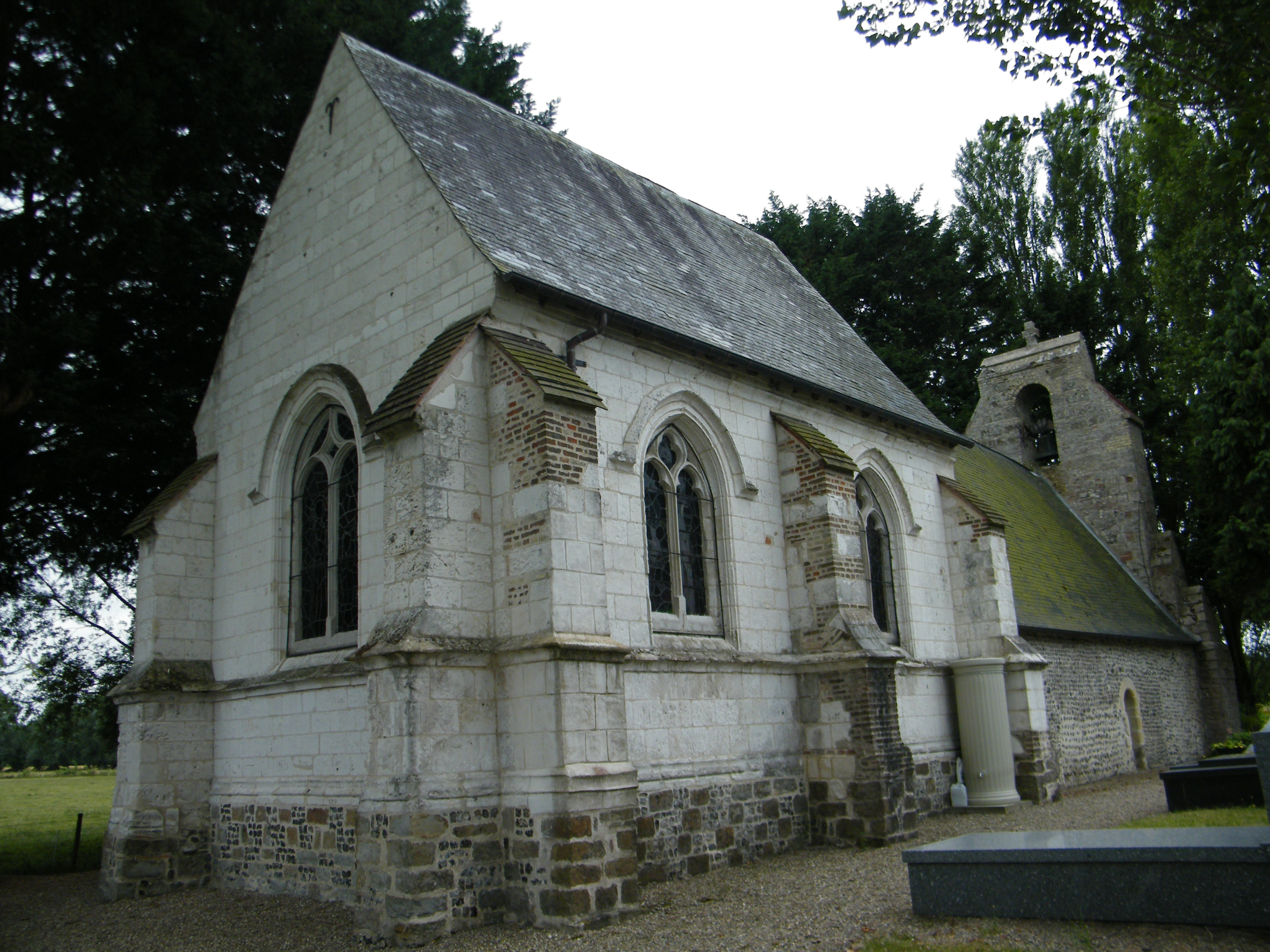
Heritage chapel.

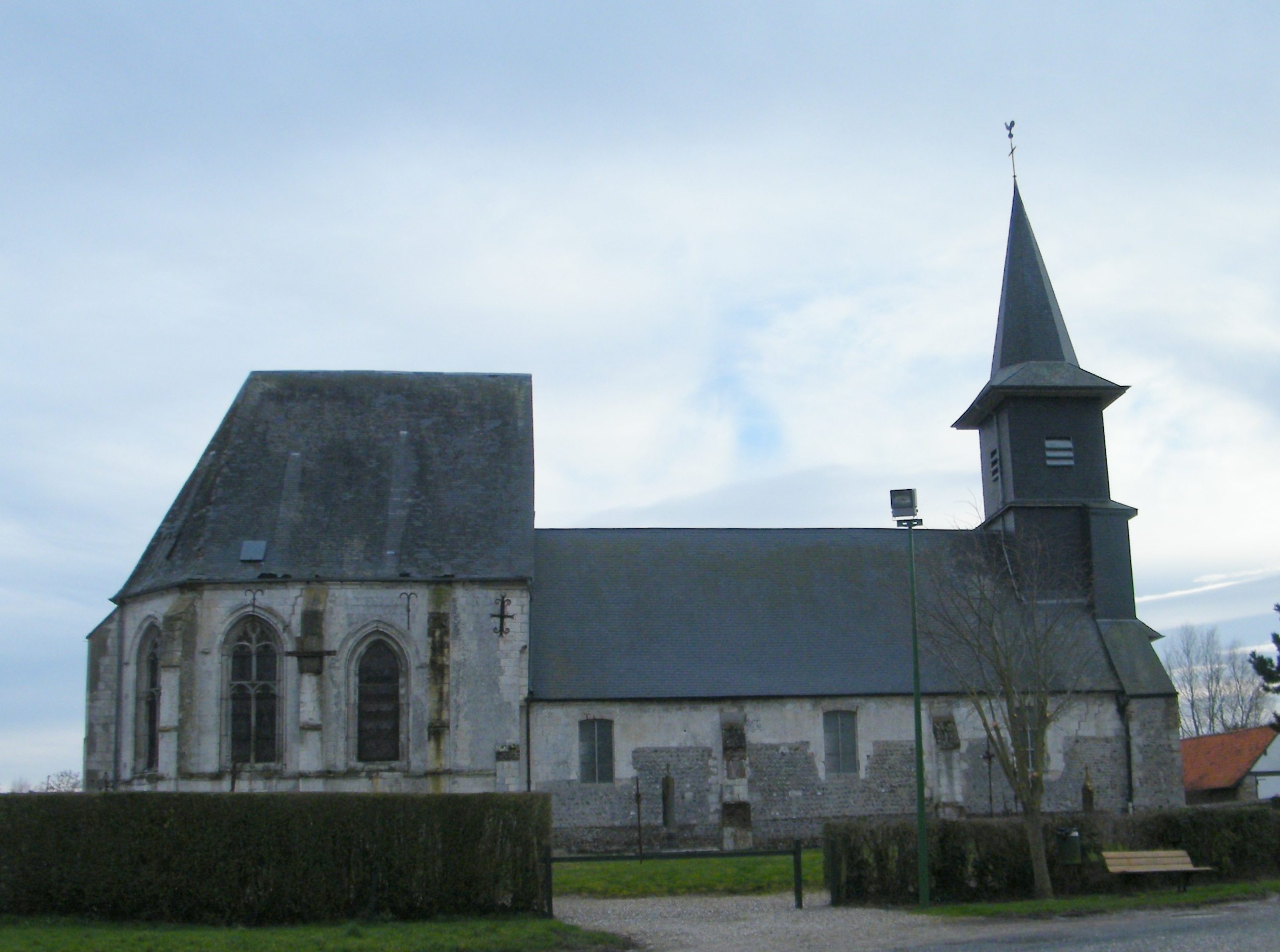
The church.

== See also ==
- Communes of the Somme department
