= Musée Maurice Dufresne =

Museum in France

Coordinates: 47.2793°N 0.3930°E

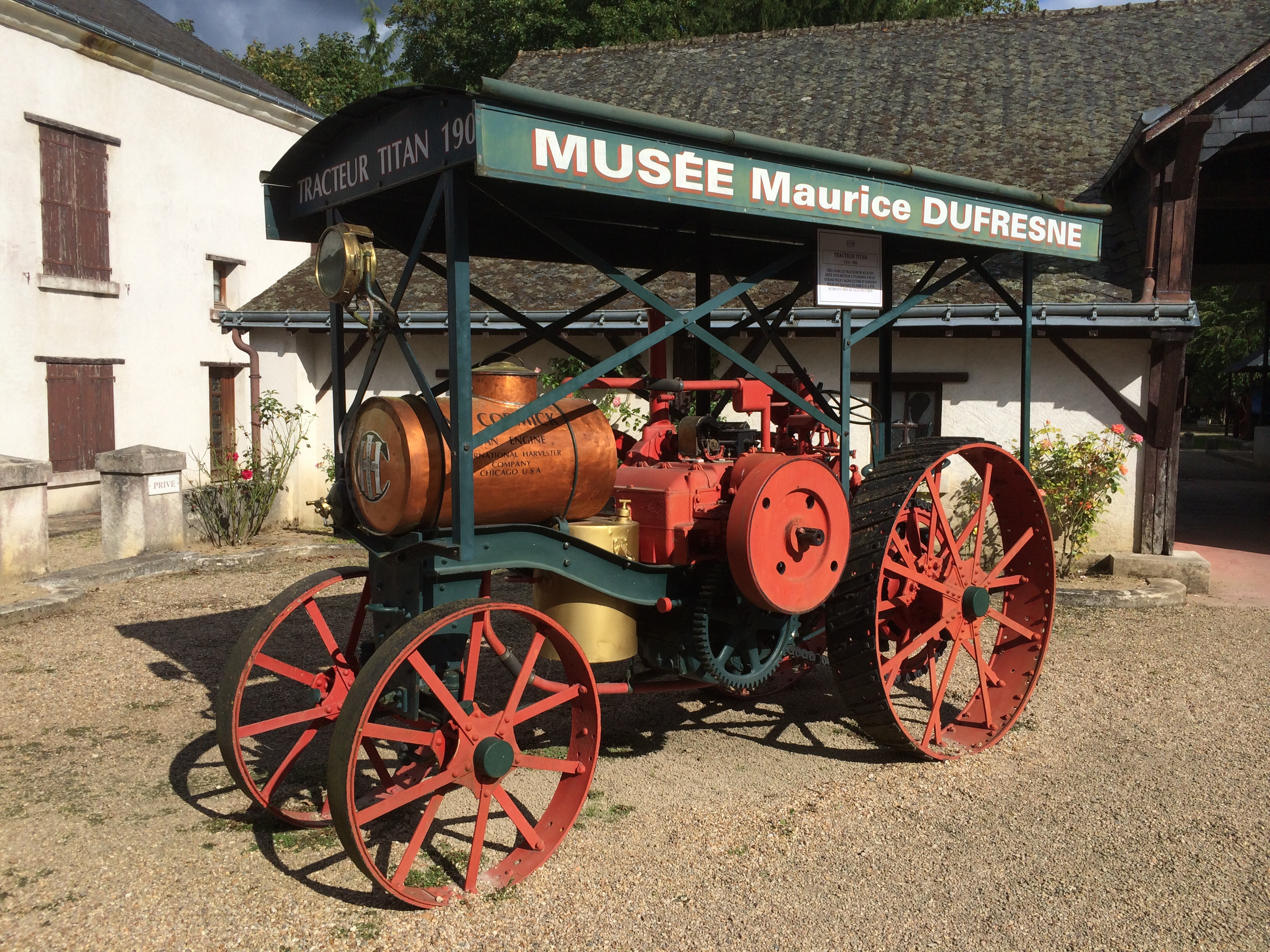
Titan tractor from the 1900s (1900 to 1909?) Bearing the name of the Maurice Dufresne museum. It is located just before the entrance to the covered part of the Maurice Dufresne museum

The Museum of Maurice Dufresne (in French: Musée Maurice-Dufresne) is a technological history museum located in the mill at Marnay, near the Château of Azay-le-Rideau, France. It has acquired numerous important objects displayed in vast buildings containing some 25 rooms. The museum pieces are presented thematically: agricultural machines, silk and textile industries, musketry, hydraulic power, etc.

Born in 1930, Maurice Dufresne began his training as a blacksmith at the age of fourteen and joined the "Compagnons du Devoir", an organization of journeymen -craftsmen, to begin a tour of France, working for twenty different employers.

In 1958, he created his own company in Villeperdue in the region Indre-et-Loire. He started out in the salvage business and began saving things which he thought worthy of placing later in his museum, thereby avoiding the destruction of part of the French heritage.

Thirty years later, on 24 October 1992, the prefect, the notables of the region and the press inaugurated the Museum Maurice Dufresne in Marnay near Azay-le-Rideau, on the banks of the Indre river in an old mill on a site owned by Geoffroy de l'Ile in 1026, which later became a paper factory in the time of Balzac.

The scrap dealer from Villeperdue, armed only with his enthusiasm, was able to create this amazing museum of collections of machines from a road roller to a hearse, from a copper sulfate sprayer to a Louis Blériot monoplane, and to present all of this in enjoyable surroundings.

His museum today presents more than 3,000 machines in warehouses covering 10,000 m^{2}. It has already attracted 600,000 visitors and 23 guestbooks are filled with comments from around the world.

In the last few years, Maurice Dufresne has continually travelled between Marnay and Villeperdue, where 27 people run the medium-sized salvage business.

== Objects in the collection ==
The following is a list of a few pieces from the largest collections presented in the halls of the museum that are open to the public.

Salle des gardiens: Furnished dwelling of the last caretakers from the Papeterie France 1939.

Salle Bassereau: Weaving machines from 1630 to 1950.

Salle Big Bull: Filtz tractor1919 - Big Bull tractor USA 1914 - Truck from Clintonville, Wis USA 1912.

Salle Laffly: Panhard Levassor car1922 - Laffly road-sweeper and waterer 1911 - Le Zèbre car 1902 - Mac Cormick swather USA 1888 - Buick car USA 1950.

Salle Titan: Steam powered fire engine GB 1850 - André Citroën tractor 1919 - Titan Tractor USA 1902 - Morgan car GB 1930 - Renault car type NN 1925.

Salle Marchand: Marchand cognac still 1870 - Guyot high clearance tractor 1930.

Salle de la Révolution: Guillotine 1792 - Scalding vat 1896.

Salle Leyland: Piguet steam engine 1898 - Leyland double decker bus GB 1936.

Salle des lanternes: Coty perfume atomizer 1870 - Chapron tractor 1912 - Steam engine and cocoa bean threshing machine 1880.

Salle d'armes 1: More than four centuries of antique arms from around the world - Collection of wax heads unique in the world 1924.

Salle d'armes 2: More than four centuries of antique arms from around the world - Japanese Samurai's armour 17th century.

Salle Case: Steam tractor Case USA 1907 - Mac Cormick tractor USA 1936.

Salle Maronneau: School museum Maronneau 1856 - Steam engine 1878 - Renault convertible 1923 - Chenard and Walcker car 1926.

Salle George Irat: Car of George Irat 1939 - Hearse Austin Princess-Vanden Plas GB 1947.

Salle Grande Roue: Moline tractor with concrete wheels USA 1920 - Renault crawler tractor HO 1918 - Large paddle wheel 1976.

Salle des mécanismes: Mechanisms of the large paddle wheel 1876 - Scraper pulverizer 1877.

Salle Grand Bi: Velocipede GB 1900 - Motorcycle Benjamin F 1925 - Dulcion tricycle 1900.

Salle des vannes: Bronze wine filter 1850 - Portable copper sulfate sprayer 1880.

Salle Fiat: Bruneau napthtalene motor 1909 - Fiat tractor 1922 - Rustic gas motor-saw log splitter 1925.

Salle de la turbine: Fontaine turbine 1877.

Salle Blériot: Monoplane type XI Louis Blériot 1909 - Ardie side car Germany 1936 - Koppel locomotive Germany 1925.

Salle d'armes 3: More than two centuries of antique arms from around the world.

Salle des outils: A large variety of ordinary tools and craftsmen's tools.

Salle des charrues: A large variety of plows - Meteor linotype 5 USA 1889.

Salle Guillotine: Guillotine thresher 1934 - Peugeot electric car 1941 - Candy dishes 1900.
