= Lanchères =

- Commune
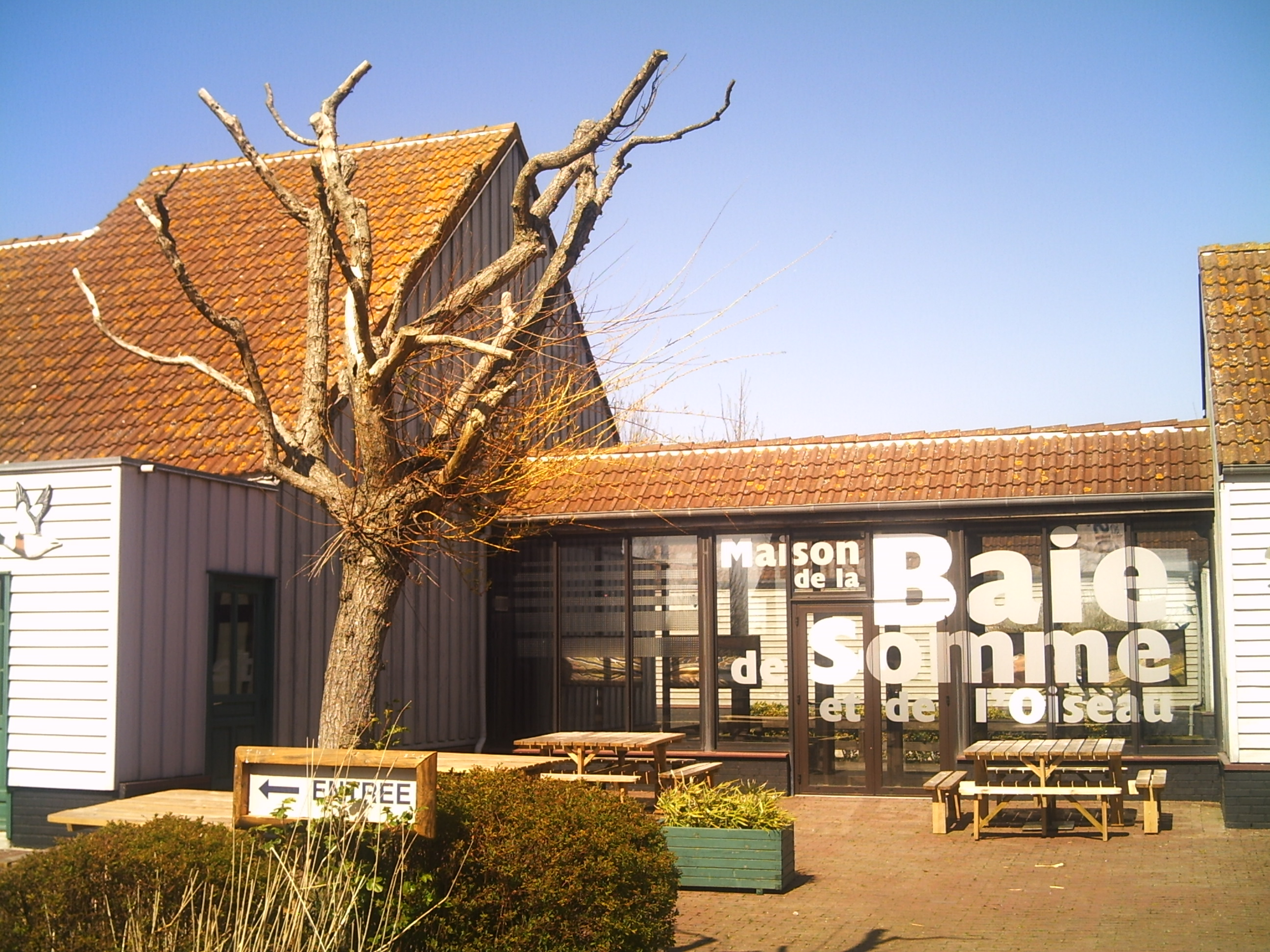
- The "Maison de l'oiseau".

- Coat of arms
- Location of Lanchères
- Location within France Location within Hauts-de-France
- Coordinates: 50°09′34″N 1°33′36″E
- Country: France
- Region: Hauts-de-France
- Department: Somme
- Arrondissement: Abbeville
- Canton: Friville-Escarbotin
- Intercommunality: CA Baie de Somme

Government
  - Mayor (2020–2026): Jean-Yves Blondin
- Area^{1}: 16.39 km^{2} (6.33 sq mi)
- Elevation: 7 m (23 ft)
- Highest elevation: 47 m (154 ft)
- Lowest elevation: 1 m (3.3 ft)
- Population (2023): 859
  - Density: 52.4/km^{2} (136/sq mi)
- Time zone: UTC+01:00 (CET)
  - Summer (DST): UTC+02:00 (CEST)
- INSEE/Postal code: 80464 /80230
- ^{1} French Land Register data, which excludes lakes, ponds, glaciers > 1 km^{2} (0.386 sq mi or 247 acres) and river estuaries.

Lanchères (French pronunciation: [lɑ̃ʃɛʁ]) is a commune in the Somme department in Hauts-de-France in northern France.

== Geography ==
The commune is situated on the D940 road, some 12 miles (19 km) northwest of Abbeville.

== Population ==
Historical population
Year	Pop.	±% p.a.
1968	762	—
1975	797	+0.64%
1982	775	−0.40%
1990	826	+0.80%
1999	834	+0.11%
2007	989	+2.15%
2012	962	−0.55%
2017	915	−1.00%
2023	859	−1.05%
Source: INSEE

== Personalities ==
Paul Vimereu, author, spent his childhood at Lanchères
Jean de Poutrincourt from Poutrincourt, a hamlet of Lanchères. He set sail in 1605 for Acadia, (nowadays Nova Scotia), to be Lieutenant-general. The ruins of his château can still be seen at Poutrincourt.

== See also ==
- Communes of the Somme department
- Réseau des Bains de Mer
- Chemin de Fer de la Baie de Somme
