= Chemins de fer du Morbihan =

Railway in France

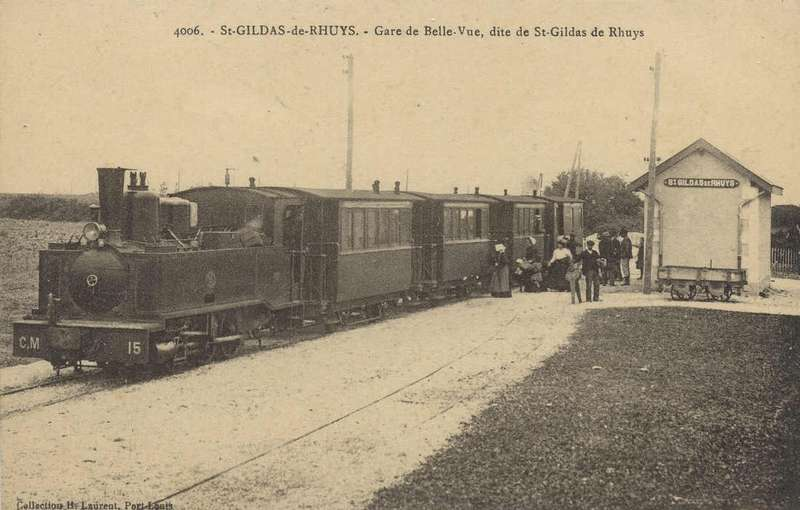
St. Gildas station, CM

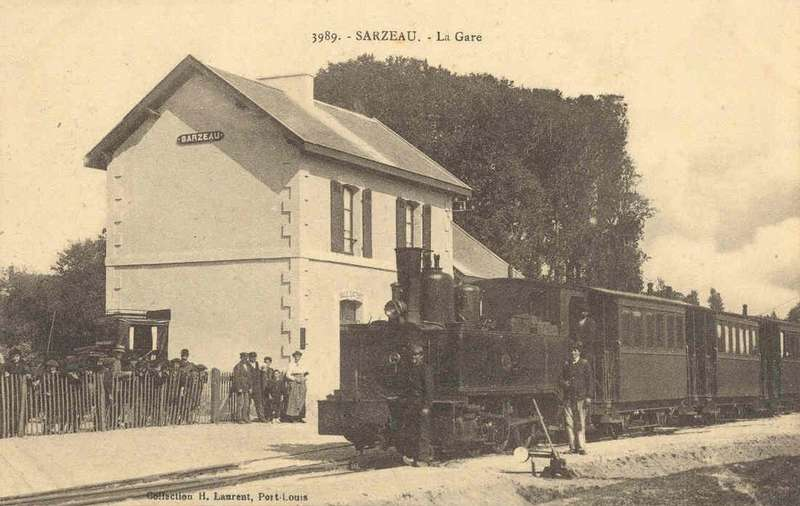
Sarzeau station, CM

The Chemins de fer du Morbihan (CM) was a metre gauge railway in Morbihan, France, with some track in Loire-Inférieure. The first lines opened in 1902 and the system had a total extent of 433 kilometres (269 mi).

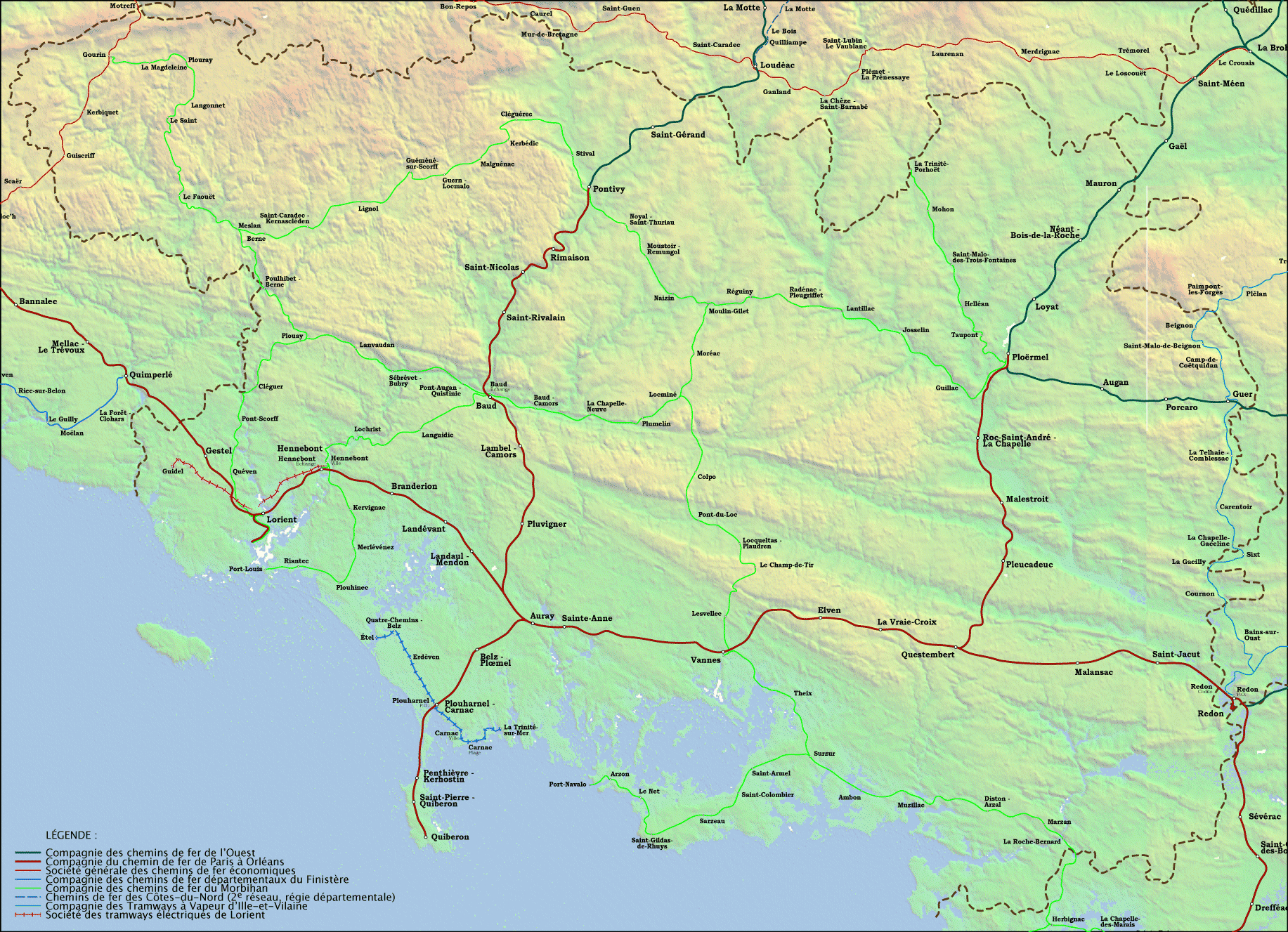
Former railways in Morbihan

== History ==
The CM was a Voie Ferrées d'Interêt Local system. In 1892, the Compagnie des Chemins de Fer du Morbihan was given permission to build a network of metre gauge lines in Morbihan. The first lines opened in 1902, with further lines opening in 1903, 1905, 1906, 1910 and 1921. The first closures were in 1935. Although railcars had been introduced in the 1930s, all rail passenger traffic ceased in 1939, along with another series of line closures. The passenger service was provided by buses from then on. Most of the surviving lines closed in 1947 and the final closures were in 1948.

== Lines ==
The main line was Gourin - Lorient - Meslan - Lochminé - Vannes - La Roche-Bernard.

Branches were from Meslan - Pontivy - Ploermel. Surzur - Port Navalo, Baud - Port Louis, La Roche-Bernard - Herbignac - Piriac-sur-Mer - Guérande, Herbignac - Saint-Nazaire, Pontivy - Moulin Gilet, Pontivy - Guémené-sur-Scorff.

== Rolling stock ==
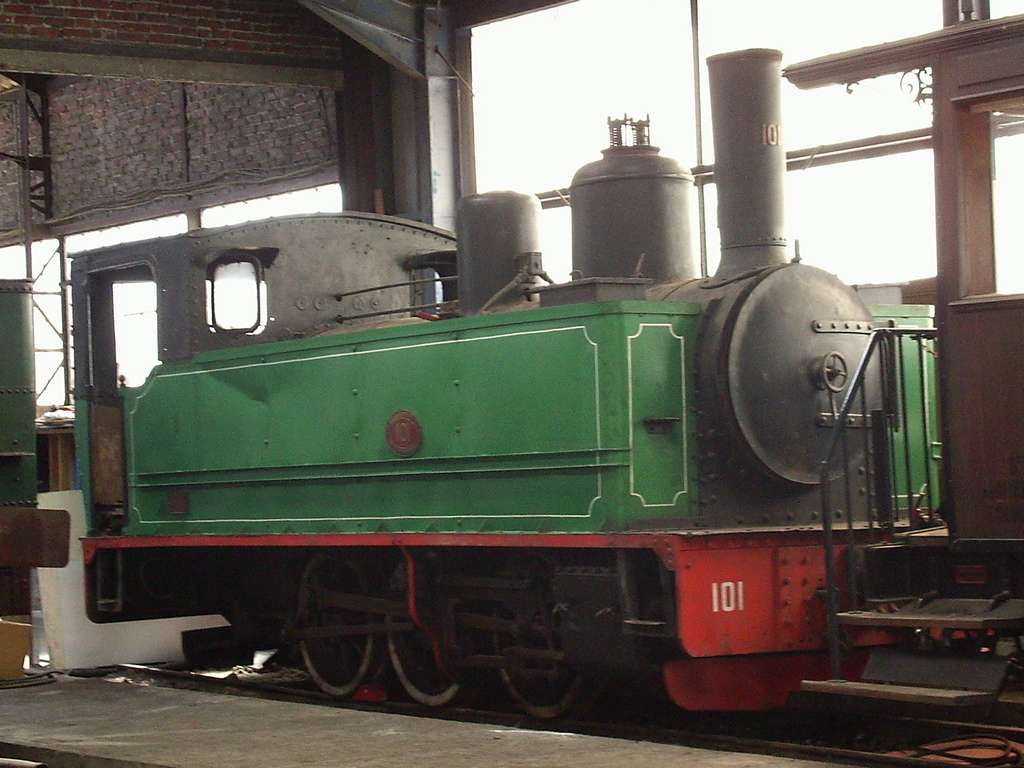
No. 101

=== Steam locomotives ===
- 14 Pingueley 0-6-0T
- 101 Pingueley 0-6-0T works number 165/1905. To Forges de Gueugnon after closure. Preserved on the Chemin de Fer de la Baie de Somme.
- 103 Pingueley 0-6-0T works number 167/1905. To Forges de Gueugnon after closure. Preserved at Tournon.
- 3 Corpet-Louvet 0-6-0T locomotives delivered in 1922. Works numbers 1605-07.

=== Railcars ===
- One petrol railcar is preserved at the Musée des Tramways à Vapeur et des chemins de fer Secondaire français (MTVS).

=== Passenger stock ===
- B153, a bogie carriage, is preserved at the MTVS.

== The line today ==
The station building at Préfailles survives, recently restored.
