= Pendé =

- Commune
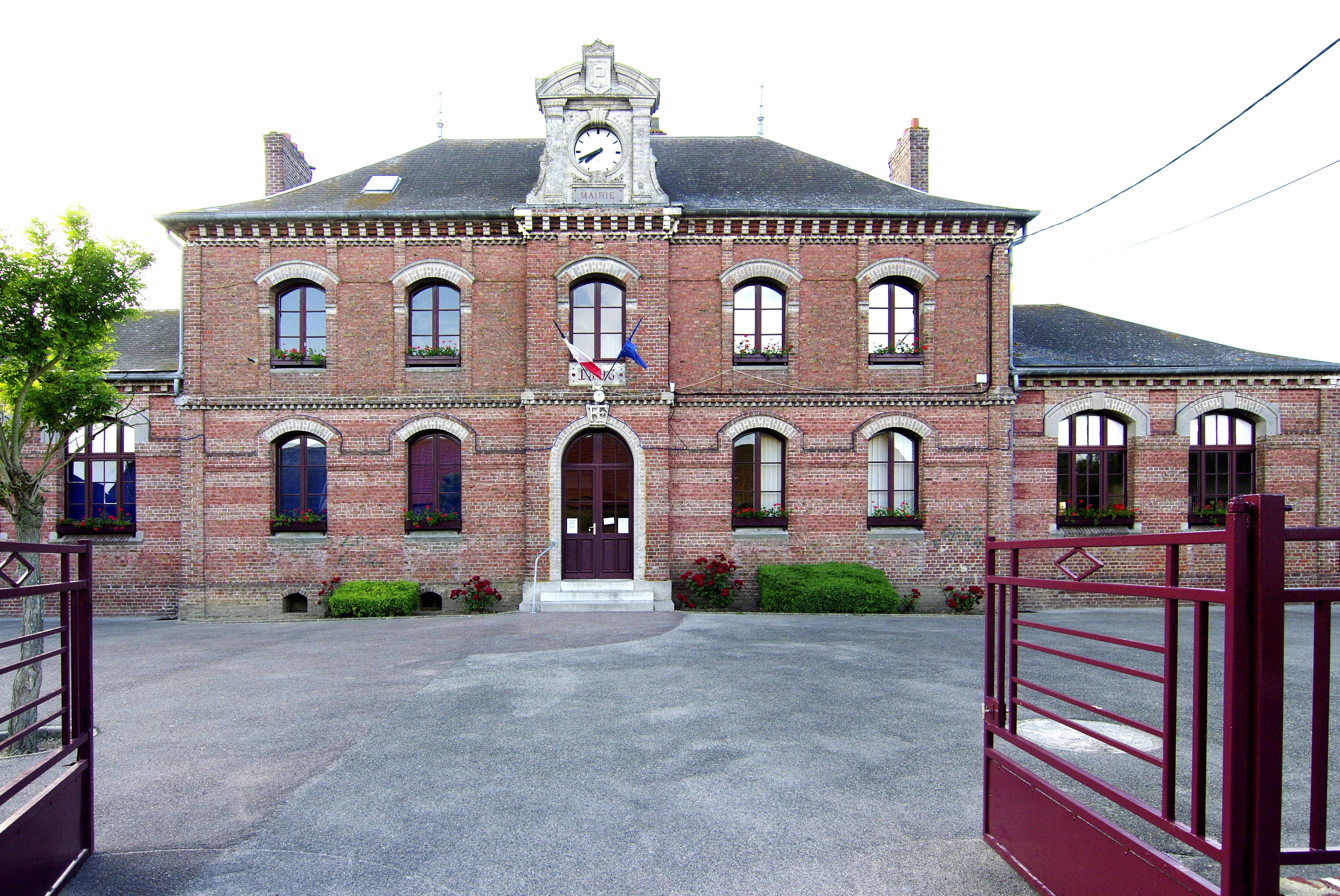
- The town hall in Pendé
- Location of Pendé
- Location within France Location within Hauts-de-France
- Coordinates: 50°09′37″N 1°35′05″E
- Country: France
- Region: Hauts-de-France
- Department: Somme
- Arrondissement: Abbeville
- Canton: Friville-Escarbotin
- Intercommunality: CA Baie de Somme

Government
  - Mayor (2020–2026): Bernard Ducrocq
- Area^{1}: 16.43 km^{2} (6.34 sq mi)
- Elevation: 5 m (16 ft)
- Highest elevation: 56 m (184 ft)
- Lowest elevation: 2 m (6.6 ft)
- Population (2023): 1,025
  - Density: 62.39/km^{2} (161.6/sq mi)
- Time zone: UTC+01:00 (CET)
  - Summer (DST): UTC+02:00 (CEST)
- INSEE/Postal code: 80618 /80230
- ^{1} French Land Register data, which excludes lakes, ponds, glaciers > 1 km^{2} (0.386 sq mi or 247 acres) and river estuaries.

Pendé (French pronunciation: [pɑ̃de]) is a commune in the Somme department in Hauts-de-France in northern France.

== Geography ==
The commune is situated on the D2 road, some 13 miles (21 km) northwest of Abbeville, near the bay of the Somme River.

== Population ==
Historical population
Year	Pop.	±% p.a.
1968	1,099	—
1975	1,052	−0.62%
1982	1,043	−0.12%
1990	1,055	+0.14%
1999	980	−0.82%
2007	1,118	+1.66%
2012	1,118	+0.00%
2017	1,069	−0.89%
2023	1,025	−0.70%
Source: INSEE

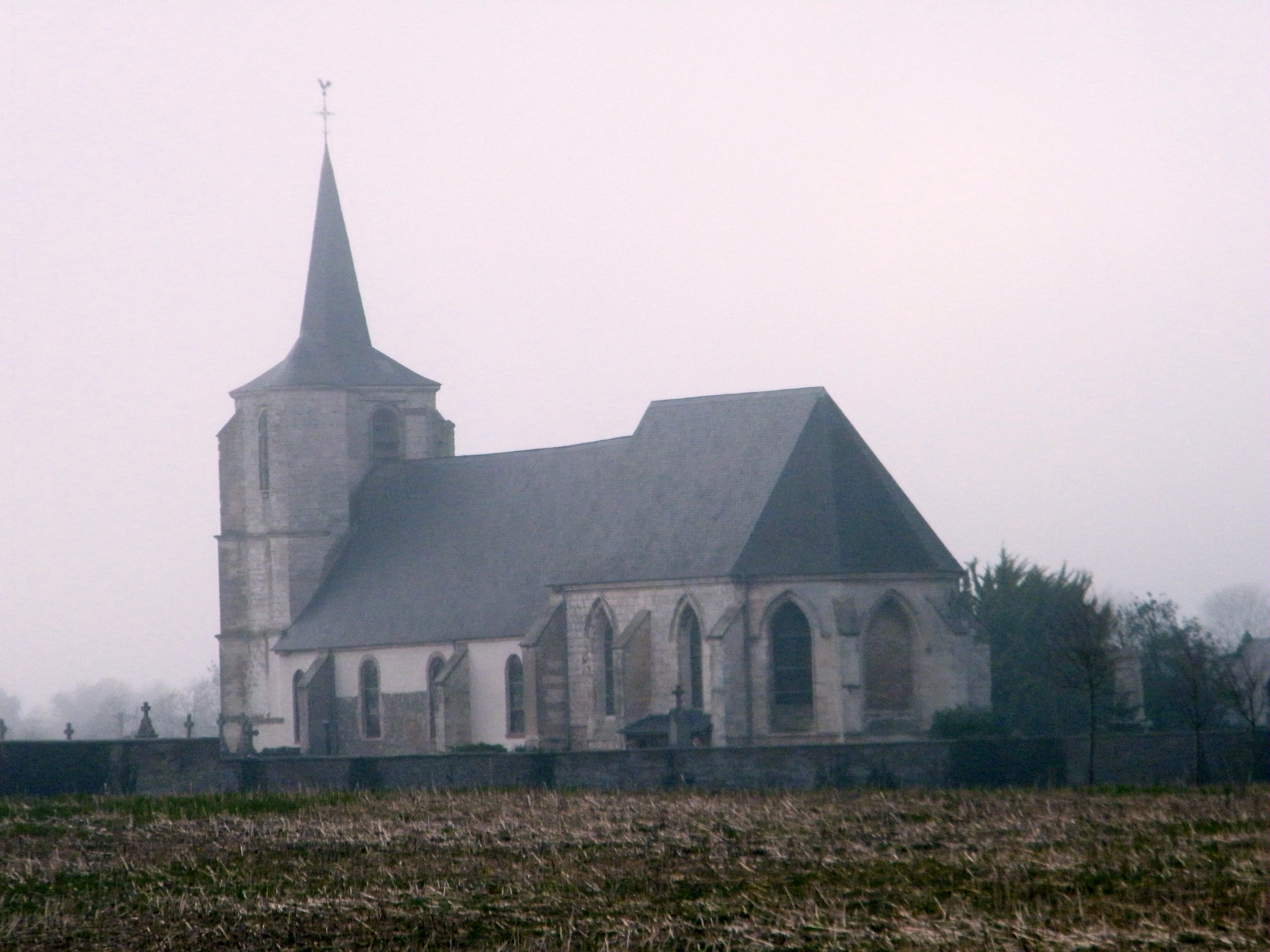
Saint Martin church.

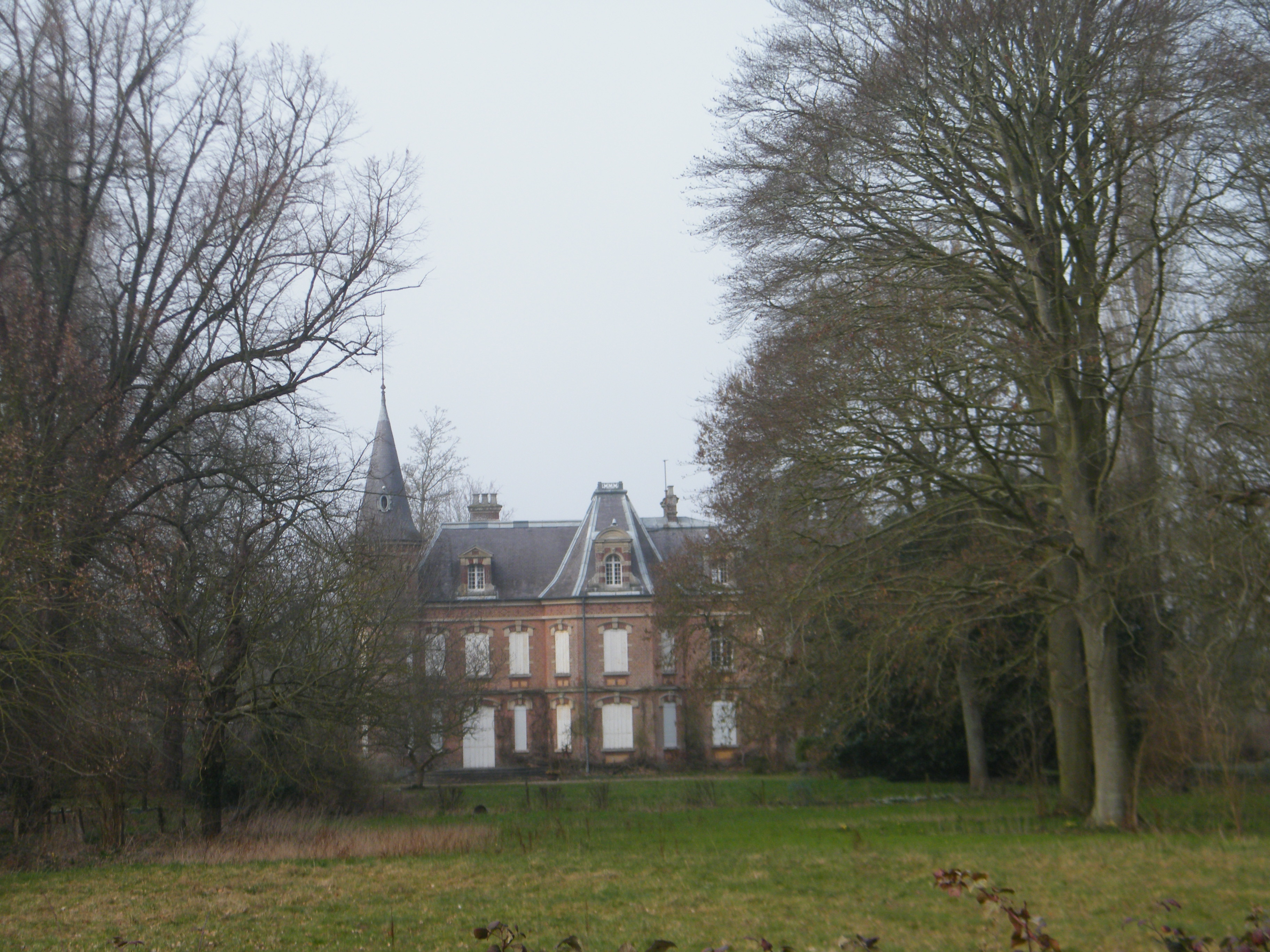
Castle.

== See also ==
- Communes of the Somme department
