= War memorials (Western Somme) =

== Some of the Monuments aux Morts of the Western Somme ==
The Monuments aux Morts of the Western Somme are French war memorials commemorating those who died in World War I. In the Western part of the Somme region, in the area around Abbeville, there are many such memorials and some of these are identified and described below as are the sculptors, marbriers or foundries who worked on them.

Work	Image	Location	Subject, notes and references
Abbeville Monument aux morts	The war memorial at Abbeville by Leclabart	Abbeville Somme	Abbeville is the capital of the Ponthieu region and lies some 20 kilometres from the sea. It is a town dominated by the cathedral-like St Wulfram's Collegiate Church. At Abbeville is one of the major war memorials of the Somme region, this called "Les Patrouillers" ("the night patrol"). The decision to erect a monument by subscription was taken in 1920 and in February 1920 the committee charged with supervising the erection of the monument organised an open competition to which 16 sculptors submitted maquettes including the Parisien sculptor Gauquié. In June 1921 the award for this prestigious war memorial was made to the Amiens sculptor Louis Henri Leclabart who had himself seen service with the 12ème R.I.T. The contract signed between Leclabart and the town was for a sum of 90,000 francs to cover the sculpture and engraving of the names of the dead. The monument was installed where Lesueur's Franco-Prussian War memorial had stood and was inaugurated on 3 June 1923 by Maréchal Foch. There are some palms and laurel leaves in bronze on the pedestal, these dated 1927. The pedestal is made from Euville stone and the sculptured group in Lavoux stone. At the Chauffour limestone quarry, near to Thiescourt in the Oise, are several remarkable carvings and two of these are by Leclabart. Between 1915 and 1917 this old quarry was used as quarters by the French army, including Leclabart's regiment. The Leclabart carvings are one of Joan of Arc and another called "La fontaine".
Airaines Monument aux morts		Airaines Somme	Airaines' memorial features a relief sculpted in 1922 by Albert-Dominique Roze. It shows a dying soldier and the vision that he sees when close to death. Airaines also includes Dreuil-Hamel once a separate commune but joined with Airaines by a decree of 26 September 1972. The war memorial is situated in the Rue Aristide Briand near to the church and was constructed in 1922. The decision to erect a war memorial was made in June 1919 and it was erected in 1922 by Grujon and Galland of Amiens based on the plans of the Amiens architect Lemaire. It was unveiled on 28 May 1922. Albert-Dominique Roze' composition in Lavoux Stone is a bas-relief called "La Vision du soldat morant" and was a fine response to the request to the sculptor that the monument would reflect "la hauteur du sacrifice". Two plaques placed near the monument remember those who died in the Second World War. The final line of the famous Victor Hugo poem "Les Chants du crépuscule" is inscribed on the monument. Ceux qui pieusement sont morts pour la Patrie/Ont droit qu'à leur tombeau la foule vienne et prie/Entre les plus beaux noms leur nom est le plus beau/Toute gloire près d'eux passe et tombe éphémère/Et, comme ferait une mère/La voix d'un peuple entier les berce en leur tombeau.
Arry Monument aux morts	The war memorial at Arry	Arry Somme	The village of Arry has a war memorial featuring a sculpture by Louis-Henri Leclabart which was completed in 1921. A soldier stands stooped in his trench. The monument was erected by the Amiens contractors Grujon and Galland and stands in front of the church.
Ault Monument aux morts		Ault Somme	The monument at Ault which dates from 1921, is set against the wall of the church. It features a soldier standing with head bowed and arms crossed on his rifle. The inauguration took place on 16 October 1921. The cost of the monument was 15,000 francs and it was the work of Paul Landowski.
Beauchamps Monument aux morts		Beauchamps Somme	The Beauchamps war memorial stands in the village's cemetery and was constructed in 1922 by Marbreries Gaudier-Rembaux of Aulnoye in the Nord region. The contract was concluded on 4 March 1922 . The monument involves an infantryman and was entitled "Pro Patria". Inauguration took place on 2 July 1922. This marbrerie had four main editions, two were variations of the gallic cock, another was entitled "Victoire" and the fourth was "Pro Patria".
Canchy Monument aux morts		Canchy Somme	This memorial was completed in 1921 and stands in the Place Charles de Gaulle. Inauguration took place on 20 November 1921. When the monument was unveiled there was apparently some disquiet amongst the people present as the soldier portrayed seemed somewhat on the "portly" side. However such feelings soon subsided and the citizens of Canchy are now most proud of their soldier. The soldier portrayed is a "look-out" man and sits in a trench. His rifle rests against his knee and at his feet are some spare grenades. On the monument the names of the great battles of the war are listed- Marne, Verdun, Somme, Yser. This war memorial was the work of André Abbal (1876–1953).
Cayeux-sur-Mer Monument aux morts		Cayeux-sur-Mer Somme	This memorial which dates from 1921 and is situated at the entrance to the Cayeux-sur-Mer cemetery, was inaugurated on 23 October 1921. It is another featuring a work by Albert-Dominique Roze; two figures stand at either end of a wall on which the names of those remembered are listed, one an infantryman/soldier, the other a marine, the representation of these two arms of the army reflecting the fact that Cayeux-sur-Mer is a coastal town. The monument was carved from Chauvigny stone, cost 35,000 francs and replaced a statue by Léon Parmentier, dedicated to those who died in the Franco-Prussian war. There is another monument in the cemetery which remembers the Allied soldiers who died in the town's military hospital.
Chepy Monument aux morts		Chepy. Somme	At Chepy one has a chance to see some fine work from the Ansart Family. This family of architects were well known in Amiens and Pierre Ansart (1873–1941) was the architect of several war memorial in the region. In one particular monument, that at Chepy, there is some splendid work in mosaic thought to be by Gerard Ansart one of the Ansart Family. Marcel Sueur did the marble work. The monument was inaugurated on 21 May 1922. At the bottom of the monument are the words worked in mosaic –" SOYONS UNIS POUR VIVRE COMME ILS LE FURENT POUR MOURIR". The mosaic features a blue helmet on an oak branch and lists the major battles of the Great War. At the centre a sword wreathed with laurel runs through the names of the dead. Marcel Sueur worked on several monument aux morts apart from that at Chepy. He worked for example with Pierre Ansart on the Rubempre war memorial which dates from 1920 and also that at Cantigny.
Crécy-en-Ponthieu Monument aux morts		Crécy-en-Ponthieu Somme	This memorial is a work by Jules Dulermez, the Abbeville marbrier and was inaugurated on 9 October 1921. It was at Crécy that King Philippe VI of France was defeated by King Edward III of England during the Hundred Years War, this with huge help from the English archers. The English King landed at Saint-Vaast-la-Hougue on 13 July 1346 and the battle at Crécy took place on 26 August of that year. Crécy was merged with the nearby commune of Marcheville in 1973.
Épagne Épagnette Monument aux morts		Épagne Épagnette Somme	Épagne Épagnette's war memorial is most unusual and was conceived by the Parisien architects Bive-Duchemin. It comprises a composition in cement meant to simulate rocks and has a gallic cock perched at the top. One feature of this monument is that it shows where each man remembered was killed. Inauguration took place on 12 November 1922.
Fort Mahon Plage Monument aux morts	Part of the Fort Mahon Plage war memorial	Fort Mahon Plage Somme	Fort Mahon Plage is a popular seaside resort and it was on 22 February 1930 that the decision was taken to erect the war memorial in the Place des Sapins. The monument features two fine bas-reliefs on white marble which were the work of the sculptor Paul Ganuchaud. These bas-reliefs include depictions of three soldiers grouped around a machine gun and two others carrying a wounded comrade whilst elsewhere families with children and possessions are depicted leaving the town and passing through a countryside which is in ruins. Inauguration took place on 25 June 1933. The war memorial is surrounded by a wooden barrier in the shape of the croix de guerre. The reliefs have been much eroded by years of wind and rain and much of the detail is hard to make out.
Friville-Escarbotin Monument aux morts		Friville-Escarbotin Somme	Friville-Escarbotin's memorial dates from 1924 and is one of Albert-Dominique Roze's more thoughtful compositions. The monument covers the three communities of Friville, Escarbotin and Belloy. It was inaugurated on 3 August 1924 and stands in a square on the outskirts of the village. In the composition there is a widow morning a dead soldier balanced against a young man standing over agricultural and industrial tools and representing the young generation who will be charged with rebuilding France; the rising sun gives a sense of renewal. It was erected on land in front of the then Friville railway station.
Gamaches Monument aux morts	Gamaches	Gamaches Somme	At Gamaches there are two war memorials. One is in the Place du Marché and the second in the local cemetery. Both were erected by Dovergne-Seclet a builder and marbrier from Gamaches. Total cost was 25,970 francs of which 20,393 francs related to the monument in the Place du Marché. Inauguration took place on 21 August 1921. The main monument consists of a pyramid of Breton granite with a statue at the top. This is a statue of a soldier, the work entitled "le poilu en plein combat défendant le drapeau ". One would have taken this as being from the catalogue of Marbreries Générales Gourdon but it seems that the marbrier Gaudier-Rembaux of Aulnoye presented himself in March 1922 to the neighbouring village of Beauchamps as the author of the Gamaches work so there is a little confusion.
Le Crotoy Monument aux morts	The war memorial at Le Crotoy	Le Crotoy Somme	At Le Crotoy there are three war memorials in what is only a small town. One is to be found in the town centre, the second by the cemetery and the third in nearby St Firmin. The first two monuments are from Marbreries Générales Gourdon and are both dated 1921. One is a bronze called "Poilu et Marin Combattant" and the second in white stone is called "Poilu mourant en défendant son drapeau". The monument in St Firmin is a work of the marbrier Dulermez of Abbeville and dates from 1920. The contract with Gourdon was for 21,000 francs. The St Firmin monument cost 6,500 francs. It was in Le Crotoy that Joan of Arc was imprisoned in 1430 before being taken to Rouen via Saint-Valery-sur-Somme and it was in this commune that Jules Verne wrote "20,000 Leagues under the sea."
Long Monument aux morts		Long Somme	Long's war memorial features a bronze cast by the foundry Fonderies Montagutelli Frères of Paris. This was the work of the sculptor Georges Chauvel (1886–1962). It is entitled "La France couronnant un soldat blessé " and shows a wounded soldier receiving a crown of laurels from a female figure representing France. On the pedestal itself there is a bas-relief this showing the mobilisation of Long and featuring the then mayor of Long and the men of Long killed in the war all responding to the call to mobilise.
Longpré-les-Corps-Saints Monument aux morts	The poilu on the war memorial at Longpré-les-Corps-Saints	Longpré-les-Corps-Saints Somme	Longpré-les-Corps-Saints derives its name from the relics which the church founder Aléaume de Fontaine had sent from Constantinople during the Crusades. There was already a monument in this village called "des Mobiles de 1870" erected in memory of the Franco-Prussian war and after the First World War a decision was taken to add a Gallic cock and a marble plaque with the names of the 42 men of the village killed in that war. The monument was inaugurated 2 April 1922 but only after some more ambitious plans to add reliefs to the monument and a plaque was added by Souvenir français, dated 28 December 1893 in honour of the citizens of Longpré-les-Corps-Saints killed on 28 December 1870. The relief was the work of Auguste Carvin and features a soldier resting on his rifle with laurel and a cross at his feet. Carvin's relief is very worn after long exposure to the elements.
Machiel Monument aux morts		Machiel Somme	In this village the war memorial is a collaboration between Albert Roze and Jules Dulermez and is a representation of a soldier. The monument was inaugurated on 11 September 1921.
Mers-les-Bains Monument aux morts	The war memorial at Mers-les-Bains	Mers-les-Bains Somme	Mers-les-Bains' war memorial is another work by Emmanuel Fontaine. It stands in the Square Henri Barbusse and was inaugurated on 17 September 1922. In 1994 a plaque was added with photographs of those resistance fighters who lost their lives during the Second World War. One feature of the Mers-Les-Bains war memorial, a feature shared with the monuments at Pont Noyelle, Terremesnil, and St Sauveur, was the use of defused artillery shells as part of the railing around the monument. The sculpture is in Chauvigny and Lorraine stone. It features a soldier one of whose feet crushes the head of a slain German Imperial eagle. The carving of the eagle has been much eroded by the elements so that the significance of Fontaine's composition is rather diminished.
Rue Monument aux morts	Detail from the war memorial at Rue	Rue Somme	Rue's war memorial has a relief by Emmanuel Fontaine which features a seated soldier who holds a flag and turns towards an angel who presents him with a branch of laurel. The monument dates from 1921 and was inaugurated on 18 September 1921. Rue is the capital of the area known as the "Marquenterre", and has a magnificent 15th century Belfry ( a UNESCO site), the Chapelle du Saint Esprit (an example of the "flamboyant" gothic style) and a museum dedicated to the Caudron brothers, pioneers of aviation (located in the Tourist Office.)
Saint-Quentin-en–Tourmont Monument aux morts/Marbreries Générales Gourdon	The war memorial at St Quentin en Tourmont	Saint-Quentin-en-Tourmont, Somme	Saint-Quentin-en–Tourmont's memorial features a work by Marbreries Générales Gourdon who were based in Paris with Urbain Gourdon as a director. They produced a wide range of sculptural works that were suitable for use on war memorials although the sculptors of the works were rarely identified. They issued a catalogue covering their range of products. This range included the following editions:-: "Ange porteur de lauriers"; "Buste de grenadier"; "Coq"; "France remettant une couronne de lauriers"; "Mèdaillon"; "Poilu combatant"; "Poilu mourant en défendant le drapeau"; "Pro Patria"; "Victoire"; "Victoire soutenant un poilu mourant"; In the Somme region there are other commercial enterprises who produced and marketed, as editions available "on demand", works suitable for war memorial such as Jacomet, Val d’Osne, and Société Antoine Durenne of Somerville in the Haut-Marne.
Saint-Quentin-en-Tourmont Monument aux morts	The war memorial at St Quentin-en-Tourmont	Saint-Quentin-en-Tourmont Somme	The war memorial in this village stands outside the church of Saint-Quentin. The monument, erected between 1920 and 1921, features an allegory of the French Republic wearing a phrygien bonnet and draped in the national flag. This commune lost 24 from a population of 440 and 700 francs was envisaged as the amount that would be needed for the monument but in the end it cost 4,061 francs.
Saint-Riquier Monument aux morts	The war memorial at St Riquier by Emmanuel Fontaine	St-Riquier Somme	Saint-Riquier's war memorial features sculptural work by Emmanuel Fontaine and was inaugurated on 10 October 1920. The same monument was erected at Terramesnil near Doullens – a Gallic cock sits triumphantly atop a garlanded pedestal.Saint-Riquier is an ancient fortified town and has an imposing Gothic Abbey, cathedral like in size.
Saint-Valery-sur-Somme Monument aux morts		Saint-Valery-sur-Somme Somme	At Saint-Valery-sur-Somme there is another war memorial with sculptural work by Albert-Dominique Roze, this completed in 1922, and another collaboration with Jules Dulermez. The monument faces the local cemetery, a site chosen in 1921 by the municipal council. A contract was signed with Roze in August 1922 for the sum of 45,000 francs. The monument is worked in Chauvigny stone and the monument was inaugurated on 22 October 1922. It was from Saint-Valery-sur-Somme that William the Conqueror set out to invade England in 1066. The port was also used in the First World War as one of the supply routes for the front-line.
Quend Monument aux morts		Quend Somme	Quend's war memorial is another collaboration between Roze and Dulermez this one featuring a standing soldier. This monument stands in front of the church and was worked from Chauvigny stone. The inauguration took place on 28 November 1920. On the pedestal supporting the figure of the soldier there is a relief featuring the Croix de Guerre.
Vron Monument aux morts	The Poilu on the Vron war memorial	Vron Somme	Vron's war memorial is another with work by Emmanuel Fontaine. It features a poilu (French soldier) at whose feet lies a German helmet.

== Further images ==
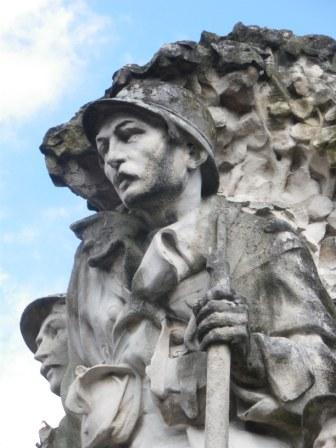
Detail from Leclabart's war memorial in Abbeville

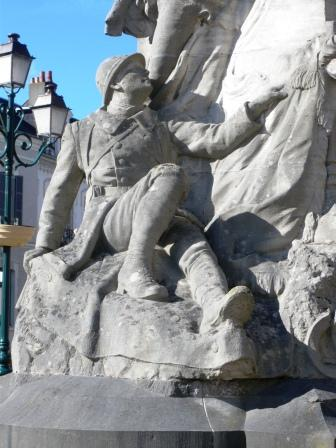
Detail from the war memorial at Rue

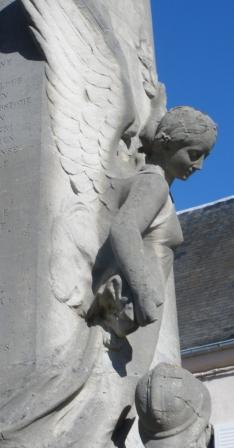
Detail from the war memorial at Rue

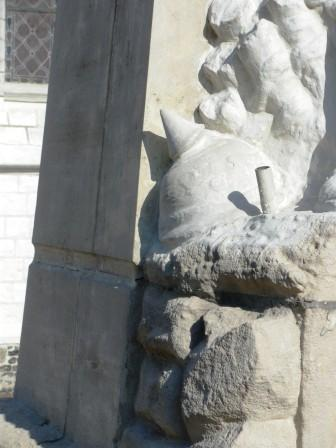
The German helmet on the Vron war memorial

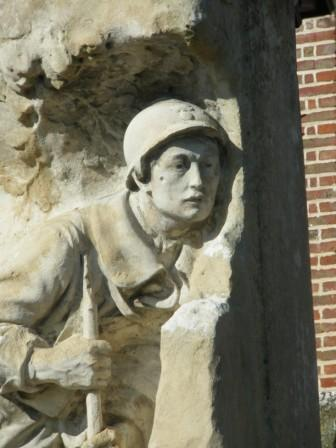
Another view of the Arry war memorial

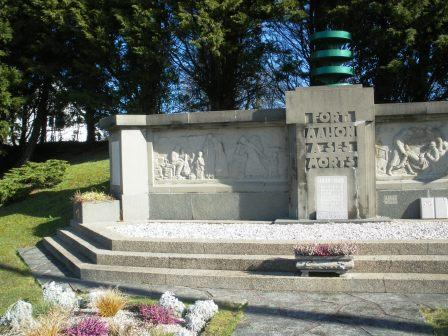
View of war memorial at Fort Mahon Plage

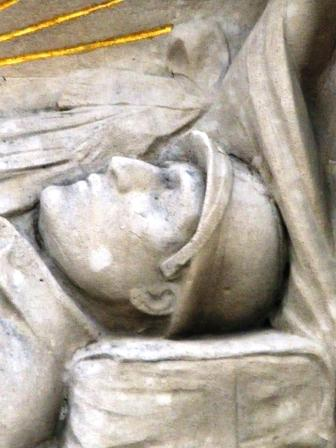
Part of the war memorial at Friville Escarbotin

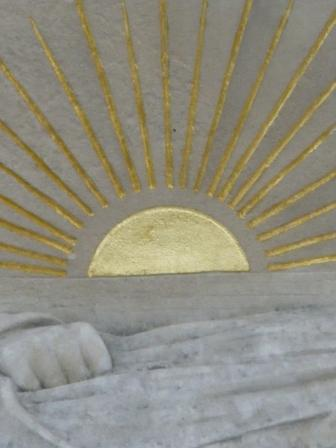
Part of the war memorial at Friville Escarbotin

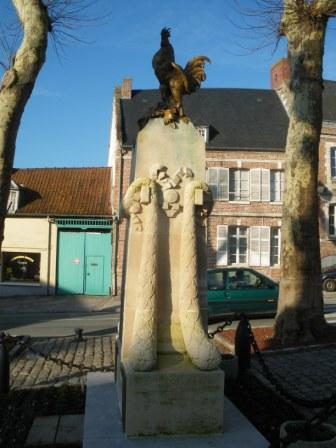
The garlanded war memorial at St Riquier

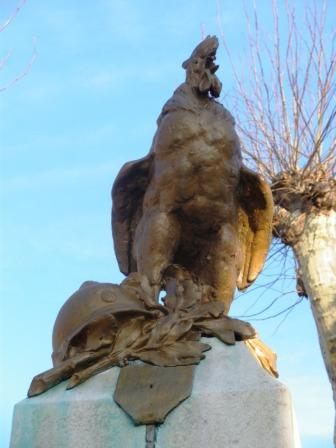
The war memorial at St Riquier

== See also ==
- World War I memorials
- War memorials (Aisne)
- War memorials (Oise)
- War memorials (Eastern Somme)
