= Château du Broutel =

18th-century château in Hauts-de-France, France

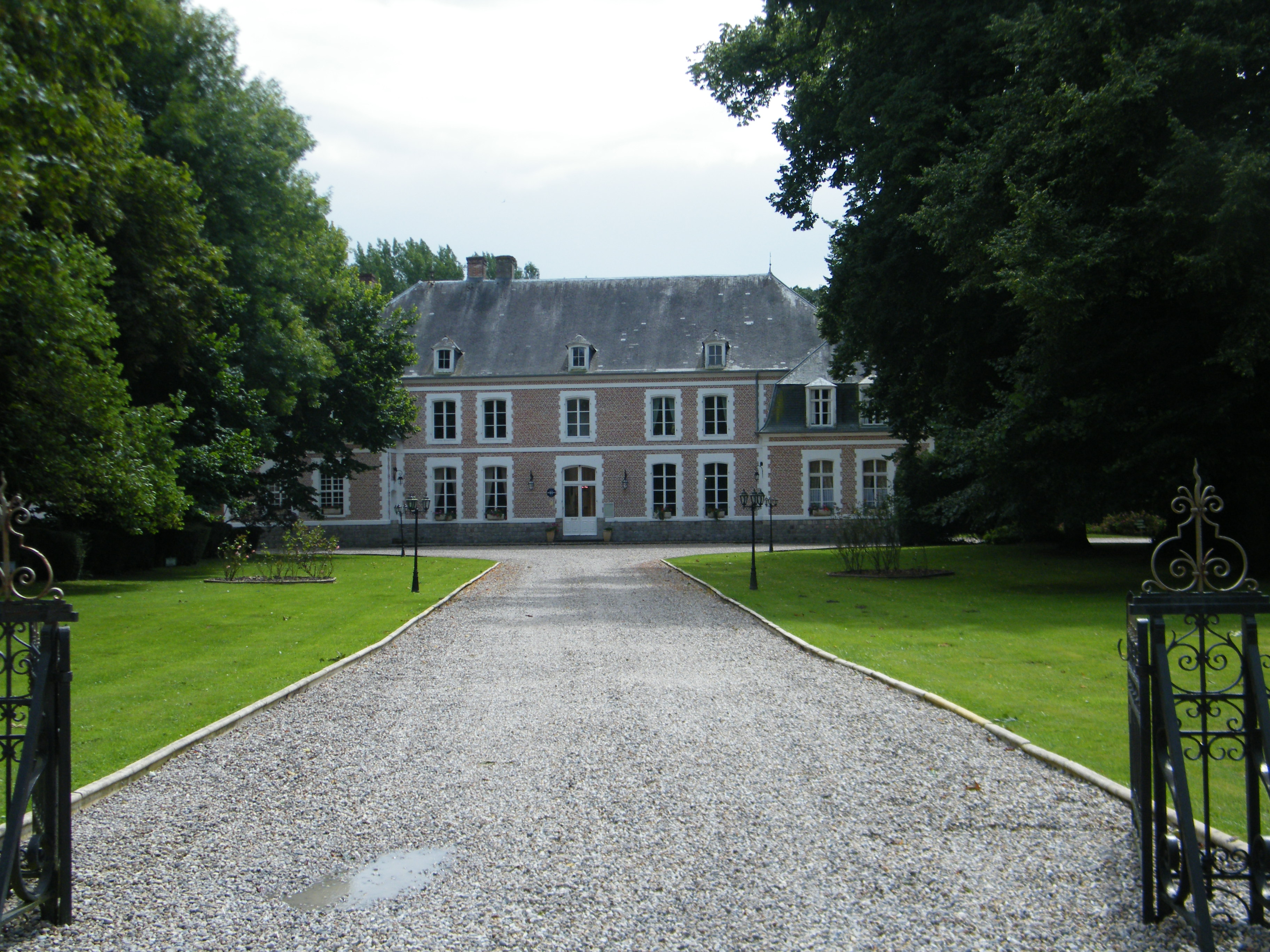

- Location within France

General information
- Architectural style: French Medieval
- Coordinates: 50.2649°N 1.6775°E
- Completed: 1445

The Château du Broutel is an 18th-century château situated in Rue, Hauts-de-France, in northern France. Originally built as the private residence for Jean-Baptiste Loisel Le Gaucher, it is currently owned by Globebrow Ltd and is a multi-activity centre for British children at KS2, 3 and 4.

== Château ==
The château is an example of 18th-century architecture. At the back of the château, much of the original brickwork remains intact and the stonemason's insignia can be seen on the south side of the château. The exterior of the château has been listed as a monument historique by the French Ministry of Culture since 1969. The back patio, roof, tree-lined driveway and mural paintings are also protected under the same listed status.

== History ==
Château du Broutel dates back to 1714 and is situated in approximately 40 acres (160,000 m^{2}). It was built by Jean-Baptiste Loisel Le Gaucher, one of the senior cavalry officers for Louis XIV. The land on which the Château was built was in the Loisel Le Gaucher family before the building was constructed. It is believed that the Château sustained damage during the French Revolution. This damage was repaired in the first decades of the 19th Century. On the back of the Château, one can see the date 1824 in iron numbers. This is the year in which Jean-Baptiste's son, Jean-Nicolas Loisel Le Gaucher, died.

The main Château building is built from stone, brick and slate. The original materials were taken from the Citadel of Rue after it was destroyed in 1668. The paintings and murals which decorate most of the rooms are painted in the style of Horace Vernet, a French artist whose renown came from painting military battles. Throughout the building, there are many large paintings which have been listed by the French government as official historical monument since 1969. Also listed is the roof and exterior of the Château as well as the tree-lined driveway and the Louis XV bedroom.

In 1901, the Château was sold by Monsieur Charles du Broutel to the Le Marquis de Longvillers (the cousin of Jean-Baptiste Loisel le Gaucheur du Broutel) whose house had been destroyed in a fire. Monsieur Charles du Broutel was the only direct bloodline member of the Broutel family to survive the fire. His reasons for selling the Château were personal. He claimed that he was unable to bear the memories that the Château held of his deceased relatives. The Longvillers family resorted many of the paintings in the Château.

In the 1980s, the Château was again sold to be the private country residence of Lionel Leroy, who was the former managing director and son of the founder of the French DIY chain Leroy Merlin. It was Monsieur Leroy who restored the Château to its original glory by carrying out some vital repair work. Monsieur Leroy also converted the main Château building from private use to a hotel during the 1990s and began renovations to the impressive 18th-century stable block, now named 'Ecurie'. The Château was sold to a British company, Globebrow Ltd at the end of the 20th century. Further renovations to the stable block and other outbuildings have been completed more recently.

=== World War I ===
The department in which the Château is situated, the Somme, was also the location of some of the most brutal battles of the First World War. Albert (one of the key locations in the Battle of the Somme is located less than 100 km from the Château.

For the first month of the War in France, Rue was unaffected by the fighting but by the end of August, the German advance was posing more if a threat. By the end of August the Germans had reached Amiens and shells could be heard exploding to the north of Rue. On 2 October 1914, the first British troops (under the command of General Horrace Smith-Dorrien) arrived in Rue. There were around 1000 British troops to begin with, including the London Scottish Regiment. The first troops in Rue moved through very quickly, usually staying for only a day or so. Those that did stay in the town were stationed in a temporary military camp which had been set up on the Château driveway- Le Camp du Marais. By 1915, troop movements had intensified significantly. At times, more than 200 trains per day passed through, most of them taking troops towards the north. With the movement of troops came reports from the Western Front. In December 1915, the town learnt of the death of Gaston Caudron.

In 1916, Rue was subject to some ariel bombardments although the damage that they inflicted was limited in comparison to the attacks that would come in 1918. The military presence in the town came as a blessing and a curse. The security which the allied troops was valued but there was not enough food and supplies to support the civilians as well as the military. This situation was at its worst in 1917.

On 24 November 1916, around 1000 Marine infantry soldiers arrived in Rue. They had been ordered on a months rest and recovery by King George V to reward their efforts in the Battle of the Somme. Their General stayed in the new Broutel Château in the centre of Rue (Le Château de Rue).

Winter 1918 saw another intensification in the fighting but there were new targets for the German offensive: Paris and Amiens. This brought the fighting closer to Rue. The town was victim to numerous ariel bombardments. The damage included the railway line, a key link between Paris and Calais. To combat the effects of the bombing, Chinese workers near Noyelles-sur-Mer built a secondary railway line.

As the war drew to a close, the majority of the troops who passed through Rue were either resting, recovering or returning home. There were an estimated 15.000 soldiers and they stayed in the Camp du Marais. Notably, the 52nd (Lowland) Infantry Division visited, having fought in Egypt and Palestine.

=== World War II ===
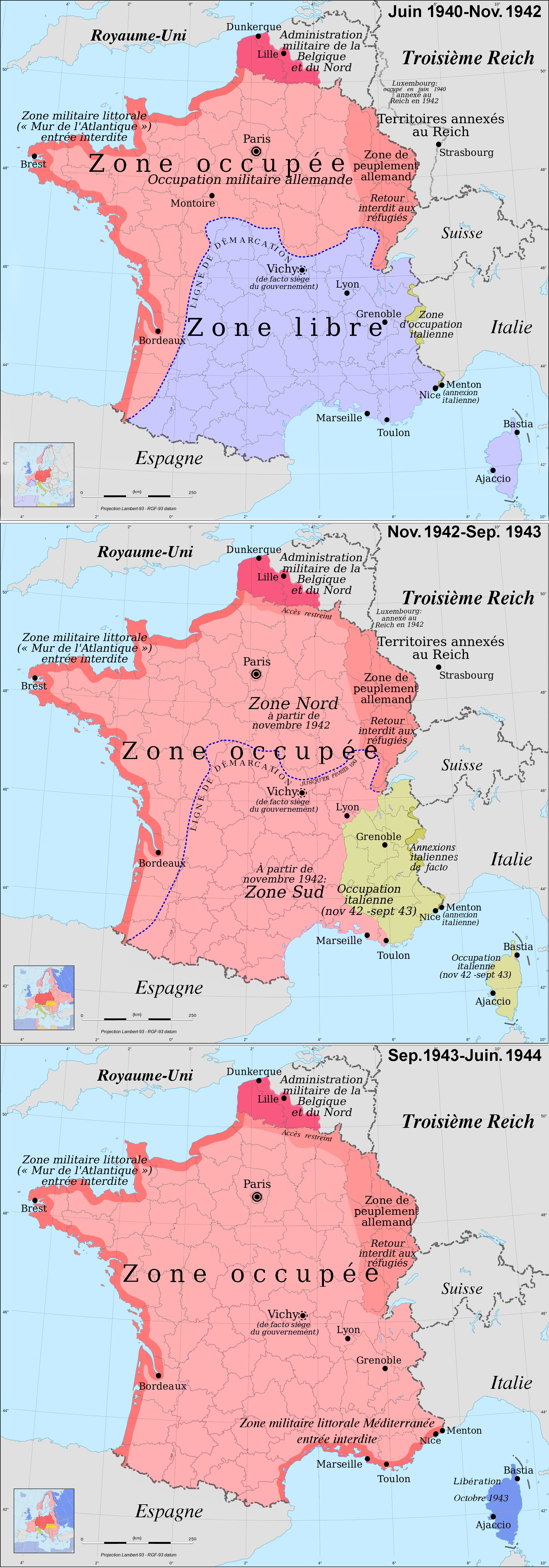
German (pink) and Italian (green) occupation zones of France: the zone occupée, the zone libre, the zone interdite, the Military Administration in Belgium and Northern France, and annexed Alsace-Lorraine.

In response to Germany's re-armament programme, the French had begun moving troops towards the North and East. During late 1938 and 1939, Rue was home to numerous French troops including the 45th and 51st French Infantry as well as elements of the 124th. On 10 May 1940, over the wireless, it was announced that German troops had made it into France. Immediately, the 45th and 124th regiments headed towards the north-east of France. Within 10 days, the German pincer movement, combined with the ill-prepared French resistance and British Expeditionary Force, trapped the Allied troops in Northern France. The arrival of German tanks in Amiens marked the point where the Allied forces were no longer to sustain an effective counter-offensive. It was the entrapment of the allied troop that led to Operation Dynamo, the evacuation of British and French troops from Dunkirk.

As the Germans advanced along the Somme throughout May and June 1940, more and more tanks, cannons and munitions passed through Rue. One resident of Rue remembered how the sky towards Abbeville being red. The town was literally burning. Seeing Stukas or Messerschmitts (German fighter aeroplanes) in the skies over Rue was a common sight. By 22 May 1940, the German control of Northern France was becoming more visible. Barbed wire was appearing along roads around Rue and military outposts had been established. In Rue, the German Commander implemented military rule. Identity cards were distributed and a curfew was set at 2100h. Identity cards (called Ausweis) had to be collected Montreuil. These gave permission to be in what was called the ‘Red Zone’ - the area between the northern coast of France and the Somme. In June 1940, inhabitants of Rue were instructed to paint over any windows on the roofs of factories so that they could not be seen from the air.

The Château du Broutel was occupied by the Nazis. Officers stayed in the bedrooms while the non-commissioned officers slept in the corridors and the landing. The Longvilliers family, who owned the Château during the war, were forced to live in one bedroom. La Marquise de Longvilliers, the wife of the Château's proprietor (Le Marquis de Longvillers) during the war had a reputation for standing up to the German occupiers. When the German troops arrived at Château du Broutel, they hammered nails into the walls to create their own cloakroom. Mme. Longvillers was more than displeased. She was a German speaker who was a stronger supporter of Charles De Gaulle's (French General and War hero) resistance army. She found the German General in the region and demanded that the nails be removed. The General proceeded to order the removal of the nails from the wall.

During the summer of 1940, the German high command was putting Operation Sea Lion, the plan to invade Great Britain, into action. Aerial battles were fought over the Channel as the Luftwaffe fought for superiority in the air. Boulogne, Calais and many other areas along the north-east coast were subject to heavy bombardments. Huge artillery cannons, including the 420mm Big Bertha were used along the north coast before being moved to Sevastopol, where the German army required them in their struggle to hold the Eastern Front (the war against Russia). Throughout the summer, heavy artillery and munitions passed through Rue.

By summer 1941, the number of German troops in Rue was noticeably less. May had been moved eastwards and those that remained were older and were more focused on rest and recovery. The British had started inflicting damage onto German equipment. According to residents, the train that had brought German soldiers to Rue been peppered with bullets by the RAF and looked like a ‘sieve’. The same account also tells of a tragedy inflicted on the British in Canteraine, just outside Rue. A German anti-aircraft gun which was located in a quarry called the ‘Limestone Oven’ managed to shoot down a British bomber. The crew fell from the plane. They managed to pull their parachutes and landed in a group of ponds to the north of Rue. However, they were badly wounded. They had been shot multiple times and became tangled in their parachute cords which eventually caused them to drown.

During the winter months of late 1941 and early 1942, German soldiers began returning to Rue from the Eastern Front. Their mood was noticeably different. Frozen and exhausted, it was clear that the tides of the war had changed.

The morning of 6 June 1944 was distinctly different to any other. The German soldiers in Rue were visibly nervous. Word was everywhere: ‘The Tommies had landed in Normandy’.

On the morning of 4 September 1944, Polish troops, along with British and Canadian forces, liberated Rue. The Americans continued past Rue to liberate Bernay, Vron and Montreuil.

== Current use ==
The Château is used as a residential multi-activity centre for British children at KS2, 3 and 4. It is also known as Château Aventure. Activities which are available at the Château include, Canoeing, Kayaking, Rock Climbing, Abseiling, Shooting, Archery and Low Ropes. The Château continues as a 3-Star hotel for two weeks per year.
