= Arry, Somme =

Arry
- Commune
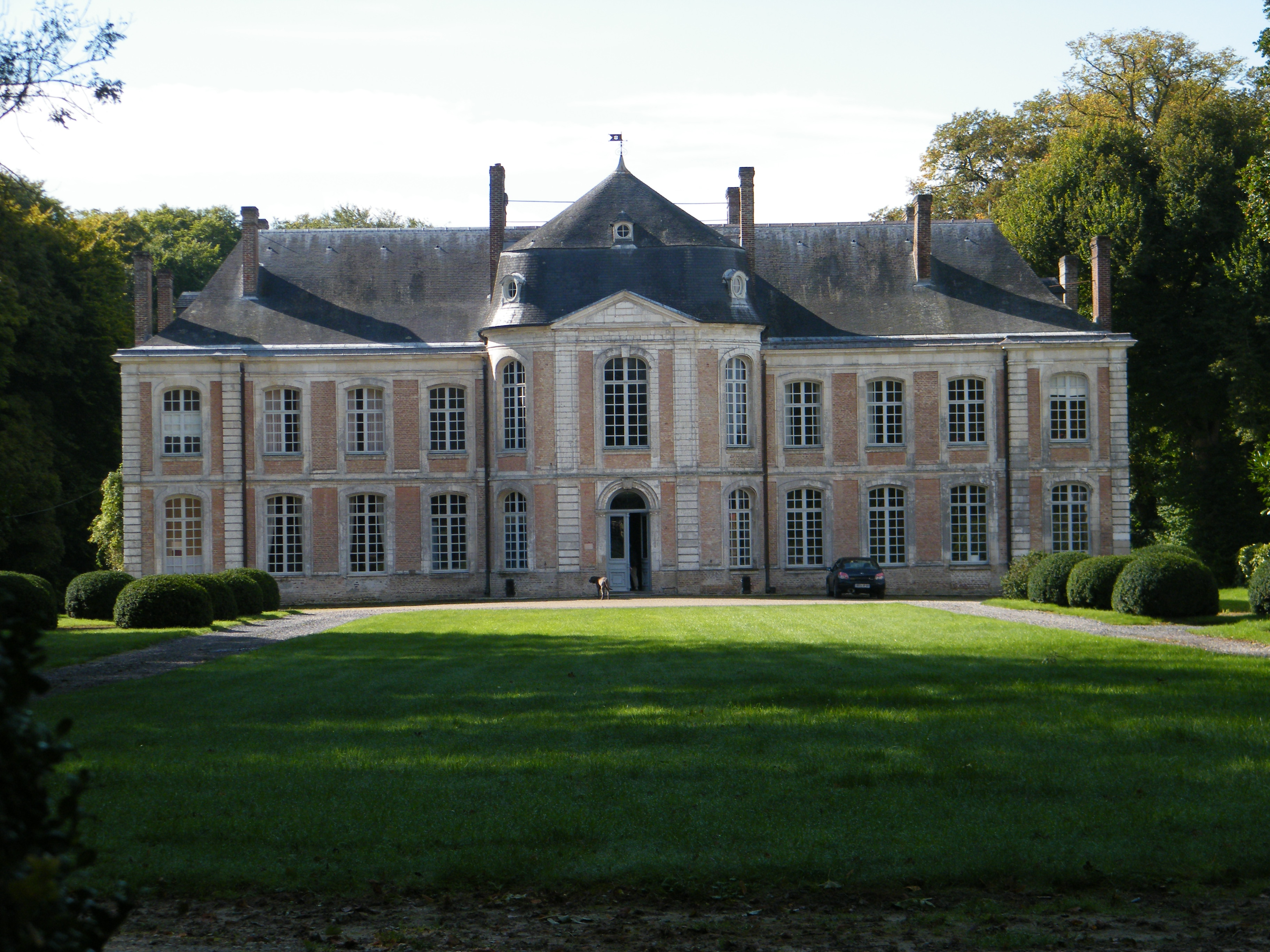
- The castle in Arry.
- Location of Arry
- Location within France Location within Hauts-de-France
- Coordinates: 50°16′44″N 1°43′17″E
- Country: France
- Region: Hauts-de-France
- Department: Somme
- Arrondissement: Abbeville
- Canton: Rue
- Intercommunality: CC Ponthieu-Marquenterre

Government
  - Mayor (2020–2026): Thibault Bourgois
- Area^{1}: 7.34 km^{2} (2.83 sq mi)
- Elevation: 16 m (52 ft)
- Highest elevation: 39 m (128 ft)
- Lowest elevation: 2 m (6.6 ft)
- Population (2023): 212
  - Density: 28.9/km^{2} (74.8/sq mi)
- Time zone: UTC+01:00 (CET)
  - Summer (DST): UTC+02:00 (CEST)
- INSEE/Postal code: 80030 /80120
- ^{1} French Land Register data, which excludes lakes, ponds, glaciers > 1 km^{2} (0.386 sq mi or 247 acres) and river estuaries.

Arry (French pronunciation: [aʁi]) is a commune in the Somme department in Hauts-de-France in northern France.

== Geography ==
The commune is situated about 1 kilometre from the A16 autoroute, on the D938 road to Rue.

== Population ==
Historical population
Year	Pop.	±% p.a.
1968	182	—
1975	191	+0.69%
1982	176	−1.16%
1990	158	−1.34%
1999	164	+0.41%
2007	188	+1.72%
2012	196	+0.84%
2017	212	+1.58%
2023	212	+0.00%
Source: INSEE

== Monument aux morts ==
The monument aux morts in this commune features a sculpture by Louis-Henri Leclabart. A montage of photographs of this monument aux morts, which stands in front of the church, is shown below.

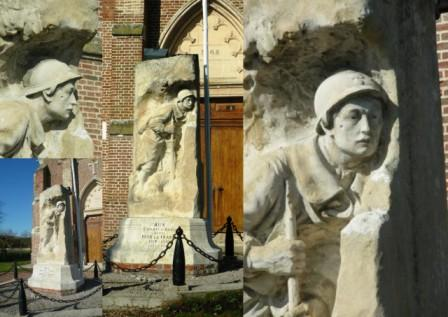
The Arry monument aux morts.

== See also ==
- Communes of the Somme department
- War memorials (Western Somme)
