= Machiel =

- Commune
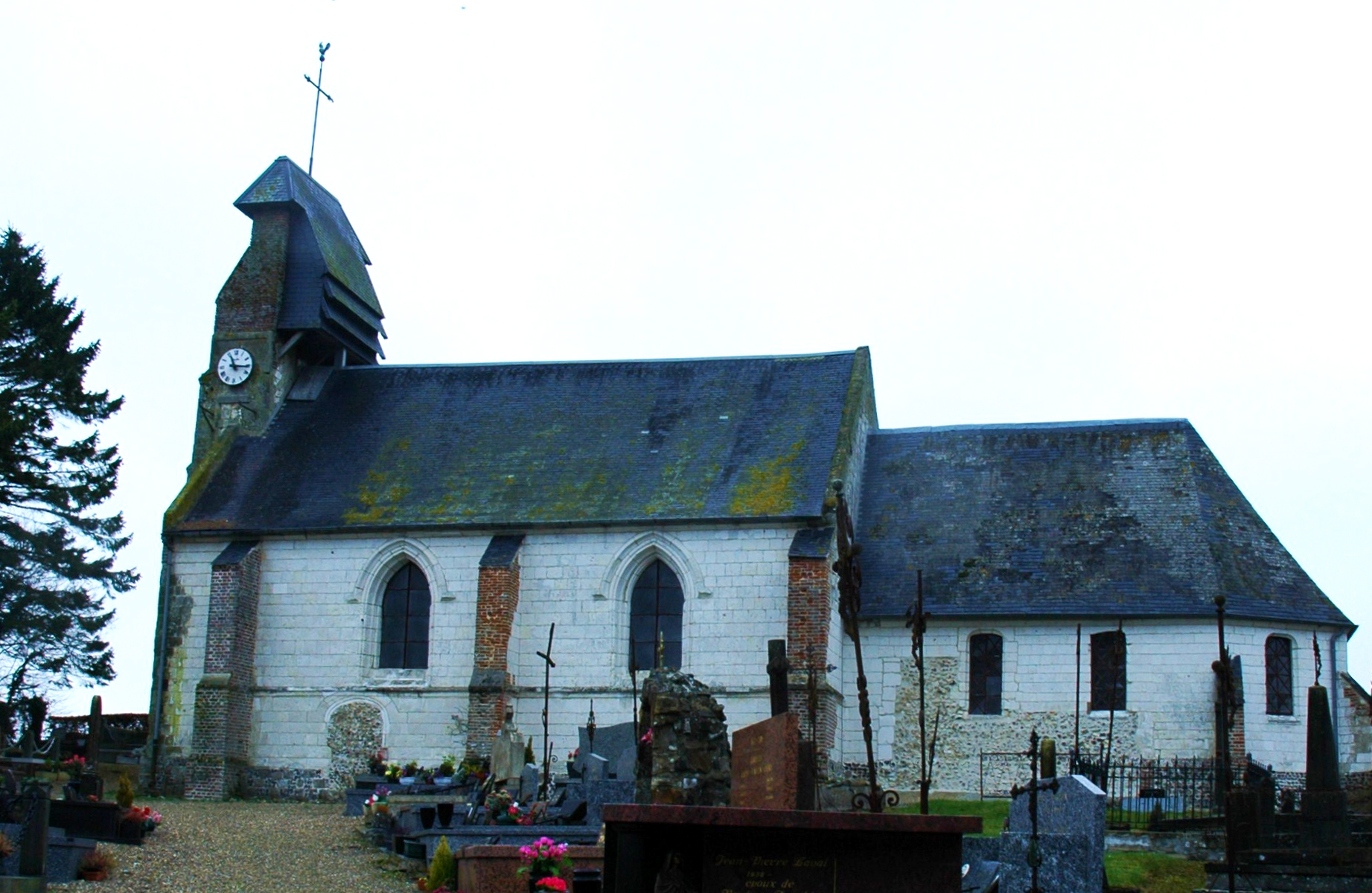
- The church in Machiel
- Location of Machiel
- Location within France Location within Hauts-de-France
- Coordinates: 50°16′01″N 1°49′59″E
- Country: France
- Region: Hauts-de-France
- Department: Somme
- Arrondissement: Abbeville
- Canton: Rue
- Intercommunality: Ponthieu-Marquenterre

Government
  - Mayor (2020–2026): Olivier Pley
- Area^{1}: 6.61 km^{2} (2.55 sq mi)
- Elevation: 24 m (79 ft)
- Highest elevation: 76 m (249 ft)
- Lowest elevation: 17 m (56 ft)
- Population (2023): 151
  - Density: 22.8/km^{2} (59.2/sq mi)
- Time zone: UTC+01:00 (CET)
  - Summer (DST): UTC+02:00 (CEST)
- INSEE/Postal code: 80496 /80150
- ^{1} French Land Register data, which excludes lakes, ponds, glaciers > 1 km^{2} (0.386 sq mi or 247 acres) and river estuaries.

Machiel is a commune in the Somme department in Hauts-de-France in northern France.

== Geography ==
Machiel is situated on the D938 road, some 10 miles (16 km) north of Abbeville, in the forest of Crécy.

== Population ==
Historical population
Year	Pop.	±% p.a.
1968	175	—
1975	173	−0.16%
1982	169	−0.33%
1990	177	+0.58%
1999	171	−0.38%
2007	160	−0.83%
2012	177	+2.04%
2017	156	−2.49%
2023	151	−0.54%
Source: INSEE

== Monument aux morts ==
The Machiel monument aux morts features a sculpture by Albert-Dominique Roze. A montage of photographs of this monument aux morts is shown below.

== See also ==
- Communes of the Somme department
- War memorials (Western Somme)
