= Airaines =

Commune in Hauts-de-France, France

- Commune
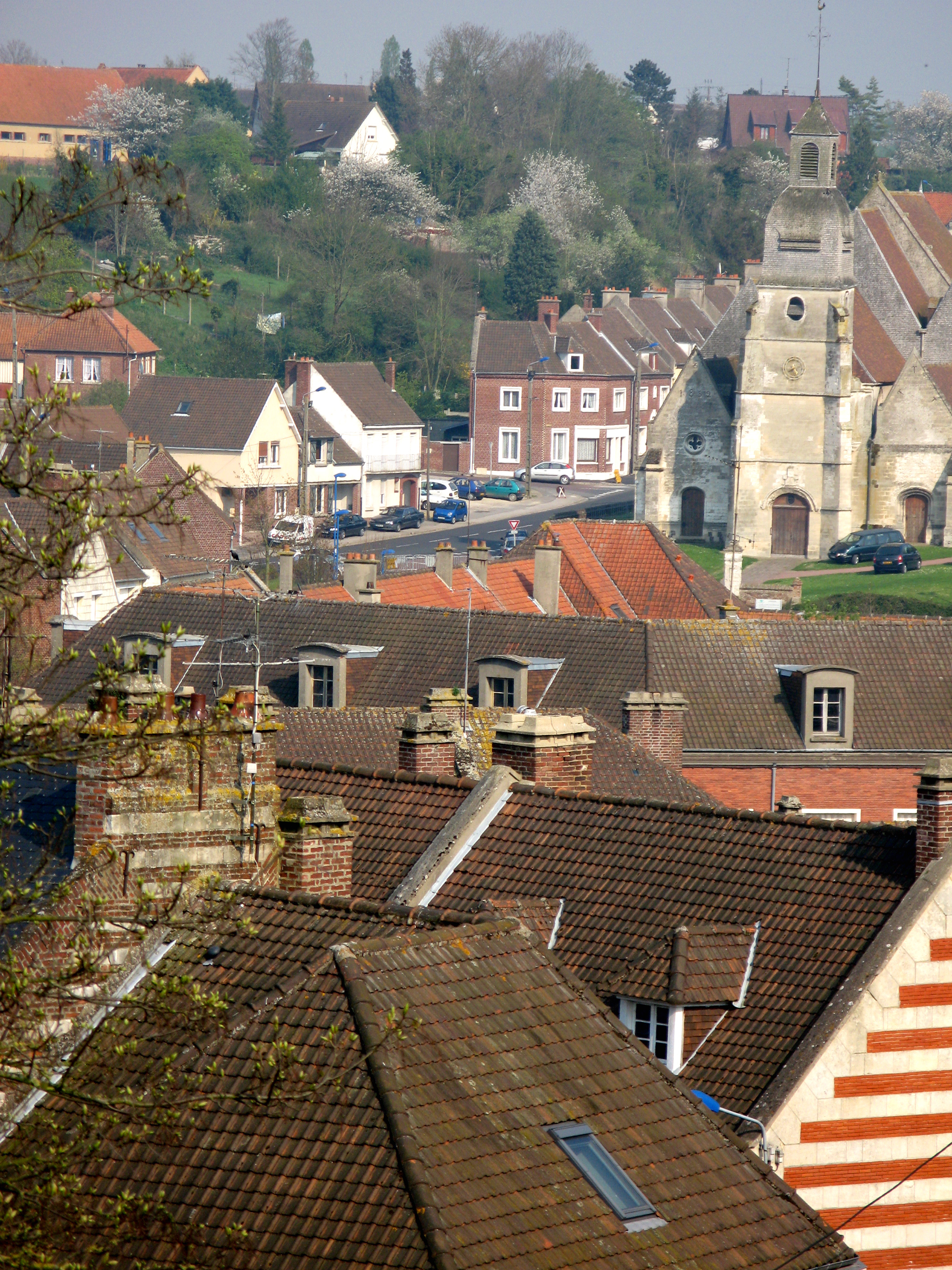
- A rooftop view of Airaines, with the church of St-Denis

- Coat of arms
- Location of Airaines
- Location within France Location within Hauts-de-France
- Coordinates: 49°57′57″N 1°56′39″E
- Country: France
- Region: Hauts-de-France
- Department: Somme
- Arrondissement: Amiens
- Canton: Ailly-sur-Somme
- Intercommunality: Somme Sud-Ouest

Government
  - Mayor (2020–2026): Albert Noblesse
- Area^{1}: 24.88 km^{2} (9.61 sq mi)
- Elevation: 49 m (161 ft)
- Highest elevation: 116 m (381 ft)
- Lowest elevation: 15 m (49 ft)
- Population (2023): 2,204
  - Density: 88.59/km^{2} (229.4/sq mi)
- Time zone: UTC+01:00 (CET)
  - Summer (DST): UTC+02:00 (CEST)
- INSEE/Postal code: 80013 /80270
- ^{1} French Land Register data, which excludes lakes, ponds, glaciers > 1 km^{2} (0.386 sq mi or 247 acres) and river estuaries.

Airaines (French pronunciation: [ɛʁɛn]; Picard: Araine) is a commune in the Somme department in Hauts-de-France in northern France.

== Geography ==
The commune is situated 30 km (19 mi) north west of Amiens, about 30 km (19 mi) south of Abbeville, at the junction of the D901 and D936 roads.

=== Hamlets and neighbourhoods ===
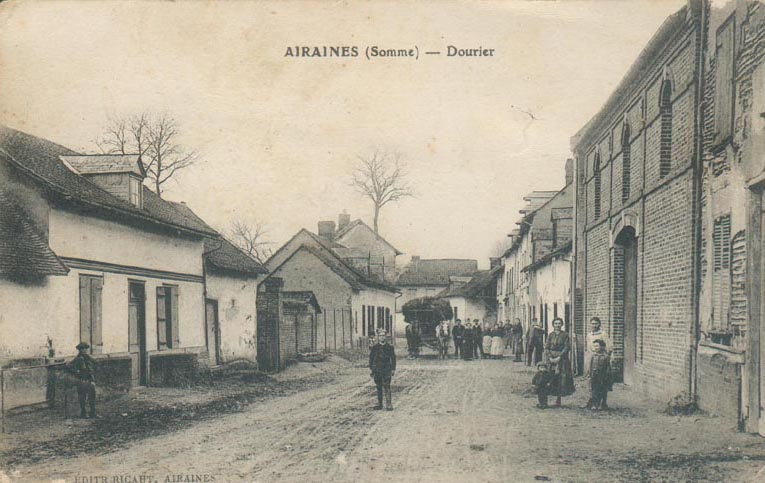
Dourier before 1914

- Dourier : Originally a hamlet to the northeast of the town, now a suburb.
- Dreuil-Hamel : Stretching out to the west, sprinkled with orchards and meadows, this commune was once separate. By decree of 26 September 1972 it was joined with Airaines in a simple merger.

== Population ==
Historical population
| Year | Pop. | ±% p.a. |
|---|---|---|
| 1968 | 2,239 | — |
| 1975 | 2,303 | +0.40% |
| 1982 | 2,385 | +0.50% |
| 1990 | 2,175 | −1.15% |
| 1999 | 2,099 | −0.39% |
| 2007 | 2,153 | +0.32% |
| 2012 | 2,363 | +1.88% |
| 2017 | 2,378 | +0.13% |
| 2023 | 2,204 | −1.26% |
Source: INSEE

== History ==
- In earlier times, the town flourished, due mainly to the importance of the castle of the dukes of Luynes.
- During World War II, the town was subject to much destruction in June 1940. The Market hall was destroyed.
- The years 1985-2000 saw the closure of several important economical activities, resulting in high unemployment
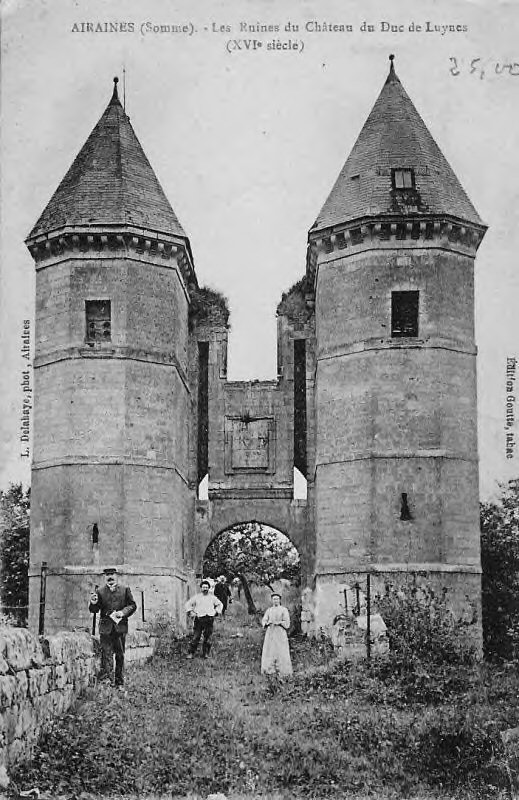
The towers before 1914

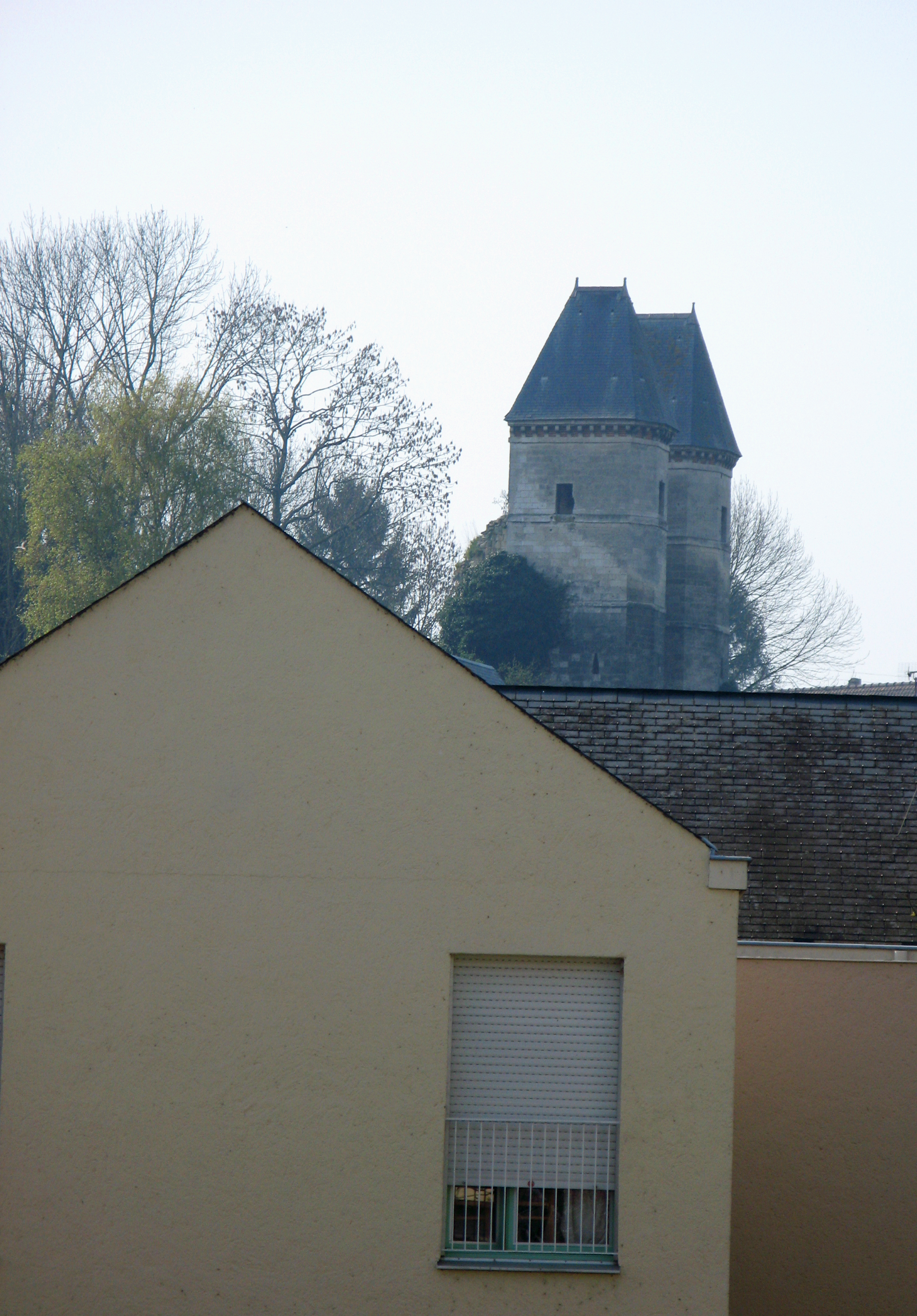
Luynes towers in 2007

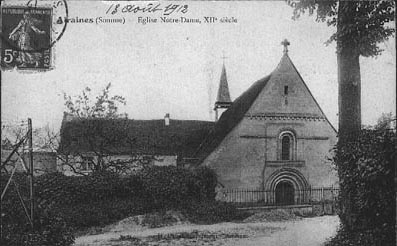
Notre-Dame church before 1914

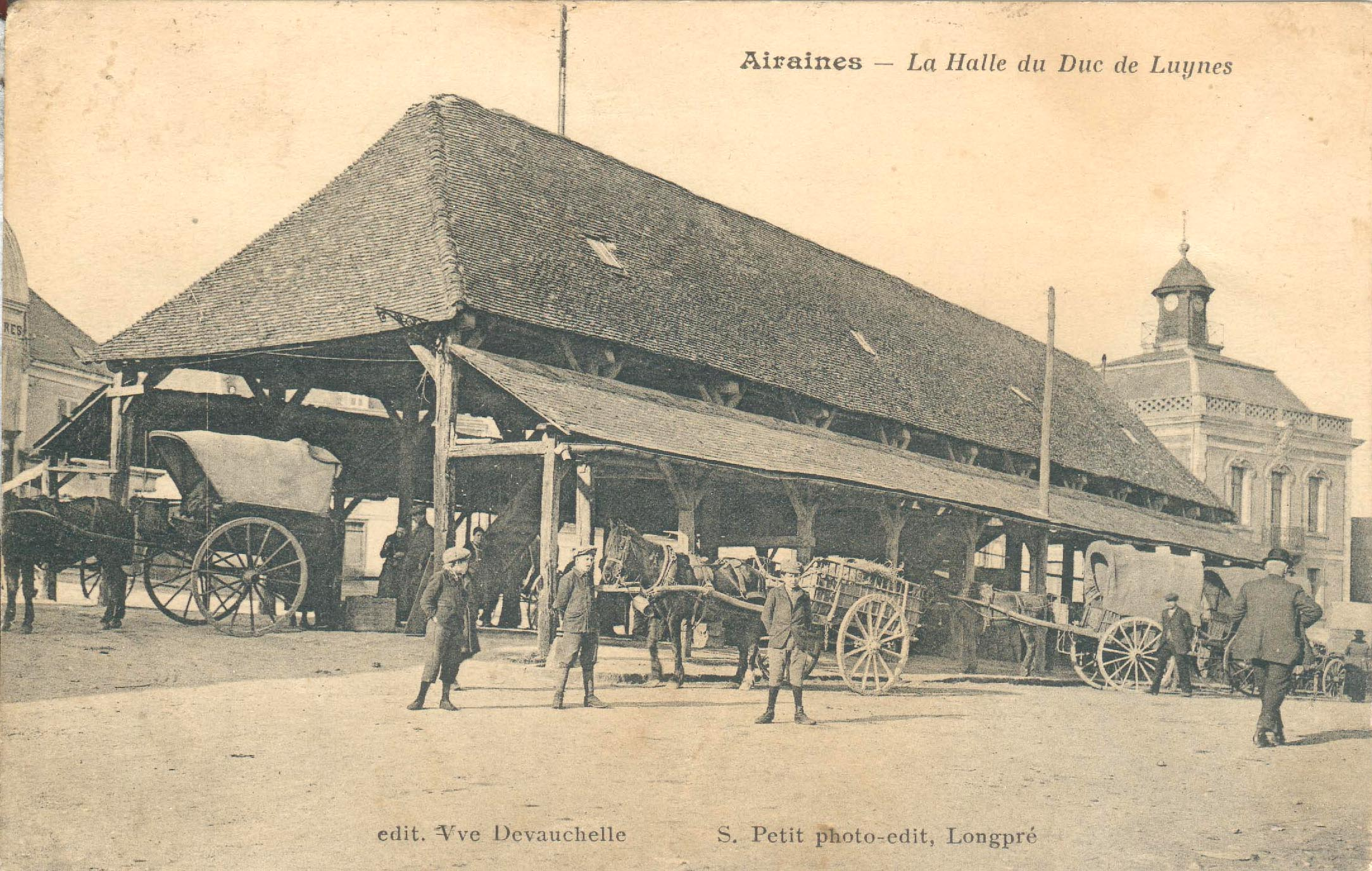
Market hall before 1914

== Places and monuments ==
- Saint-Denis church
- The Priory (Notre Dame church)
- Dreuil-Hamel church, abandoned and in danger of collapsing
- The towers of the dukes of Luynes
- The memorial to Charles N'Tchoréré
- A monument aux morts with sculptural work by Albert Dominique Roze
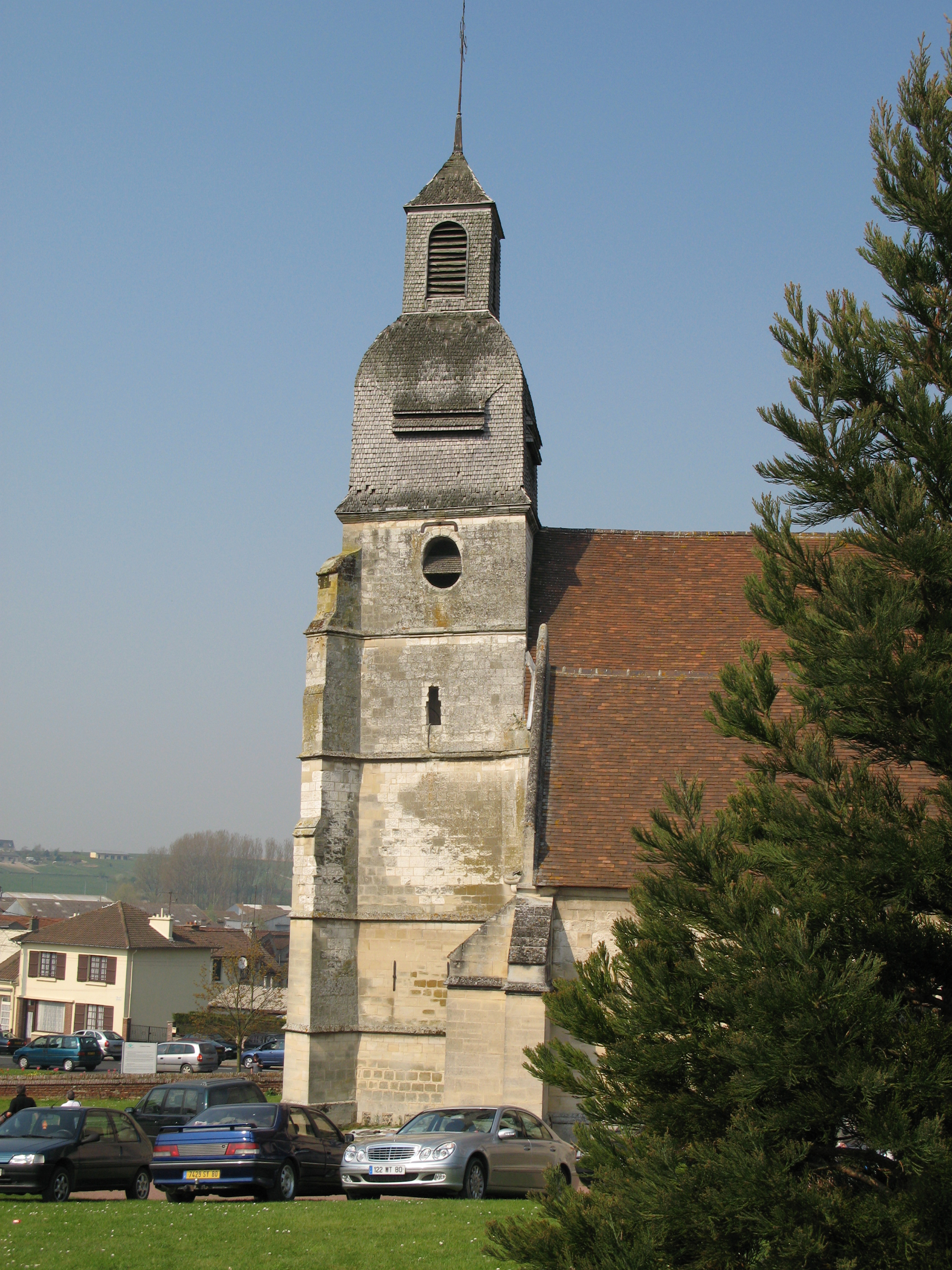
St-Denis church tower

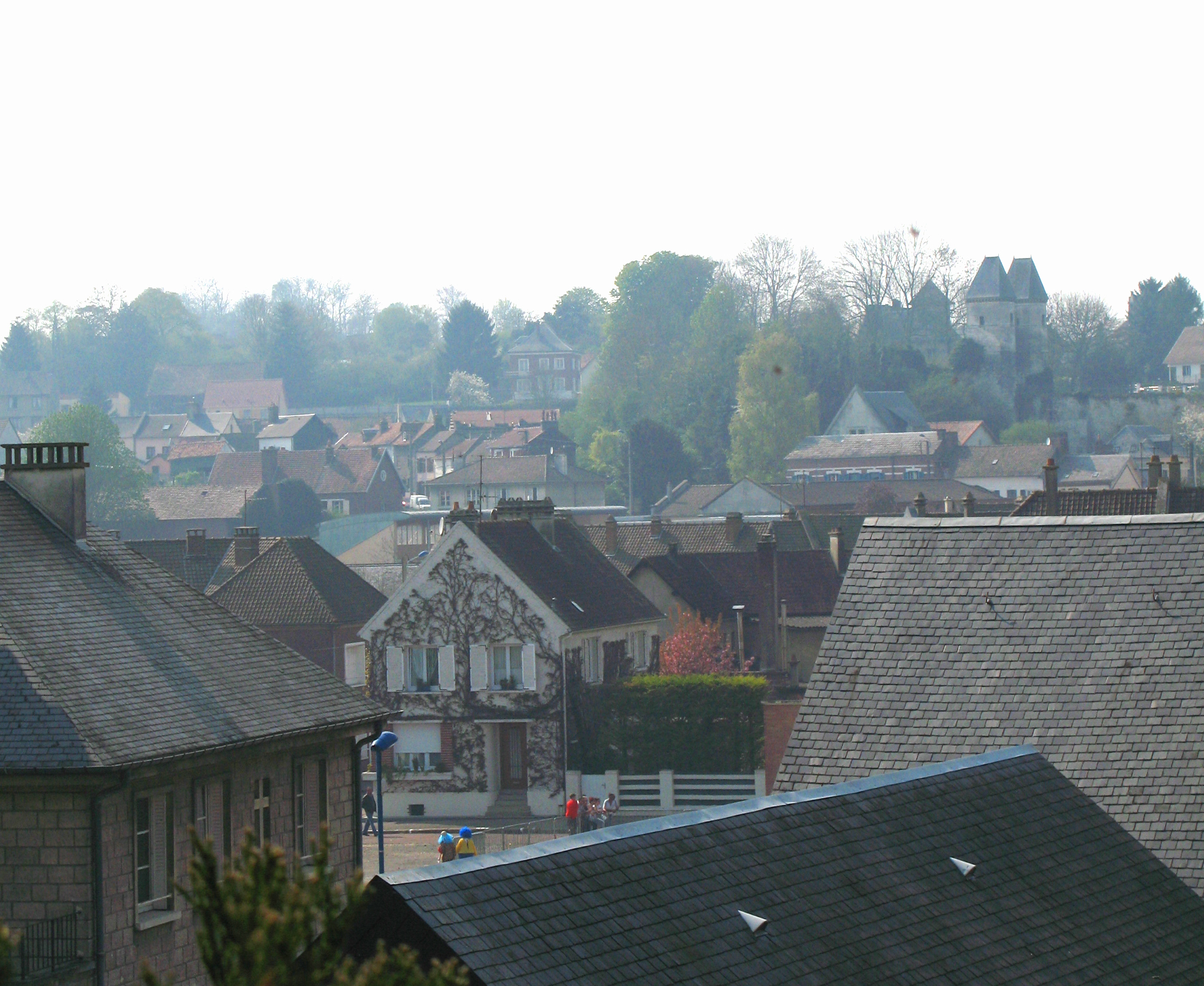
Luynes towers

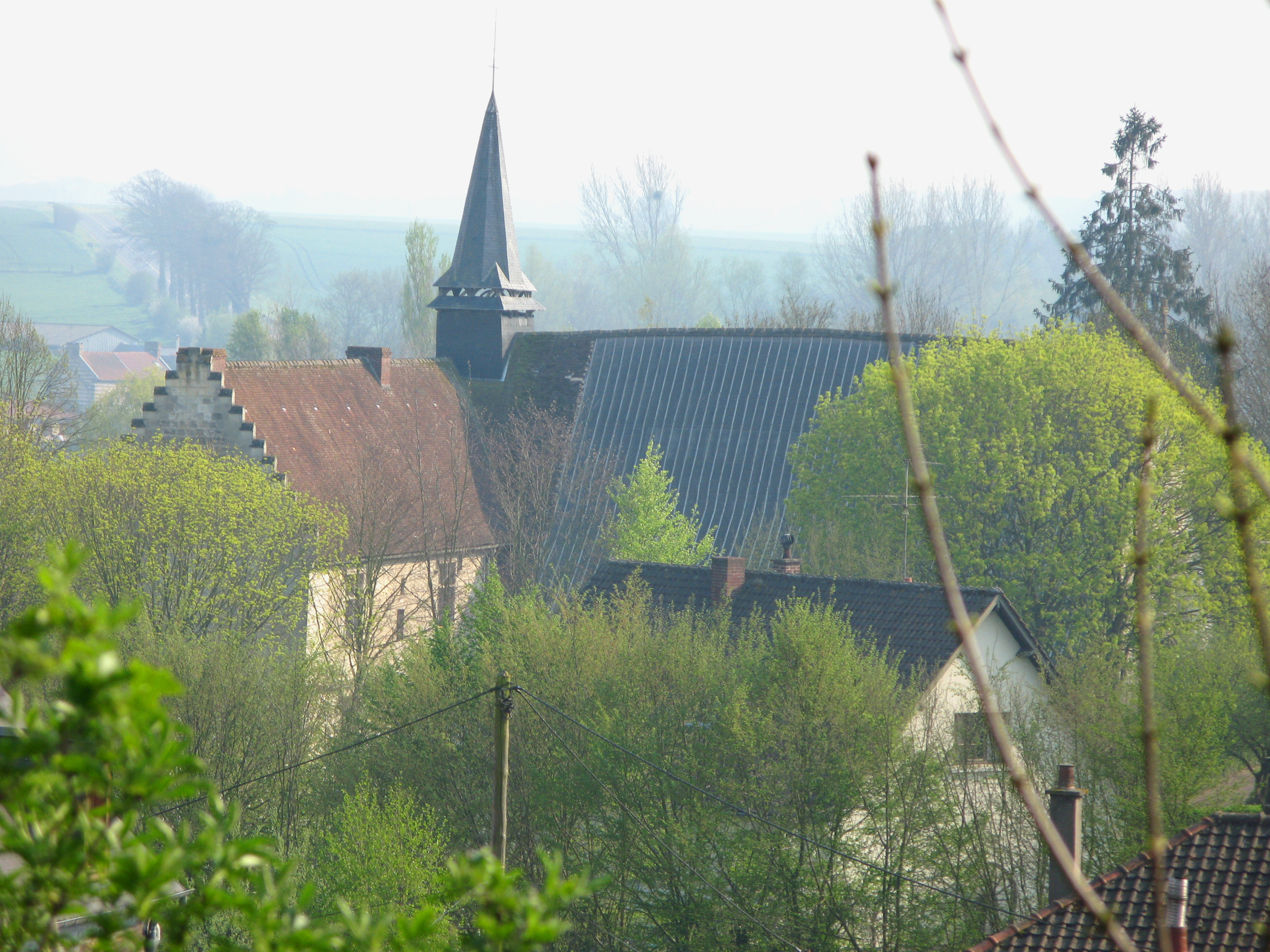
The Priory

== People ==
Charles N'Tchoréré (15 November 1896 - 1940) was a Gabonese military commander who was shot by the Germans in World War II during the battle for France.

== Twin towns ==
- Kriftel, Germany

== See also ==
- Communes of the Somme department
- War memorials (Western Somme)
