= Beauchamps, Somme =

Beauchamps
- Commune
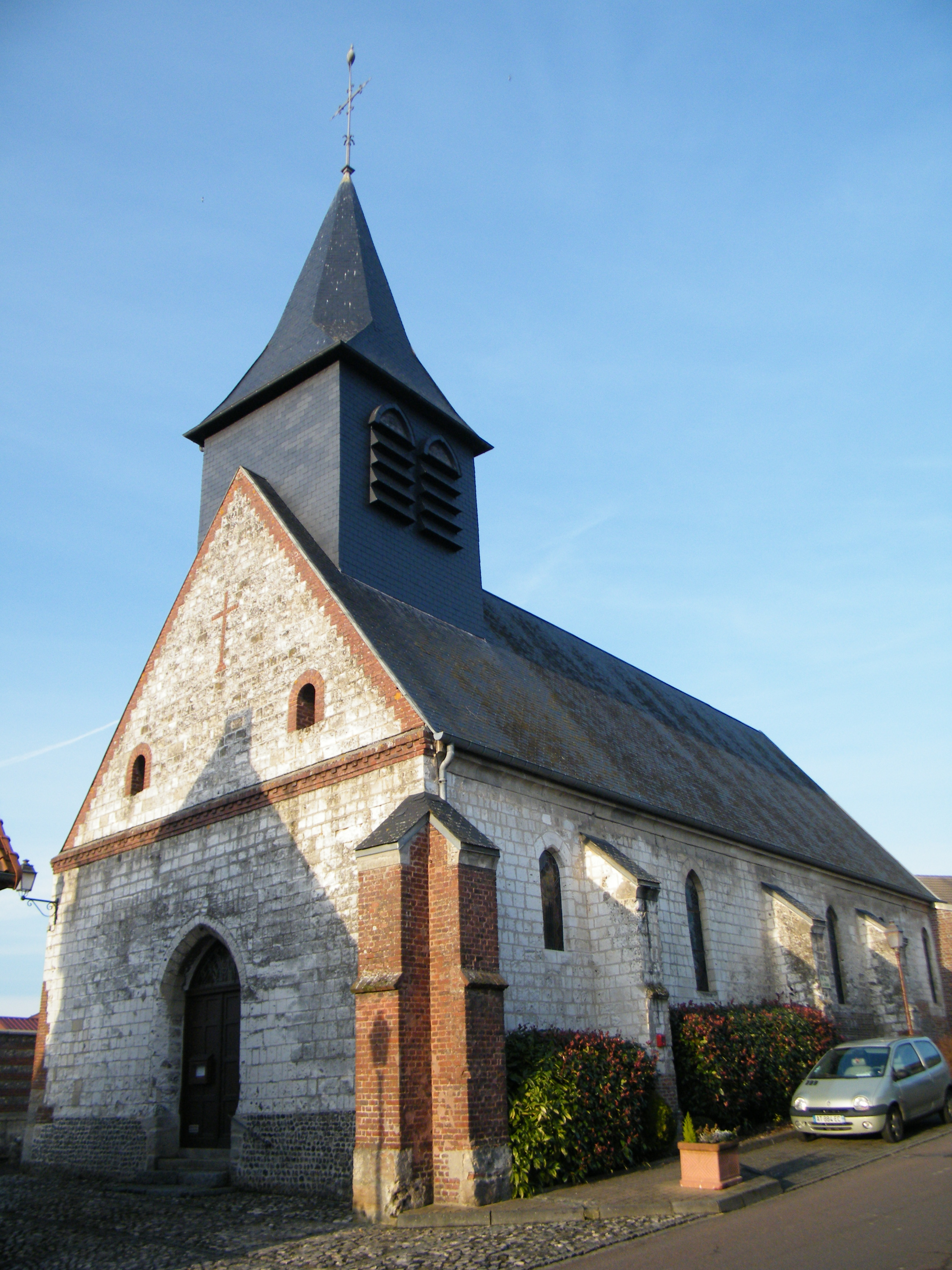
- The church of Beauchamps

- Coat of arms
- Location of Beauchamps
- Location within France Location within Hauts-de-France
- Coordinates: 50°01′05″N 1°30′33″E
- Country: France
- Region: Hauts-de-France
- Department: Somme
- Arrondissement: Abbeville
- Canton: Gamaches
- Intercommunality: CC Villes Sœurs

Government
  - Mayor (2020–2026): Jean-Charles Vitaux
- Area^{1}: 7.22 km^{2} (2.79 sq mi)
- Elevation: 16 m (52 ft)
- Highest elevation: 110 m (360 ft)
- Lowest elevation: 10 m (33 ft)
- Population (2023): 937
  - Density: 130/km^{2} (336/sq mi)
- Time zone: UTC+01:00 (CET)
  - Summer (DST): UTC+02:00 (CEST)
- INSEE/Postal code: 80063 /80770
- ^{1} French Land Register data, which excludes lakes, ponds, glaciers > 1 km^{2} (0.386 sq mi or 247 acres) and river estuaries.

Beauchamps (French pronunciation: [boʃɑ̃]) is a commune in the Somme department in Hauts-de-France in northern France.

== Geography ==
Situated at the junction of the D 2 and D 1015 roads by the banks of the river Bresle, the border of the departments of the Somme and Seine-Maritime.

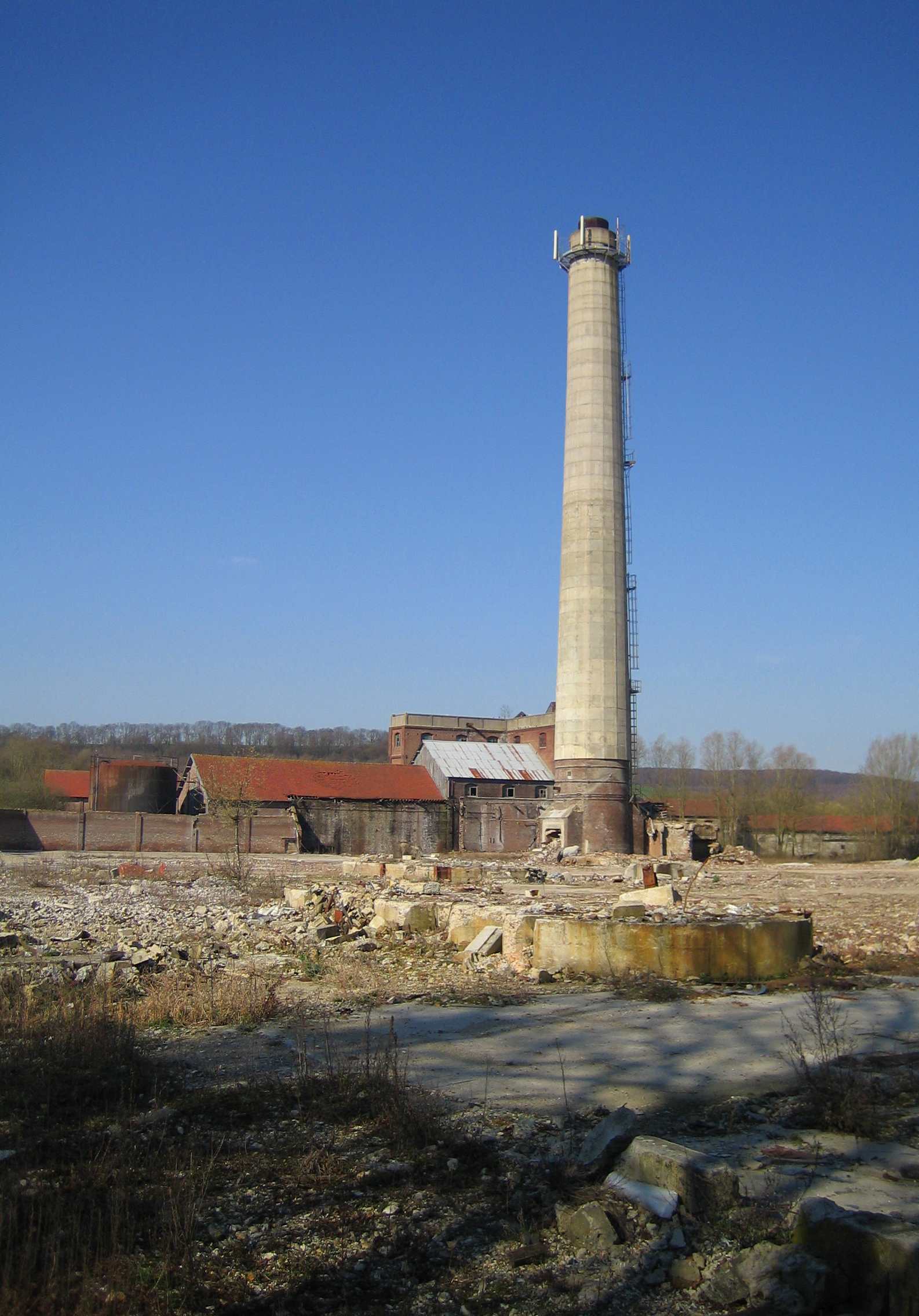
The waste-ground of the old sugar factory

== Population ==
Historical population
Year	Pop.	±% p.a.
1968	883	—
1975	900	+0.27%
1982	908	+0.13%
1990	1,011	+1.35%
1999	987	−0.27%
2007	1,040	+0.66%
2012	1,030	−0.19%
2017	996	−0.67%
2023	937	−1.01%
Source: INSEE

== See also ==
- Communes of the Somme department
