= Rue, Somme =

Rue
- Commune
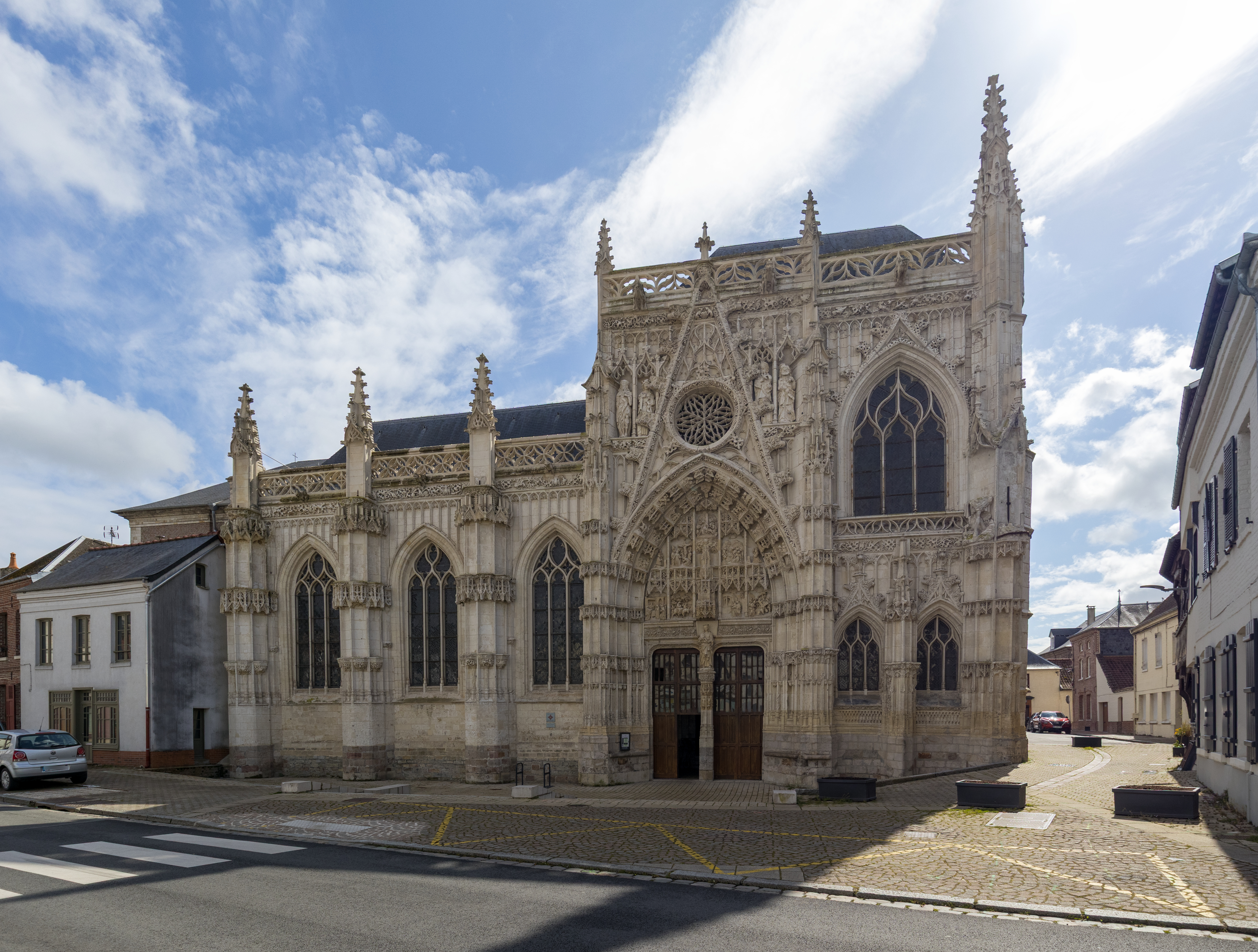
- Chapelle du Saint-Esprit in Rue

- Coat of arms
- Location of Rue
- Location within France Location within Hauts-de-France
- Coordinates: 50°16′23″N 1°40′07″E
- Country: France
- Region: Hauts-de-France
- Department: Somme
- Arrondissement: Abbeville
- Canton: Rue
- Intercommunality: CC Ponthieu-Marquenterre

Government
  - Mayor (2026–32): Christophe Dufrénoy
- Area^{1}: 29.06 km^{2} (11.22 sq mi)
- Elevation: 9 m (30 ft)
- Highest elevation: 12 m (39 ft)
- Lowest elevation: 2 m (6.6 ft)
- Population (2023): 2,987
  - Density: 102.8/km^{2} (266.2/sq mi)
- Time zone: UTC+01:00 (CET)
  - Summer (DST): UTC+02:00 (CEST)
- INSEE/Postal code: 80688 /80120
- ^{1} French Land Register data, which excludes lakes, ponds, glaciers > 1 km^{2} (0.386 sq mi or 247 acres) and river estuaries.

Rue (French pronunciation: [ʁy]) is a commune in the Somme department in Hauts-de-France in northern France.

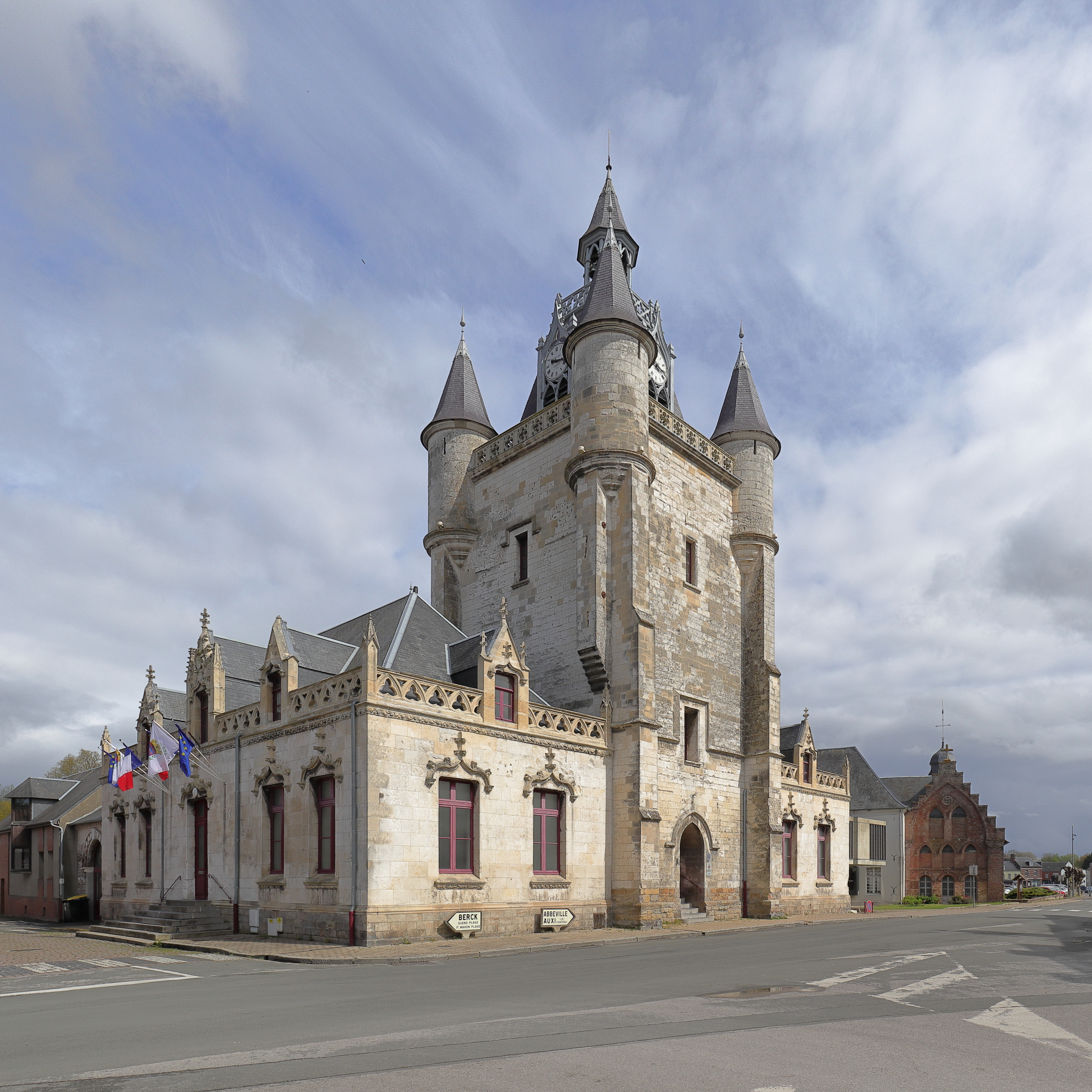
The belfry

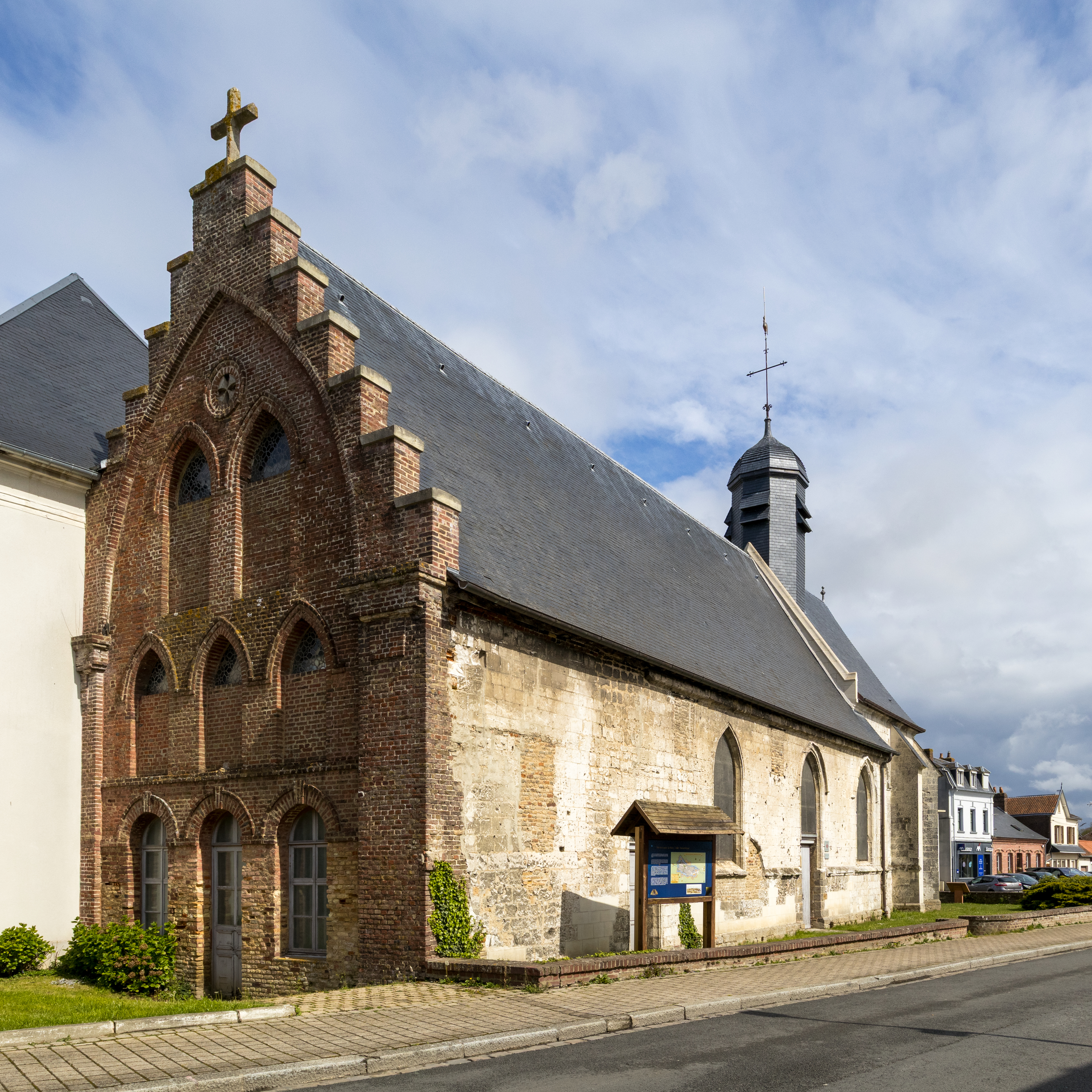
Hospice Chapel

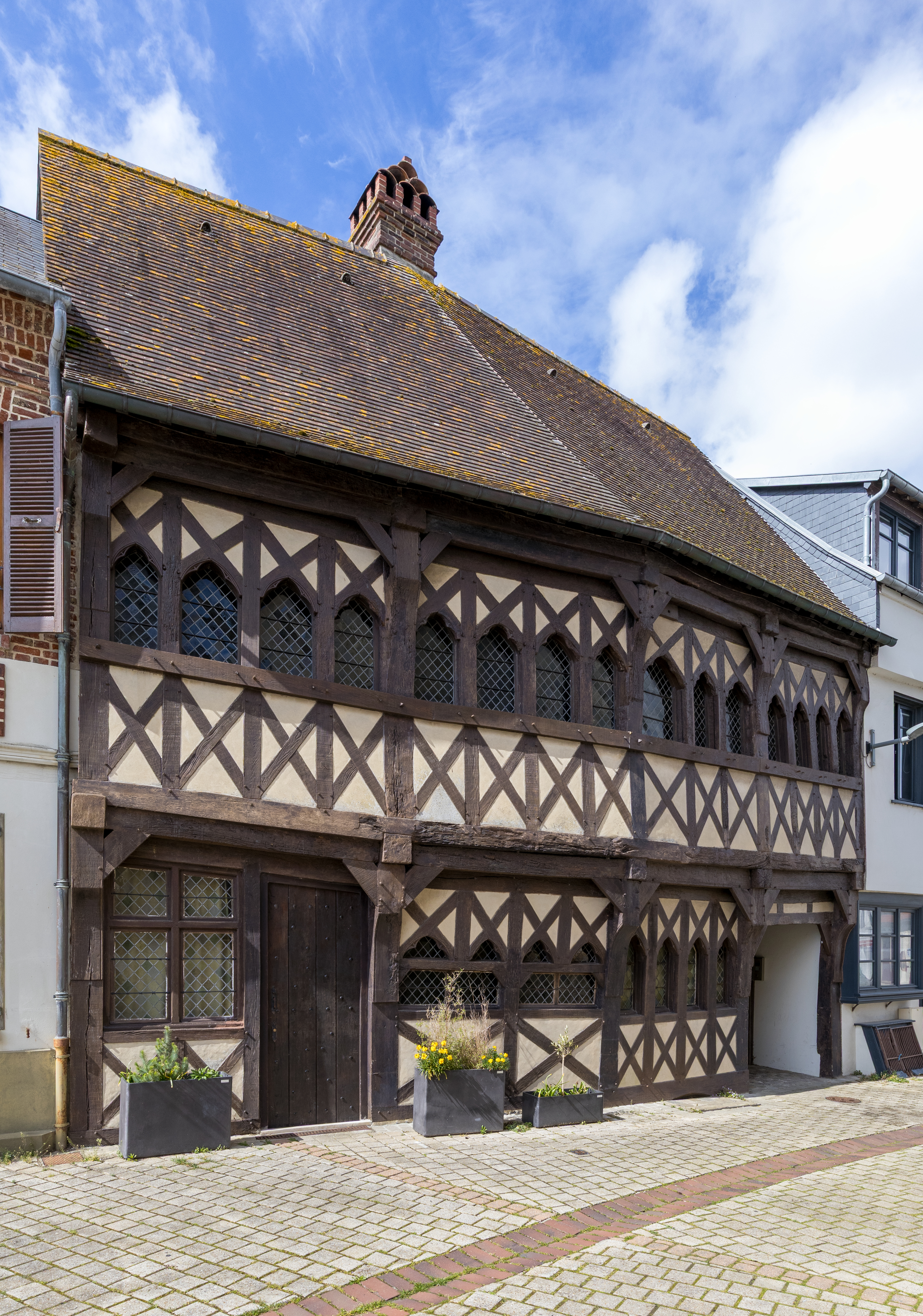
Medieval House

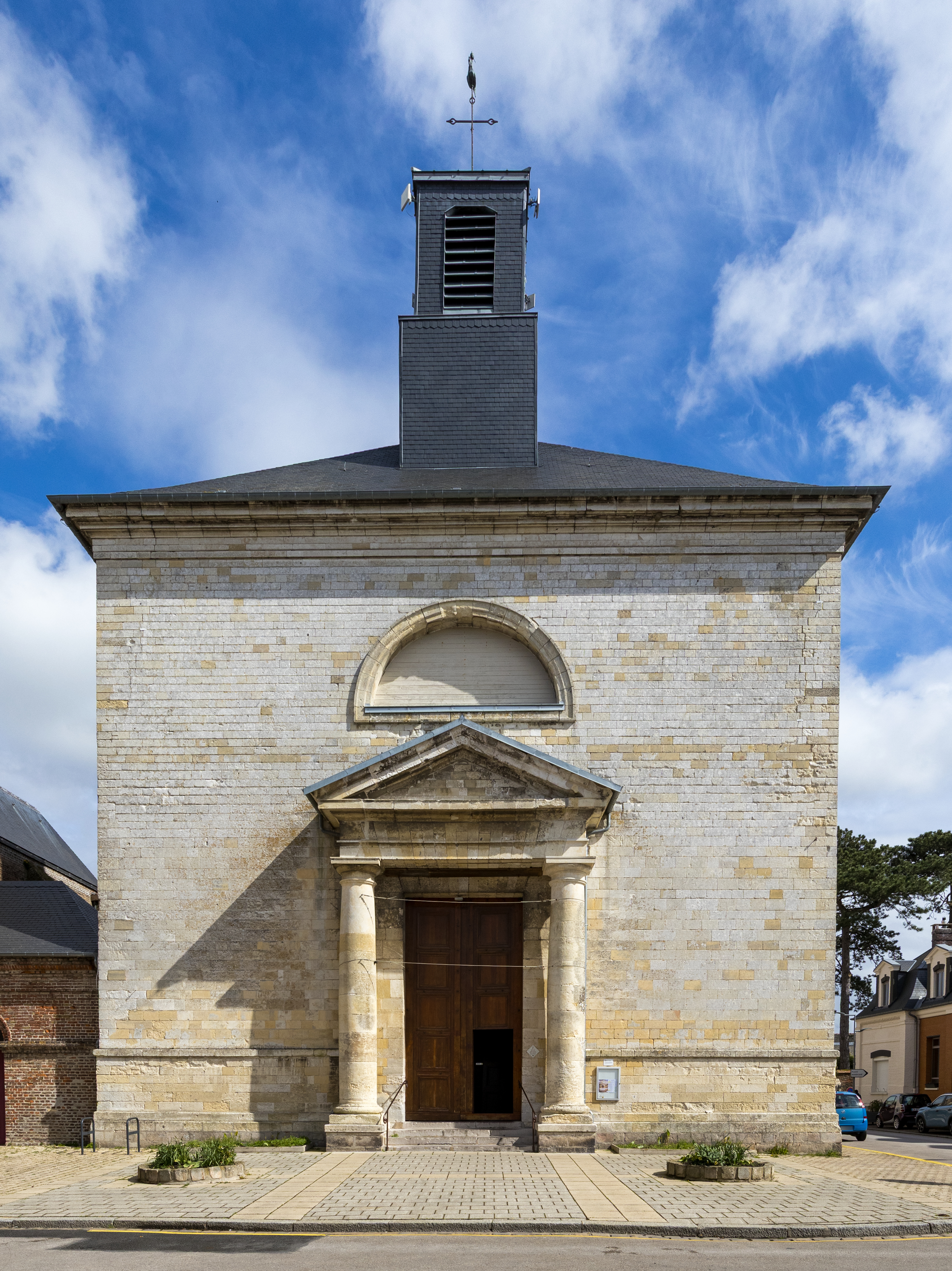
Saint Wulphy Church

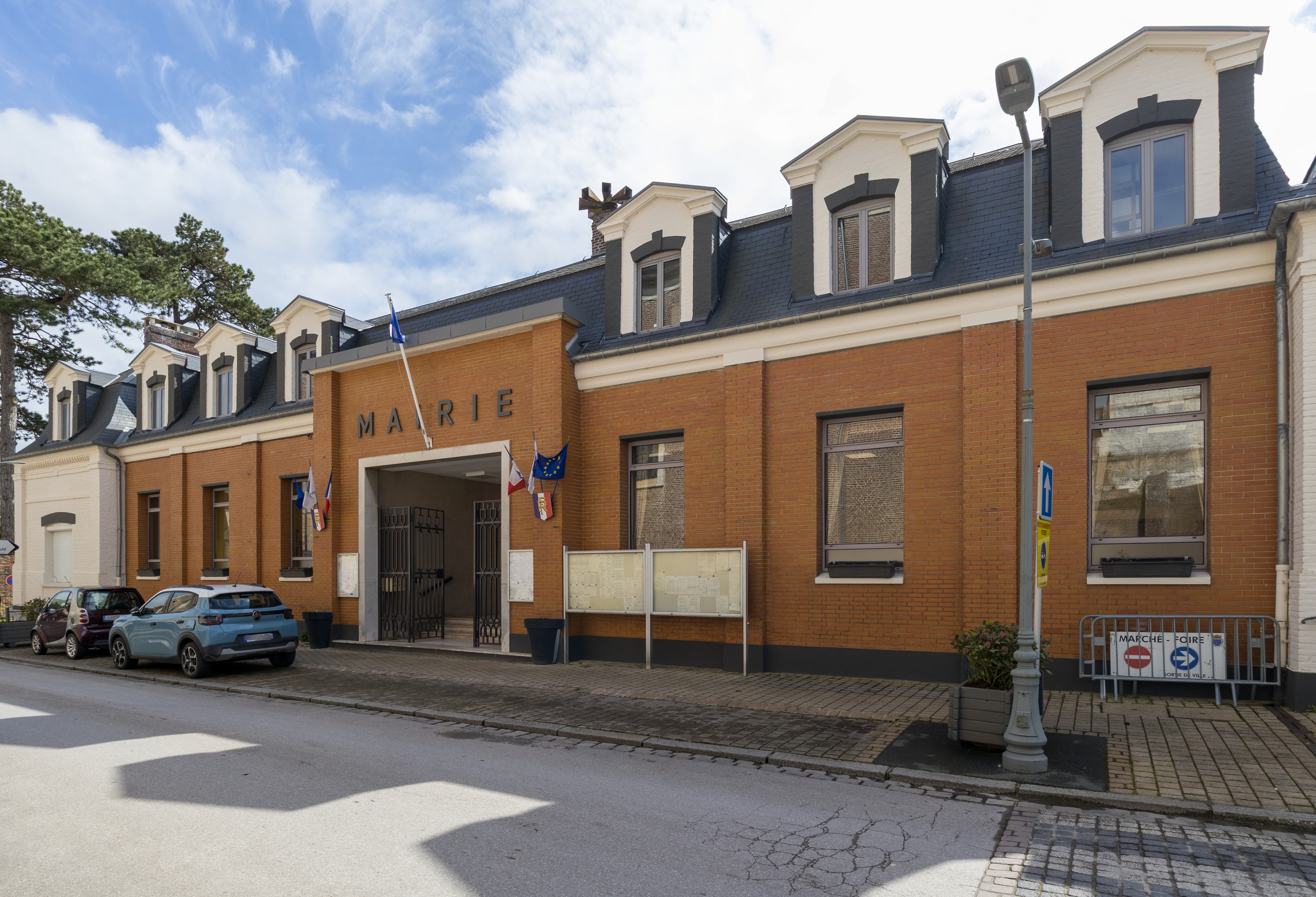
Town Hall

== Geography ==
Rue is situated some 15 miles (24 km) north of Abbeville, on the junction of the D938, D4 and D85 roads.

== Transports ==
The railway station

Rue has a railway station on the Paris-Boulogne line. Rue station has rail connections to Amiens, Calais and Paris.

== Population ==
Historical population
Year	Pop.	±% p.a.
1968	2,952	—
1975	3,122	+0.80%
1982	3,170	+0.22%
1990	2,942	−0.93%
1999	3,075	+0.49%
2007	3,102	+0.11%
2012	3,121	+0.12%
2017	3,101	−0.13%
2023	2,987	−0.62%
Source: INSEE

== Toponymy ==
The place is first mentioned as Rua in 1042 (diplôme Henrici Regis Gall. Christ, then Rugua in 1090 - 1110, Rue in 1184.

Medieval place name meaning "street" in French (French word rue is ultimately from Latin ruga).

== Places of interest ==
- The chapel of the Holy Spirit (1440–1514) is one of the finest examples of flamboyant gothic in Picardie.
- The bell tower, which in 2005 was inscribed on the UNESCO World Heritage List along with other belfries of Belgium and France because of their architecture and testimony to the rise of municipal power in the region.

== See also ==
- Communes of the Somme department
- Le Chateau du Broutel
