= Vron =

- Commune
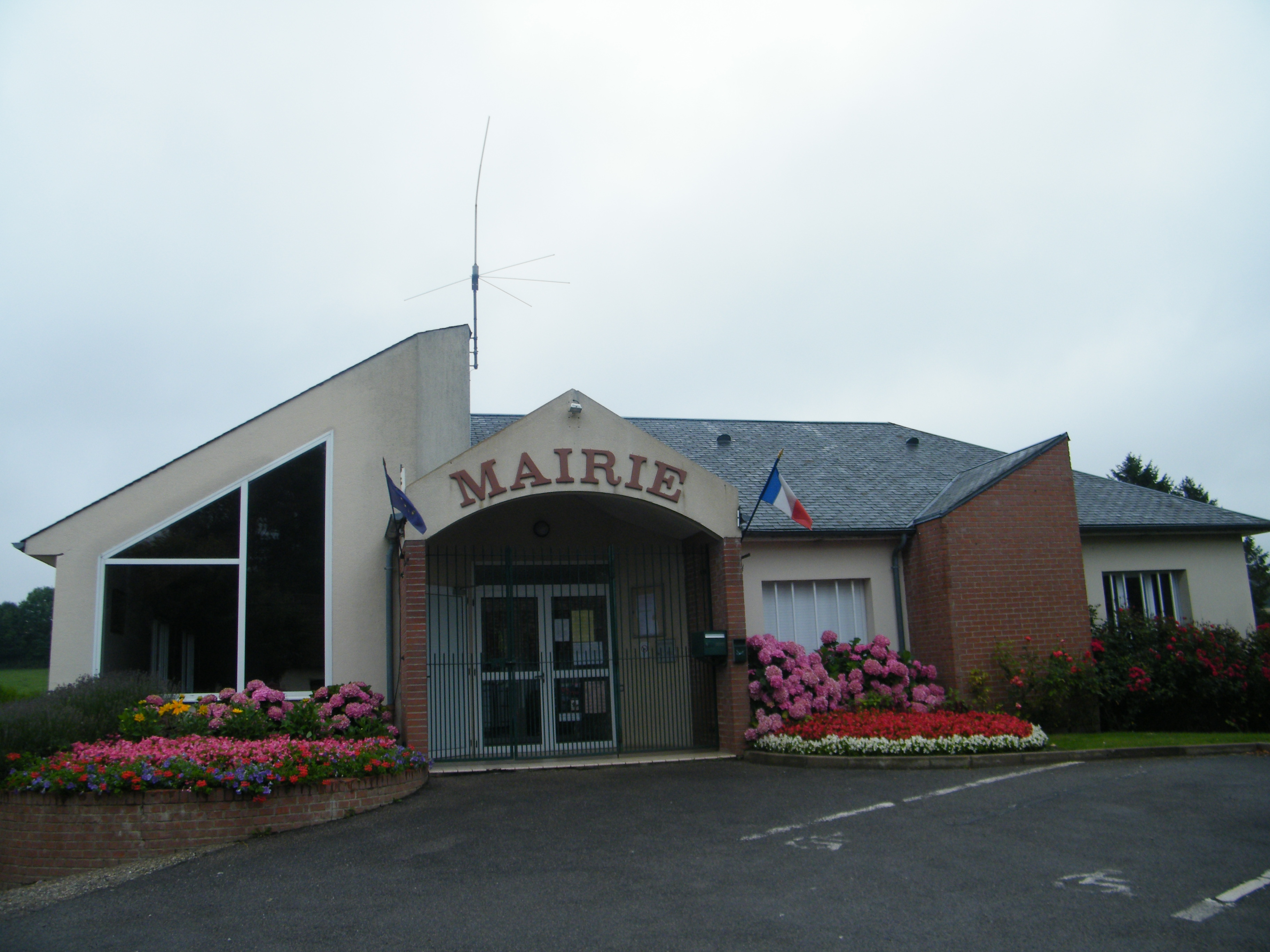
- Town hall

- Coat of arms
- Location of Vron
- Location within France Location within Hauts-de-France
- Coordinates: 50°18′50″N 1°45′16″E
- Country: France
- Region: Hauts-de-France
- Department: Somme
- Arrondissement: Abbeville
- Canton: Rue
- Intercommunality: Ponthieu-Marquenterre

Government
  - Mayor (2020–2026): Patrick Soubry
- Area^{1}: 20.67 km^{2} (7.98 sq mi)
- Elevation: 40 m (130 ft)
- Highest elevation: 68 m (223 ft)
- Lowest elevation: 2 m (6.6 ft)
- Population (2023): 839
  - Density: 40.6/km^{2} (105/sq mi)
- Time zone: UTC+01:00 (CET)
  - Summer (DST): UTC+02:00 (CEST)
- INSEE/Postal code: 80815 /80120
- ^{1} French Land Register data, which excludes lakes, ponds, glaciers > 1 km^{2} (0.386 sq mi or 247 acres) and river estuaries.

Vron (French pronunciation: [vʁɔ̃]) is a commune in the Somme department in Hauts-de-France in northern France.

== Geography ==
Vron is situated in rolling countryside on the D1001 and D175 road junction 18 miles (29 km) north-northwest of Abbeville.

== Population ==
Historical population
Year	Pop.	±% p.a.
1968	692	—
1975	676	−0.33%
1982	679	+0.06%
1990	729	+0.89%
1999	721	−0.12%
2007	835	+1.85%
2012	844	+0.21%
2017	837	−0.17%
2023	839	+0.04%
Source: INSEE

== Monument aux morts ==
The Vron Monument aux morts features a sculpture by Emmanuel Fontaine - a figure of a poilu (French soldier). A montage of photographs, taken in March 2010, is shown below.

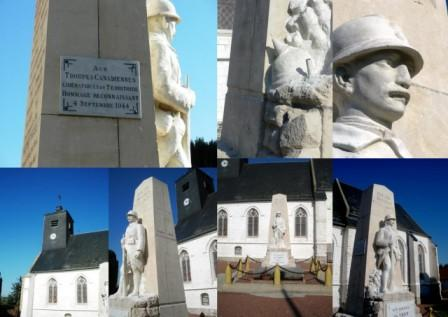
The Vron monument aux morts

== See also ==
- Communes of the Somme department
- War memorials (Western Somme)
