= Carl Van Vechten =

American writer and photographer (1880–1964)

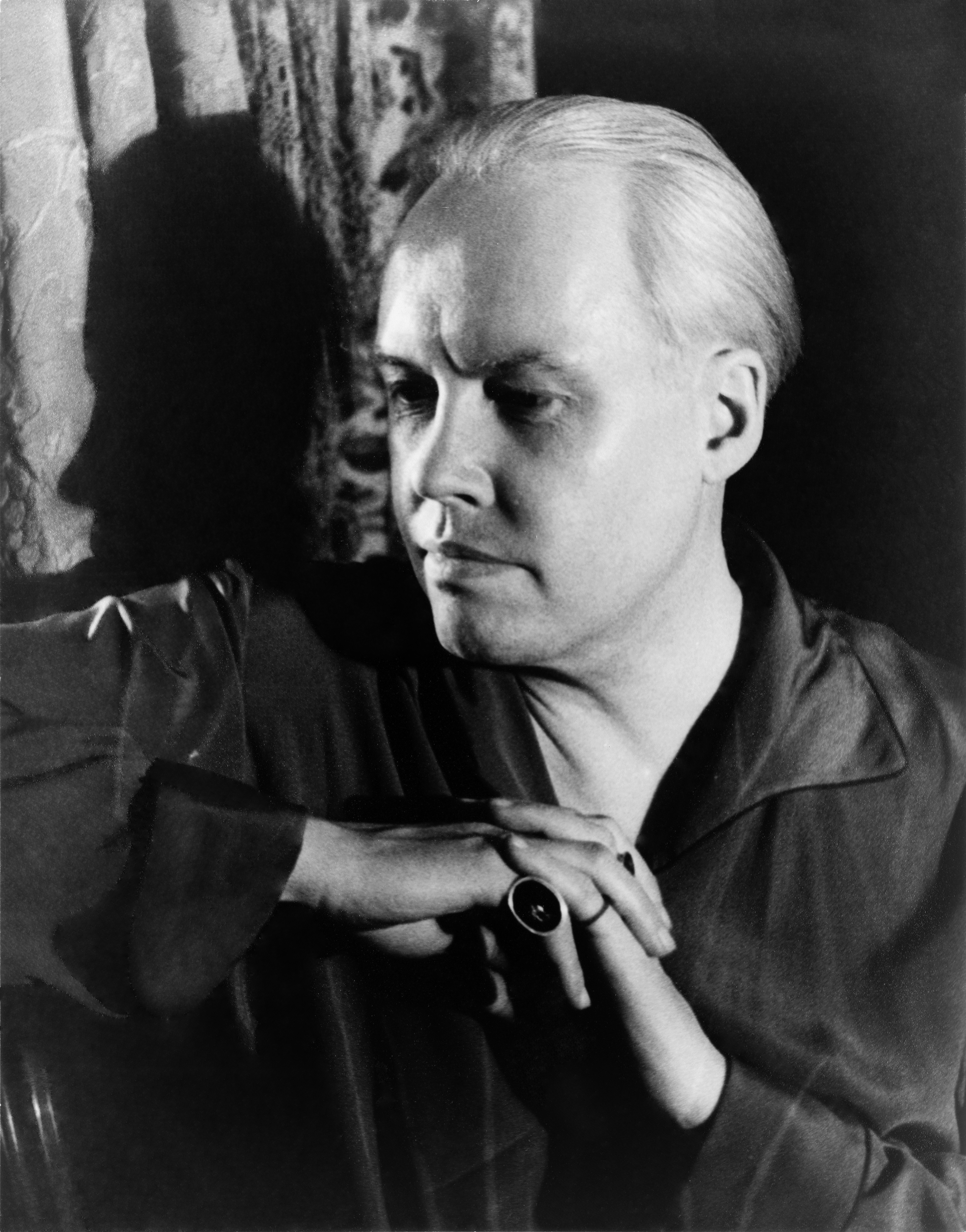
- Self-portrait (1934)
- Born: June 17, 1880; Cedar Rapids, Iowa, U.S.
- Died: December 21, 1964 (aged 84); New York City, U.S.
- Education: University of Chicago
- Occupations: Writer; photographer
- Spouses: Anna Snyder (m. 1907; div. 1912) Fania Marinoff (m. 1914)

Carl Van Vechten (/væn ˈvɛktən/; June 17, 1880 – December 21, 1964) was an American writer and artistic photographer who was a patron of the Harlem Renaissance and the literary executor of Gertrude Stein. He gained fame as a writer, and notoriety as well, for his 1926 novel Nigger Heaven. In his later years, he took up photography and took many portraits of notable people. Although he was married to women for most of his adult years, Van Vechten engaged in numerous affairs with men during his lifetime.

== Life and career ==
Born in Cedar Rapids, Iowa, he was the youngest child of Charles Duane Van Vechten and Ada Amanda Van Vechten (née Fitch). Both of his parents were well educated. His father was a wealthy, prominent banker. His mother established the Cedar Rapids Public Library and had great musical talent. As a child, Van Vechten developed a passion for music and theatre. He graduated from Washington High School in 1898.

After high school, Van Vechten was eager to take the next steps in his life but found it difficult to pursue his passions in Iowa. He described his hometown as "that unloved town". To advance his education, he decided in 1899 to study at the University of Chicago, where he studied a variety of topics including music, art, and opera. As a student, he became increasingly interested in writing and wrote for the college newspaper, the University of Chicago Weekly.

After graduating from college in 1903, Van Vechten accepted a job as a columnist for the Chicago American. In his column "The Chaperone", Van Vechten covered many different topics through a style of semi-autobiographical gossip and criticism. During his time with the Chicago American, he was occasionally asked to include photographs with his column. This was the first time he is thought to have experimented with photography, which later became one of his greatest passions. Van Vechten was fired from his position with the Chicago American because of what was described as an elaborate and complicated style of writing. Some commentators jokingly described his contributions to the paper as "lowering the tone" of the lowbrow and sensationalist Hearst papers. In 1906, he moved to New York City. He was hired as the assistant music critic at The New York Times. His interest in opera had him take a leave of absence from the paper in 1907 to travel to Europe and explore opera.

While in England, he married Anna Snyder, his longtime friend from Cedar Rapids. He returned to his job at The New York Times in 1909, where he became the first American critic of modern dance. Through the guidance of his mentor, Mabel Dodge Luhan, he became engrossed in the avant-garde. He began to frequently attend groundbreaking musical premieres at the time when Isadora Duncan, Anna Pavlova, and Loie Fuller were performing in New York City. He also attended premieres in Paris, where he met American author and poet Gertrude Stein in 1913. He became a devoted friend and champion of Stein and was considered to be one of Stein's most enthusiastic fans. They continued corresponding for the remainder of Stein's life, and, at her death, she appointed Van Vechten her literary executor; he helped to bring into print her unpublished writings. A collection of the letters between Van Vechten and Stein has been published.

Van Vechten wrote a piece called "How to Read Gertrude Stein" for the arts magazine The Trend. In his piece, Van Vechten attempted to demystify Stein and bring clarity to her works. Van Vechten came to the conclusion that Stein can be best understood when one has been guided through her work by an "expert insider". He writes that "special writers require special readers".

The marriage to Anna Snyder ended in divorce in 1912, and he wed actress Fania Marinoff in 1914. Van Vechten and Marinoff were known for ignoring the social separation of races during the times and for inviting black people to their home for social gatherings. They were also known to attend public gatherings for black people and to visit black friends in their homes.

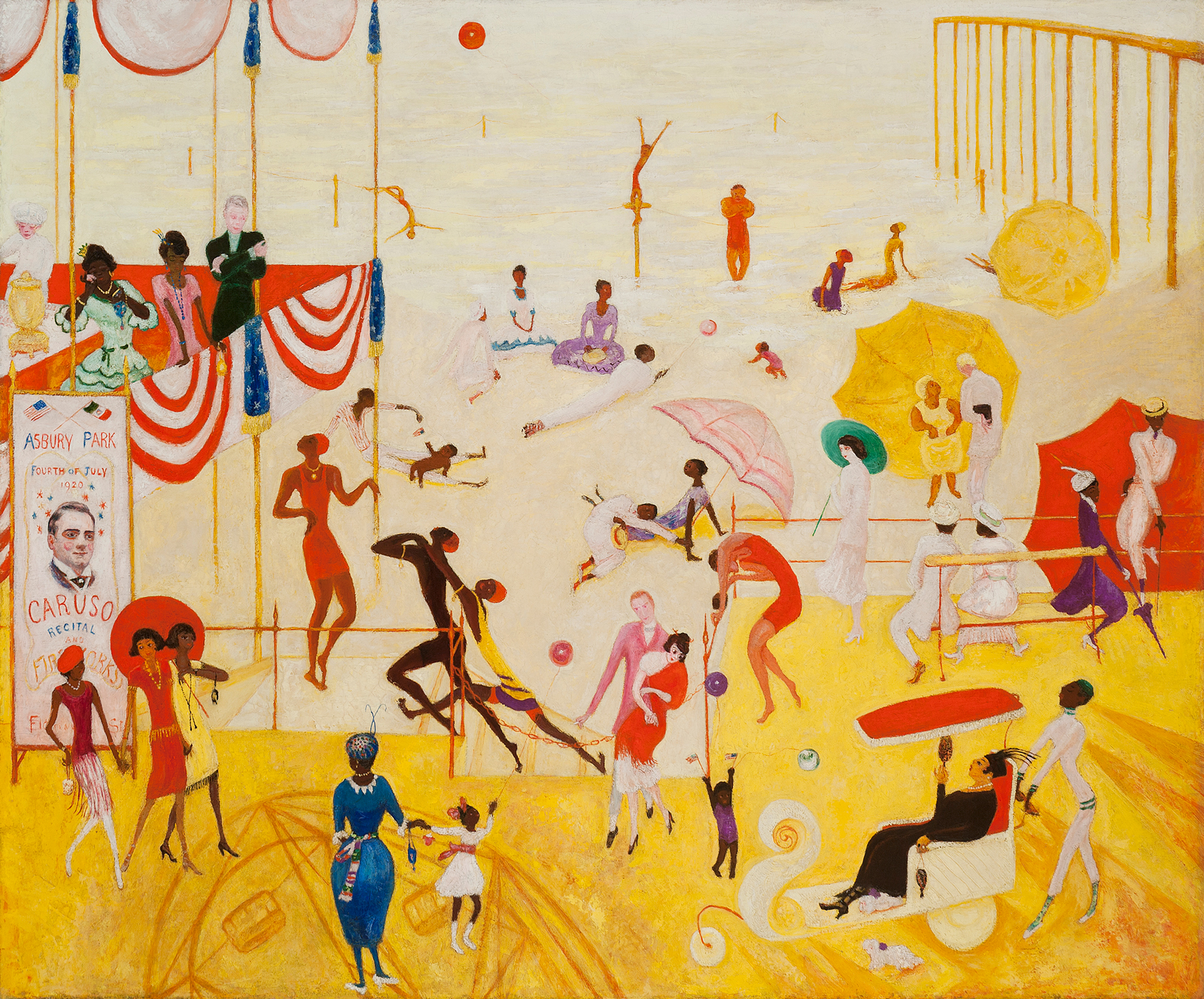
Van Vechten is depicted in Asbury Park South, 1920 painting by Jazz Age artist Florine Stettheimer. Amid a summer crowd in Asbury Park, the artist is under a green parasol, several of her friends are also recognizable. Van Vechten stands on the elevated structure left (black suit), Avery Hopwood (white suit, right side) talks with a woman in a yellow dress, and the Swiss painter Paul Thévanaz (red bathing suit) bends over a camera. Artist Marcel Duchamp (pink suit) walks with Van Vechten's wife, the actress Fania Marinoff.

Although Van Vechten's marriage to Fania Marinoff lasted for 50 years, they often argued about Van Vechten's affairs with men. Van Vechten kept a circle of handsome young men around him, including Donald Angus, Jimmie Daniels, Max Ewing, and Prentiss Taylor. Van Vechten was also known to have romantic and sexual relationships with men, especially Mark Lutz. Lutz (1901–1968) grew up in Richmond, Virginia, and was introduced to Van Vechten by Hunter Stagg in New York in 1931. Lutz was a model for some of Van Vechten's earliest experiments with photography. The friendship lasted until Van Vechten's death. At Lutz's death, as per his wishes, the correspondence with Van Vechten, amounting to 10,000 letters, was destroyed. Lutz donated his collection of Van Vechten's photographs to the Philadelphia Museum of Art.

Several books of Van Vechten's essays on various subjects, such as music and literature, were published between 1915 and 1920, and Van Vechten also served as an informal scout for the newly formed Alfred A. Knopf. Between 1922 and 1930, Knopf published seven novels by him, starting with Peter Whiffle: His Life and Works and ending with Parties. His sexuality is most clearly reflected in his intensely homoerotic portraits of working-class men.

As an appreciator of the arts, Van Vechten was extremely intrigued by the explosion of creativity that was occurring in Harlem. He was drawn towards the tolerance of Harlem society and the excitement it generated among black writers and artists. He also felt most accepted there as a gay man. Van Vechten promoted many of the major figures of the Harlem Renaissance, including Paul Robeson, Langston Hughes, Ethel Waters, Richard Wright, Zora Neale Hurston, and Wallace Thurman. Van Vechten's controversial novel Nigger Heaven was published in 1926. His essay "Negro Blues Singers" was published in Vanity Fair in 1926. Biographer Edward White suggests Van Vechten was convinced that African American culture was the essence of America.

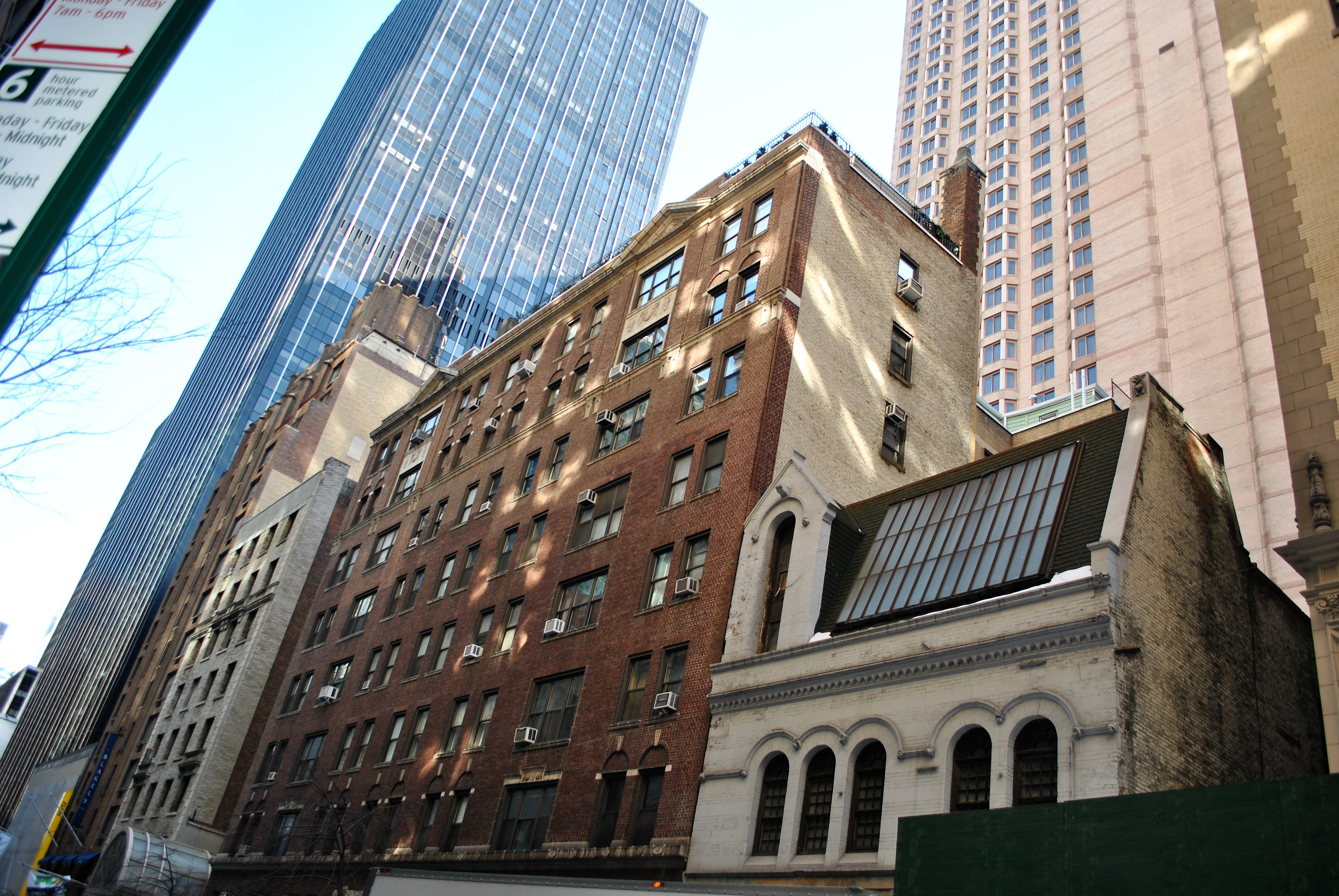
Van Vechten House and Studio, Manhattan, New York City, 2017

Van Vechten played a critical role in the Harlem Renaissance and helped to bring greater clarity to the African-American movement. However, for a long time he was also seen as a very controversial figure. In Van Vechten's early writings, he claimed that black people were born to be entertainers and sexually "free". In other words, he believed that black people should be free to explore their sexuality and singers should follow their natural talents such as jazz, spirituals, and blues. Van Vechten wrote about his experiences of attending a Bessie Smith concert at the Orpheum Theatre in Newark, New Jersey, in 1925.

In Harlem, Van Vechten often attended operas and cabarets. He was credited for the surge in white interest in Harlem nightlife and culture as well as involved in helping well-respected writers such as Langston Hughes and Nella Larsen to find publishers for their early works.

In 2001, Emily Bernard published Remember Me to Harlem, a collection of letters that documents the long friendship between Van Vechten and Langston Hughes, who publicly defended Nigger Heaven. Bernard's 2010 book Carl Van Vechten and the Harlem Renaissance: A Portrait in Black and White explores the messy and uncomfortable realities of race, and the complicated tangle of black and white in America.

His older brother Ralph Van Vechten died on June 28, 1927; when Ralph's widow Fannie died in 1928, Van Vechten inherited $1 million invested in a trust fund, which was unaffected by the stock market crash of 1929 and provided financial support for Carl and Fania.

By 1930, at the age of 50, Van Vechten was finished with writing and took up photography, using his apartment at 150 West 55th Street as a studio, where he photographed many notable people.

Van Vechten died in 1964 at the age of 84 in New York City. His ashes were scattered over the Shakespeare garden in Central Park. He was the subject of a 1968 biography by Bruce Kellner, Carl Van Vechten and the Irreverent Decades, as well as Edward White's 2014 biography, The Tastemaker: Carl Van Vechten and the Birth of Modern America. In the 2015 HBO film Bessie, about blues singer Bessie Smith, Van Vechten is portrayed by Oliver Platt and is shown discussing his novel Nigger Heaven.

== Works ==
At the age of 40, Van Vechten wrote the book Peter Whiffle (1922), which established him as a respected novelist. This novel was recognized as contemporary and an important work to the collection of Harlem Renaissance history. In his novel, autobiographical facts were arranged into a fictional form. In addition to Peter Whiffle, Van Vechten wrote several other novels. One is The Tattooed Countess (1924), a disguised manipulation of his memories of growing up in Cedar Rapids. His book The Tiger in the House (1920) explores the quirks and qualities of Van Vechten's most beloved animal, the cat.

One of his more controversial novels, Nigger Heaven (1926), was received with both controversy and praise. Van Vechten called this book "my Negro novel". He intended for this novel to depict how African Americans were living in Harlem and not about the suffering of Black people in the South who were dealing with racism and lynchings. Although many encouraged Van Vechten to reconsider giving his novel such a controversial name, he could not resist having an incendiary title. Some worried that his title would take away from the content of the book. In one letter, his father also cautioned him: "Whatever you may be compelled to say in the book," he wrote, "your present title will not be understood & I feel certain you should change it."

Many black readers were divided over how the novel depicted African Americans. Some felt that it depicted black people as "alien and strange", and others valued the novel for its representation of African Americans as everyday people, with complexity and flaws just like typical white characters. The novel's supporters included Nella Larsen, Langston Hughes, and Gertrude Stein, who all defended the novel for bringing Harlem society and racial issues to the forefront of America.

His supporters also sent him letters to voice their opinions of the novel. Alain Locke sent Van Vechten a letter from Berlin citing his novel Nigger Heaven and the excitement surrounding its release as his primary reason for making an imminent return home. Gertrude Stein sent Van Vechten a letter from France writing that the novel was the best thing he had ever written. Stein also played an important role in the development of the novel.

Well known critics of this novel included African American scholar W. E. B. Du Bois and black novelist Wallace Thurman. Du Bois dismissed the novel as "cheap melodrama". Decades after the book was published, novelist and literary critic Ralph Ellison remembered Van Vechten as a bad influence, an unpleasant character who "introduced a note of decadence into Afro-American literary matters which was not needed". In 1981, David Levering Lewis, historian and author of a classic study of the Harlem Renaissance, called Nigger Heaven a "colossal fraud", a seemingly uplifting book with a message that was overshadowed by "the throb of the tom-tom". He viewed Van Vechten as being driven by "a mixture of commercialism and patronizing sympathy".

- Music After the Great War (1915)
- Music and Bad Manners (1916)
- Interpreters and Interpretations (1917)
- The Merry-Go-Round (1918)
- The Music of Spain (1918)
- In the Garret (1919)
- The Tiger in the House (1920)
- Lords of the Housetops (1921)
- Peter Whiffle (1922)
- The Blind Bow-Boy (1923)
- The Tattooed Countess (1924)
- Red (1925)
- Firecrackers. A Realistic Novel (1925)
- Excavations (1926)
- Nigger Heaven (1926)
- Spider Boy (1928)
- Parties (1930)
- Feathers (1930)
- Sacred and Profane Memories (1932)

Posthumous

- The Dance Writings of Carl Van Vechten (1974)

Source: A bibliography of the writings of Carl Van Vechten at the HathiTrust Digital Library

== Archives and museum collections ==
Most of Van Vechten's personal papers are held by the Beinecke Rare Book and Manuscript Library at Yale University. The Beinecke Library also holds a collection titled Living Portraits: Carl Van Vechten's Color Photographs of African Americans, 1939–1964, a collection of 1,884 color Kodachrome slides.

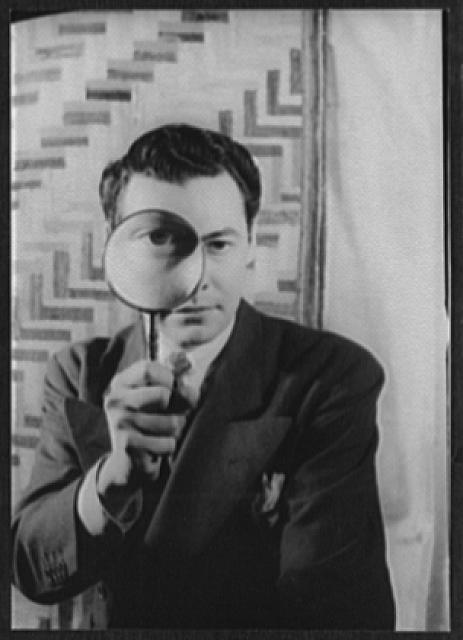
Saul Mauriber, after a photograph of Salvador Dalí by Philippe Halsman (1944), by Van Vechten

The Library of Congress has a collection of approximately 1,400 photographs which it acquired in 1966 from Saul Mauriber (May 21, 1915 – February 12, 2003). There is also a collection of Van Vechten's photographs in the Prentiss Taylor collection in the Smithsonian's Archives of American Art, and a Van Vechten collection at Fisk University. The Museum of the City of New York's collection includes 2,174 of Van Vechten's photographs. Brandeis University's department of Archives & Special Collections holds 1,689 Carl Van Vechten portraits. Van Vechten also donated materials to Fisk University to form the George Gershwin Memorial Collection of Music and Musical Literature.

The Philadelphia Museum of Art currently holds one of the largest collection of photographs by Van Vechten in the United States. The collection began in 1949 when Van Vechten made a gift of sixty of his photographs to the museum. In 1965, Mark Lutz made a gift to the museum of more than 12,000 photographs by Van Vechten from his personal collection. Included in the collection are images from extensive portrait sessions with figures of the Harlem Renaissance, such as Langston Hughes, Ella Fitzgerald, Billie Holiday, Zora Neale Hurston, and Cab Calloway; artists such as Marcel Duchamp, Henri Matisse, Gaston Lachaise, Joan Miró, and Frida Kahlo; and countless other actors, musicians, and cultural figures. Also included in the Mark Lutz gift is an extensive body of photographs Van Vechten took at the 1939 New York World's Fair as well as a large number of photographs depicting scenes across Western Europe and Northern Africa taken during Van Vechten's travels in 1935–1936.

In 1980, concerned that Van Vechten's fragile 35 mm nitrate negatives were fast deteriorating, photographer Richard Benson, in conjunction with the Eakins Press Foundation, transformed 50 of the portraits into handmade gravure prints. The album 'O, Write My Name': American Portraits, Harlem Heroes was completed in 1983. That year, the National Endowment for the Arts transferred the Eakins Press Foundation's prototype albums to the permanent collection of the Smithsonian American Art Museum.

The National Portrait Gallery, London, holds 17 of Van Vechten's portraits of leading creative talents of his era.

More than 3,000 Van Vechten portraits, most of which come from the Library of Congress collection, are included in Wikimedia Commons. His public domain photographs illustrate countless Wikipedia entries on mid-century (mostly American) notables. See examples in the gallery below.

- Carl Van Vechten Papers. Yale Collection of American Literature, Beinecke Rare Book and Manuscript Library.
- Carl Van Vechten Papers Relating to African American Arts and Letters. James Weldon Johnson Collection in the Yale Collection of American Literature, Beinecke Rare Book and Manuscript Library.
- Guide to the Carl Van Vechten papers, 1833–1965. Manuscripts and Archives, New York Public Library.
- Carl Van Vechten collection of papers, 1911–1964. Berg Collection of English and American Literature, New York Public Library.
- Carl Van Vechten theatre photographs, 1932–1943, held by the Billy Rose Theatre Division at the New York Public Library for the Performing Arts
- Carl Van Vechten photographs, 1932–1964 at Brandeis University's Archives & Special Collections, contains 1,689 Van Vechten portraits.
- Images by Carl Van Vechten in the Collections of the Museum of the City of New York
- Living Portraits: Carl Van Vechten's Color Photographs of African Americans, 1939–1964, Beinecke Rare Book and Manuscript Library at Yale University, features a searchable database of 1,884 rare color Kodachrome slides
- Portraits by Carl Van Vechten at the National Portrait Gallery, London
- Creative Americans: Portraits by Carl Van Vechten at the Library of Congress
- Carl Van Vechten's Portraits from the collection of the Beinecke Rare Book and Manuscript Library at Yale University: more than 9,000 black-and-white prints
- Postcards from Manhattan: The Portrait Photography of Carl Van Vechten at Marquette University: hundreds of portrait postcards sent by Van Vechten to Wisconsin artist Karl Priebe from 1946 to 1956.
- Guide to the Carl Van Vechten Photograph Collection 1932–1956 at the University of Chicago Special Collections Research Center
- The Rose McClendon Memorial Collection of Photographs of Celebrated Negroes by Carl Van Vechten at the Moorland-Spingarn Research Center at Howard University, Washington, D.C.
- Carl Van Vechten Papers at the Moorland-Spingarn Research Center at Howard University, Washington, D.C.

== Gallery ==
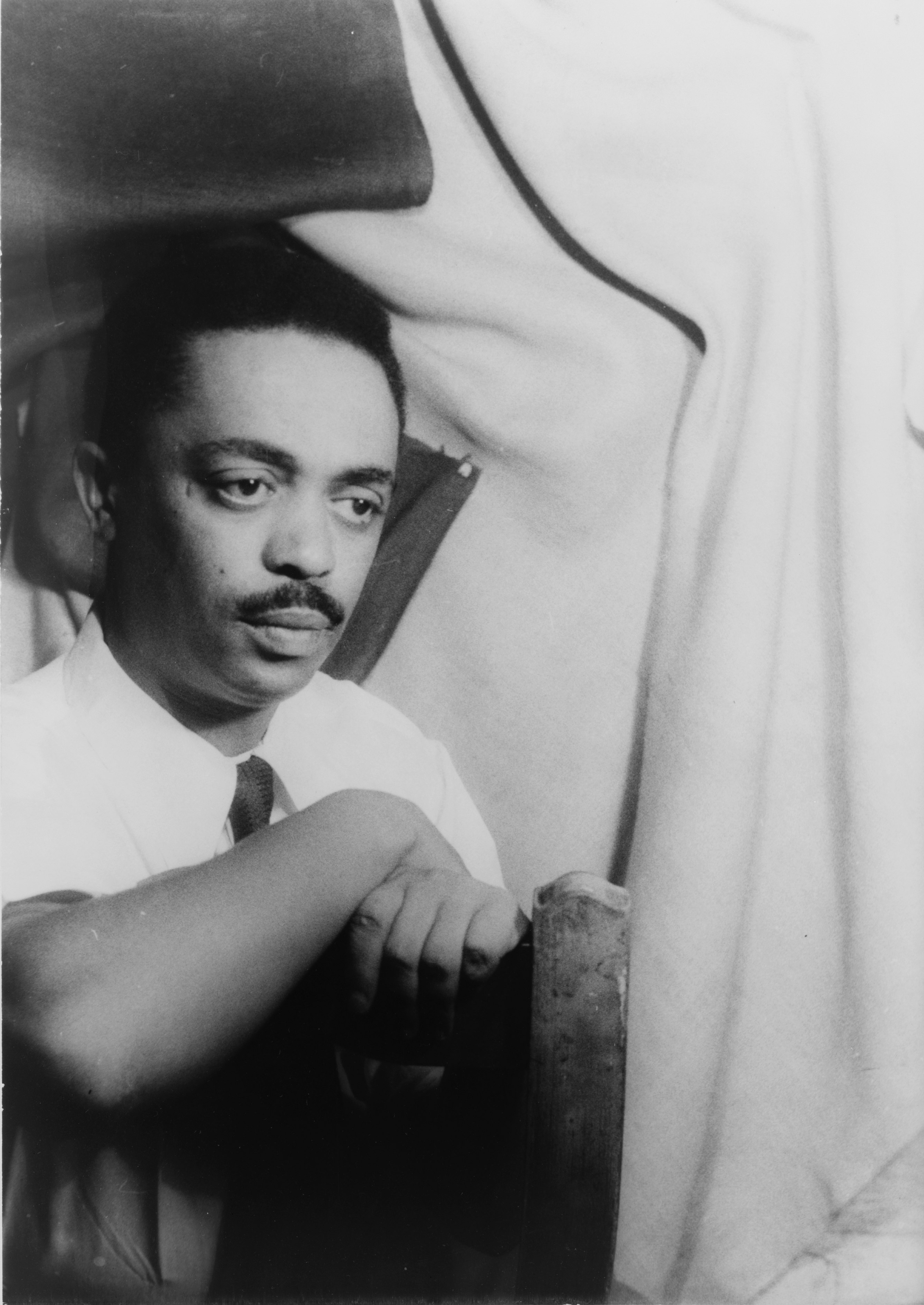
Peter Abrahams, 1955

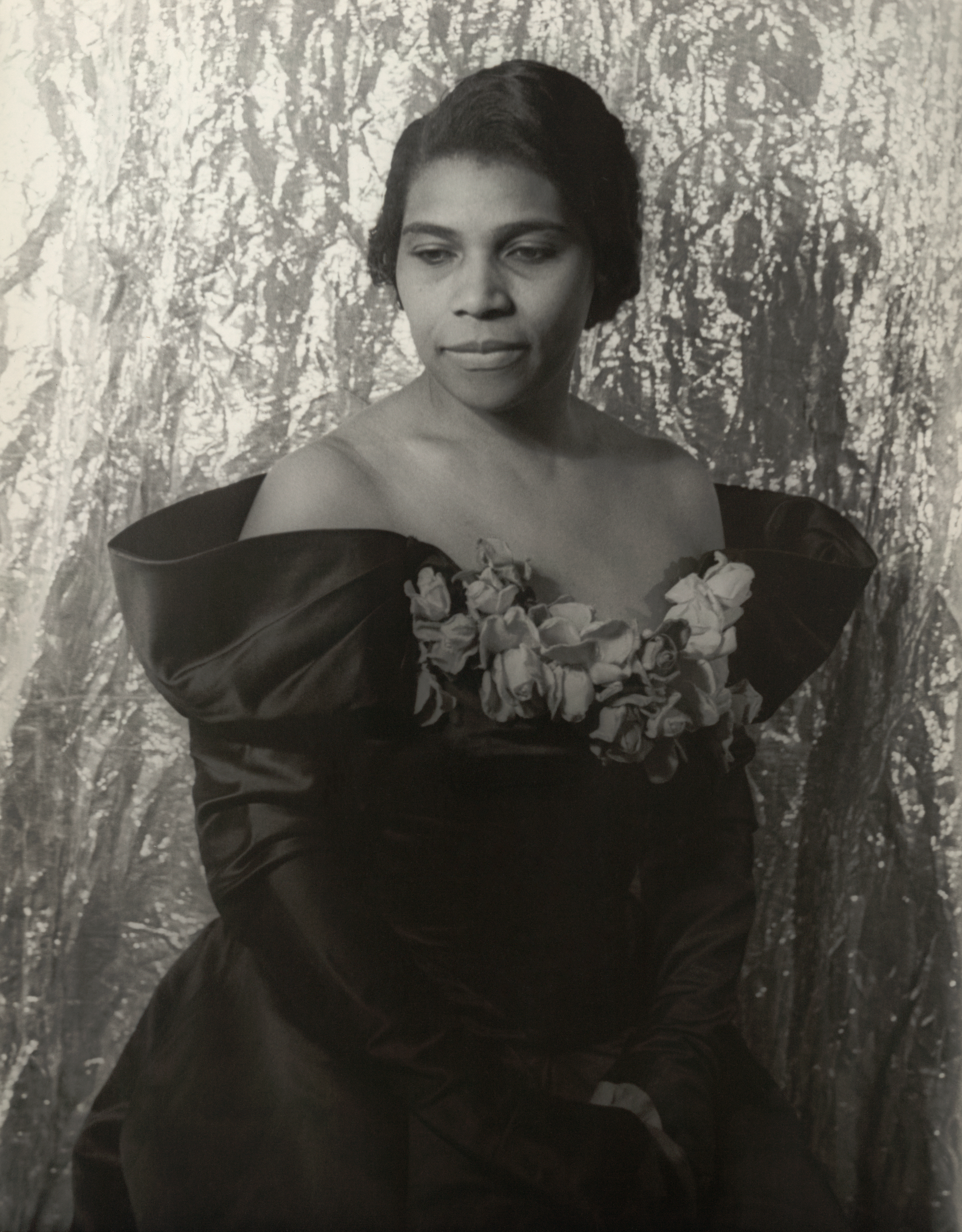
Marian Anderson, 1940

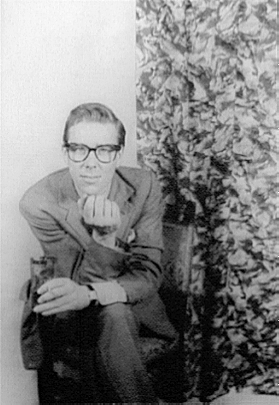
Antony Armstrong-Jones, 1958

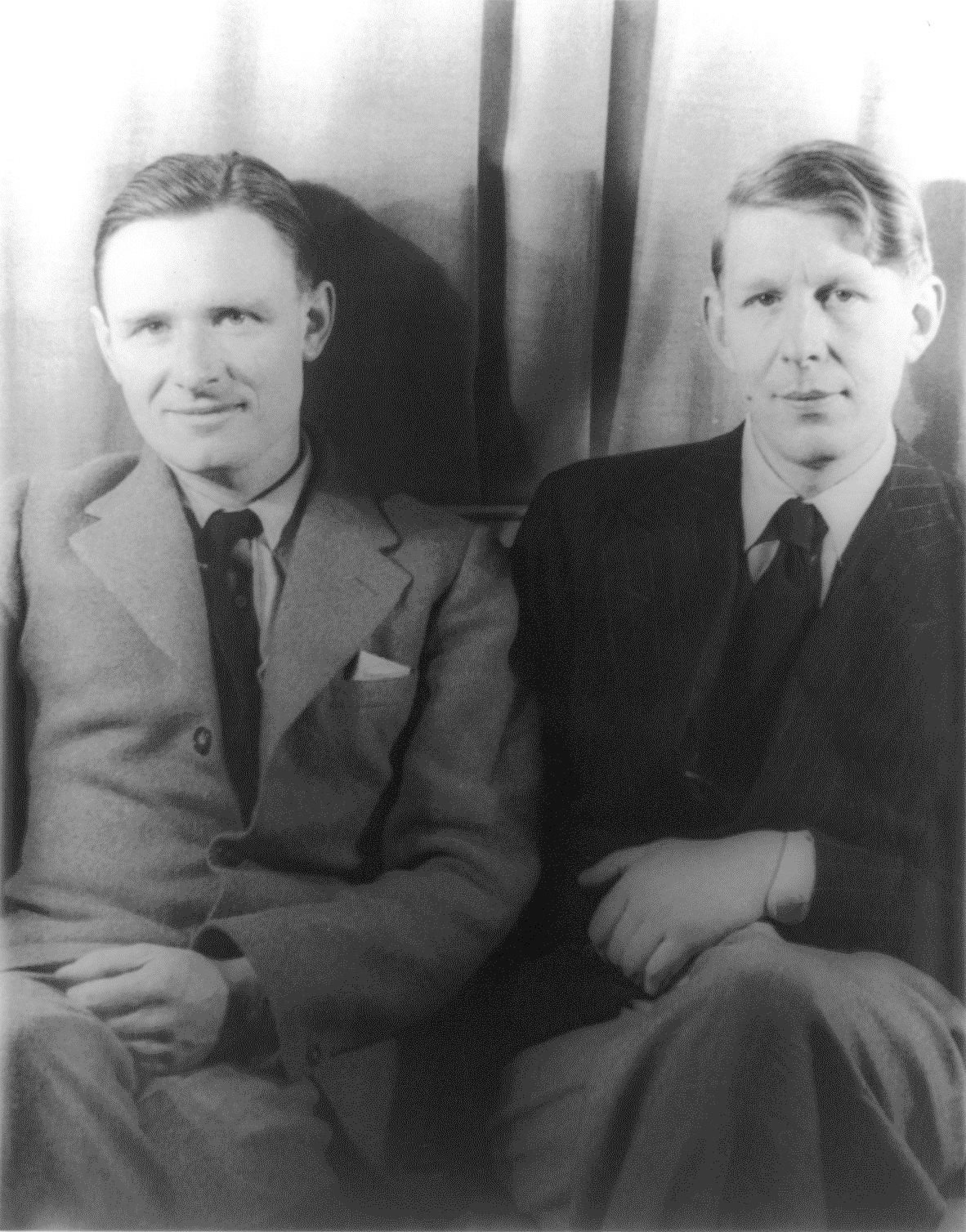
Christopher Isherwood and W. H. Auden, 1939

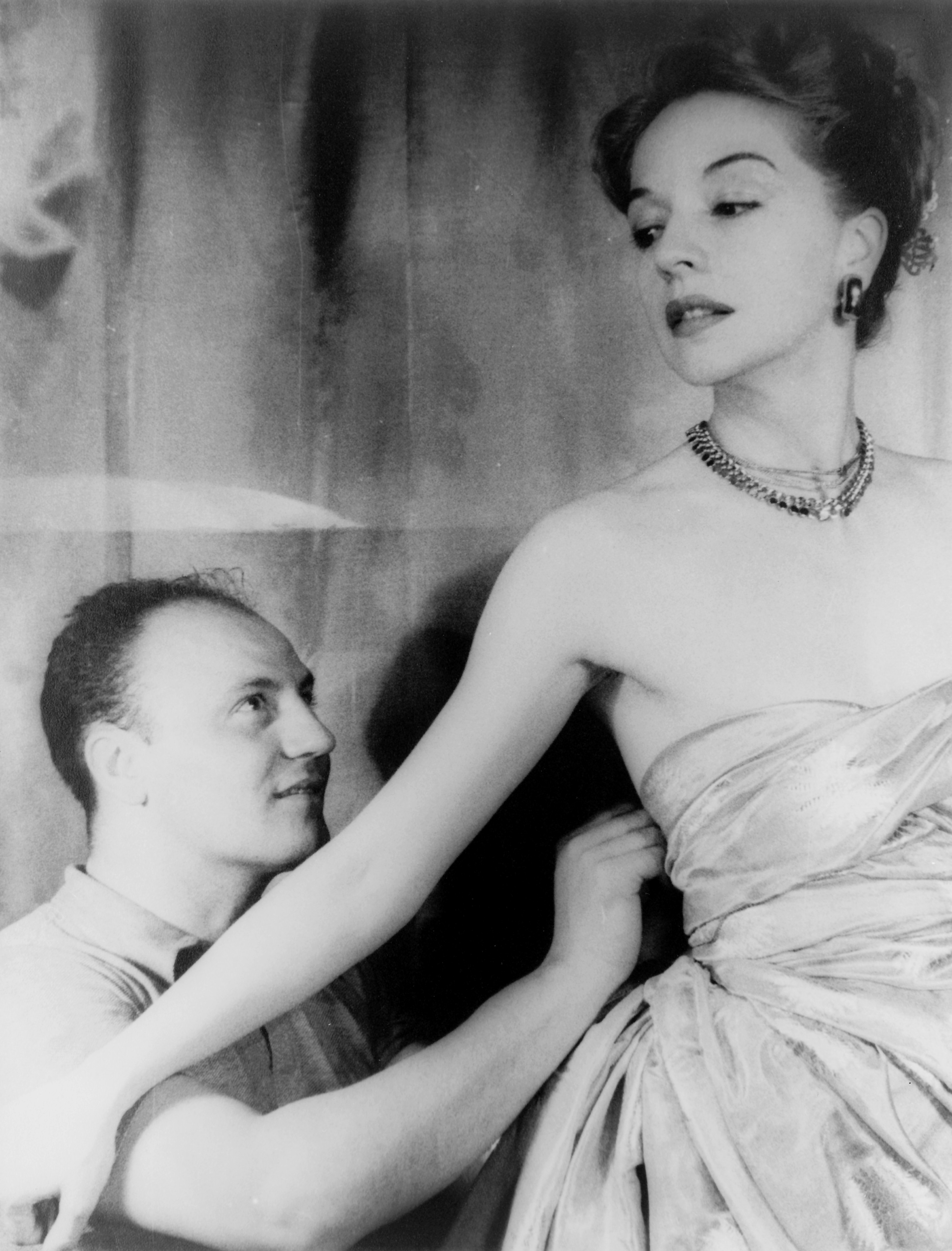
Pierre Balmain and Ruth Ford, 1947

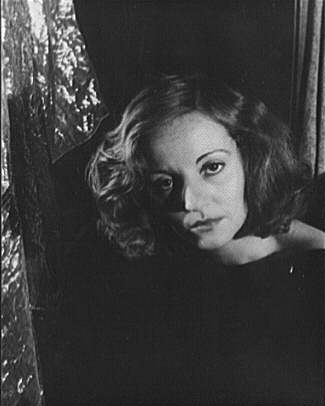
Tallulah Bankhead, 1934

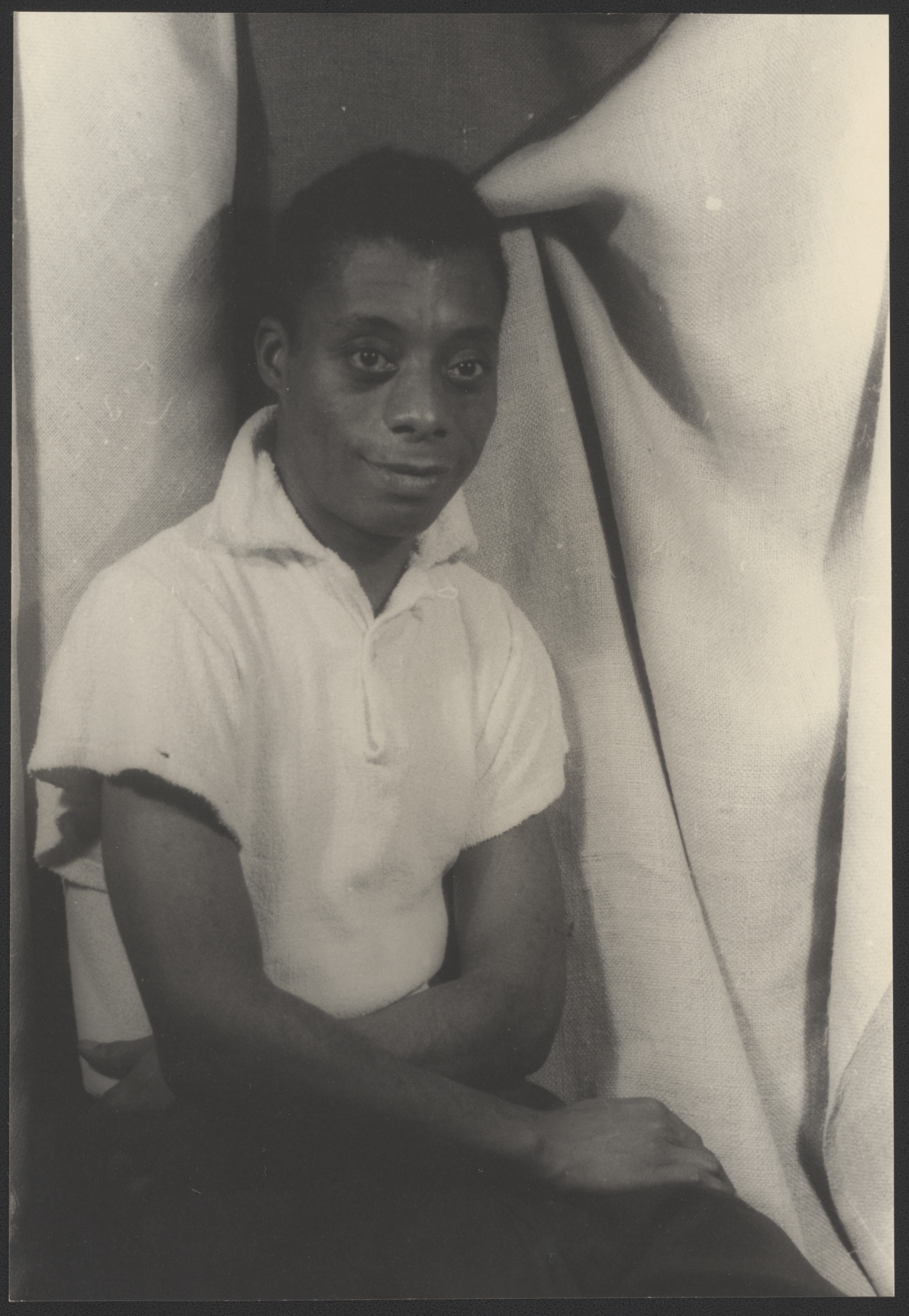
James Baldwin, 1955

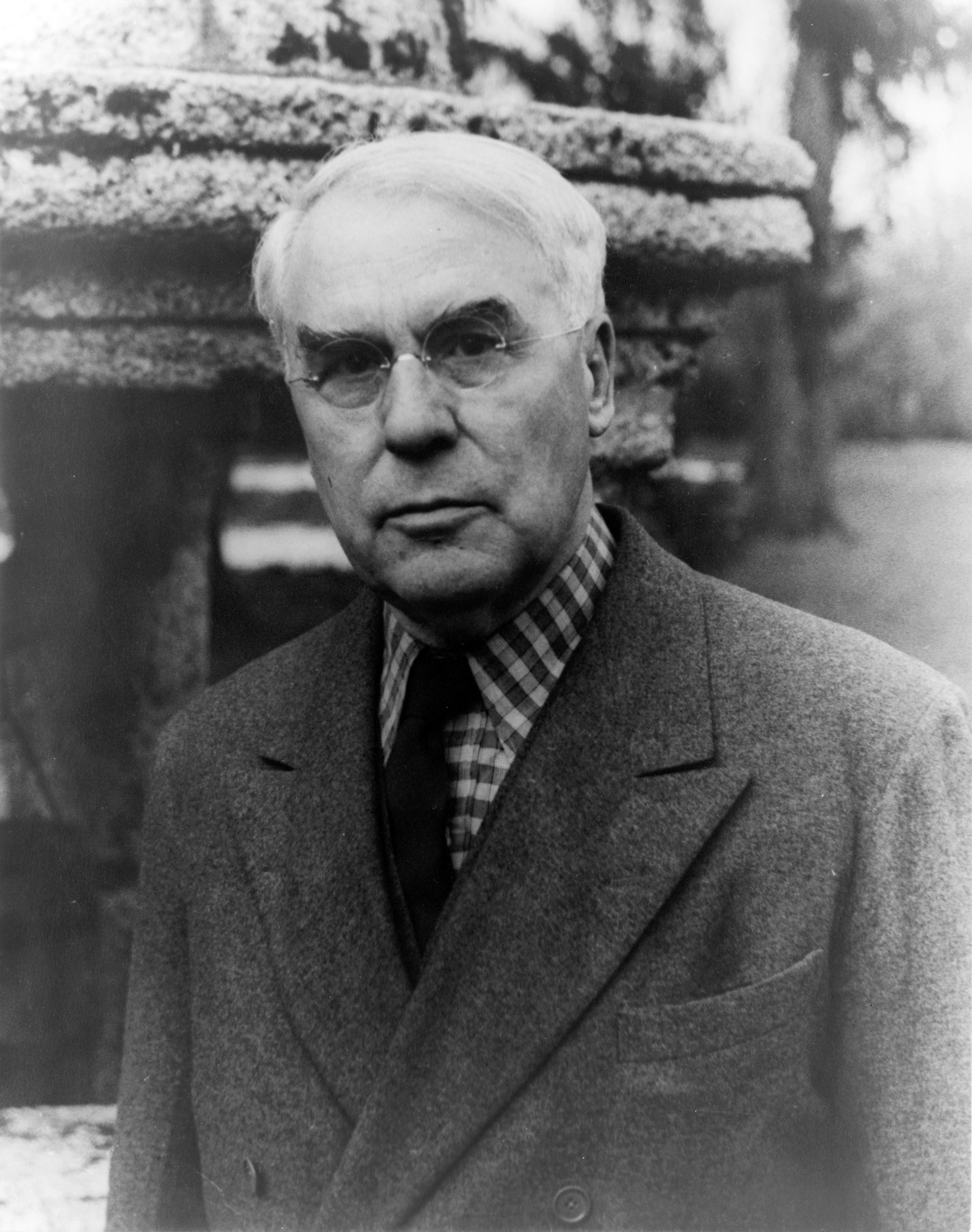
Albert C. Barnes, 1940

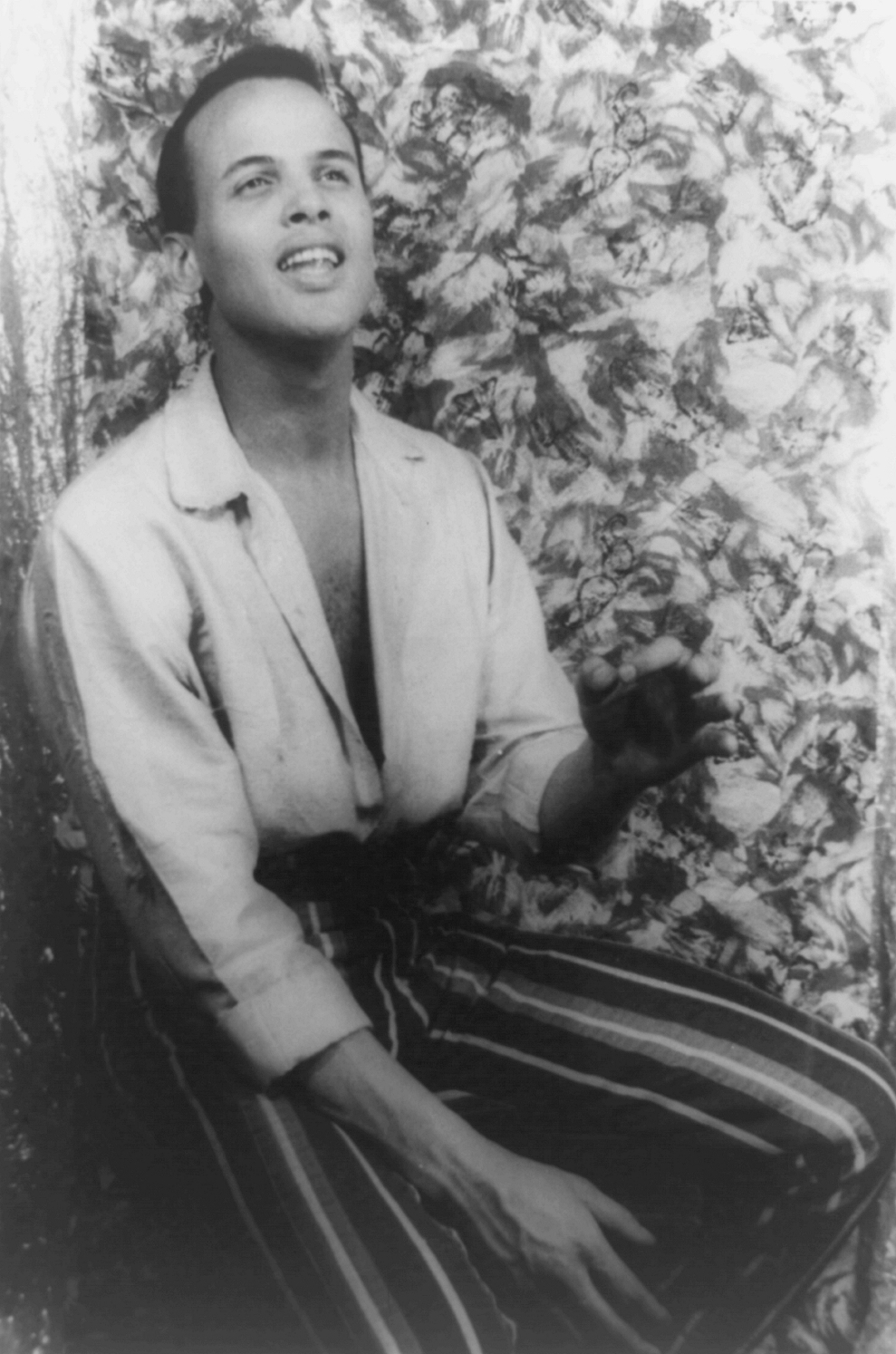
Harry Belafonte, 1954

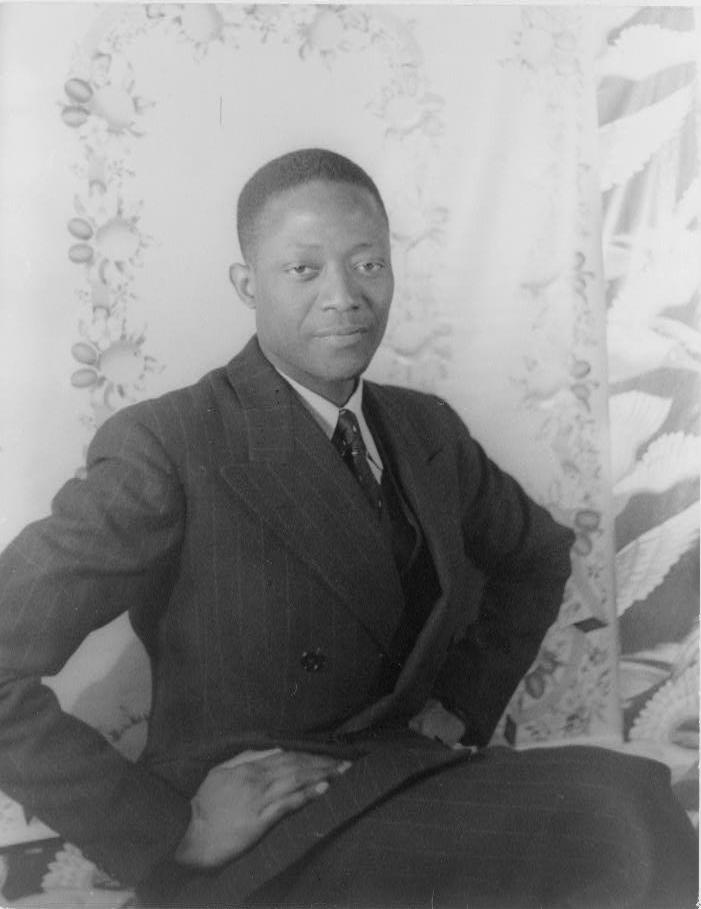
Féral Benga, 1937

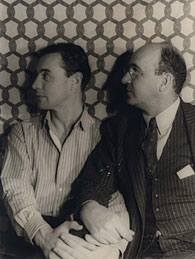
Robert Hunt and Witter Bynner

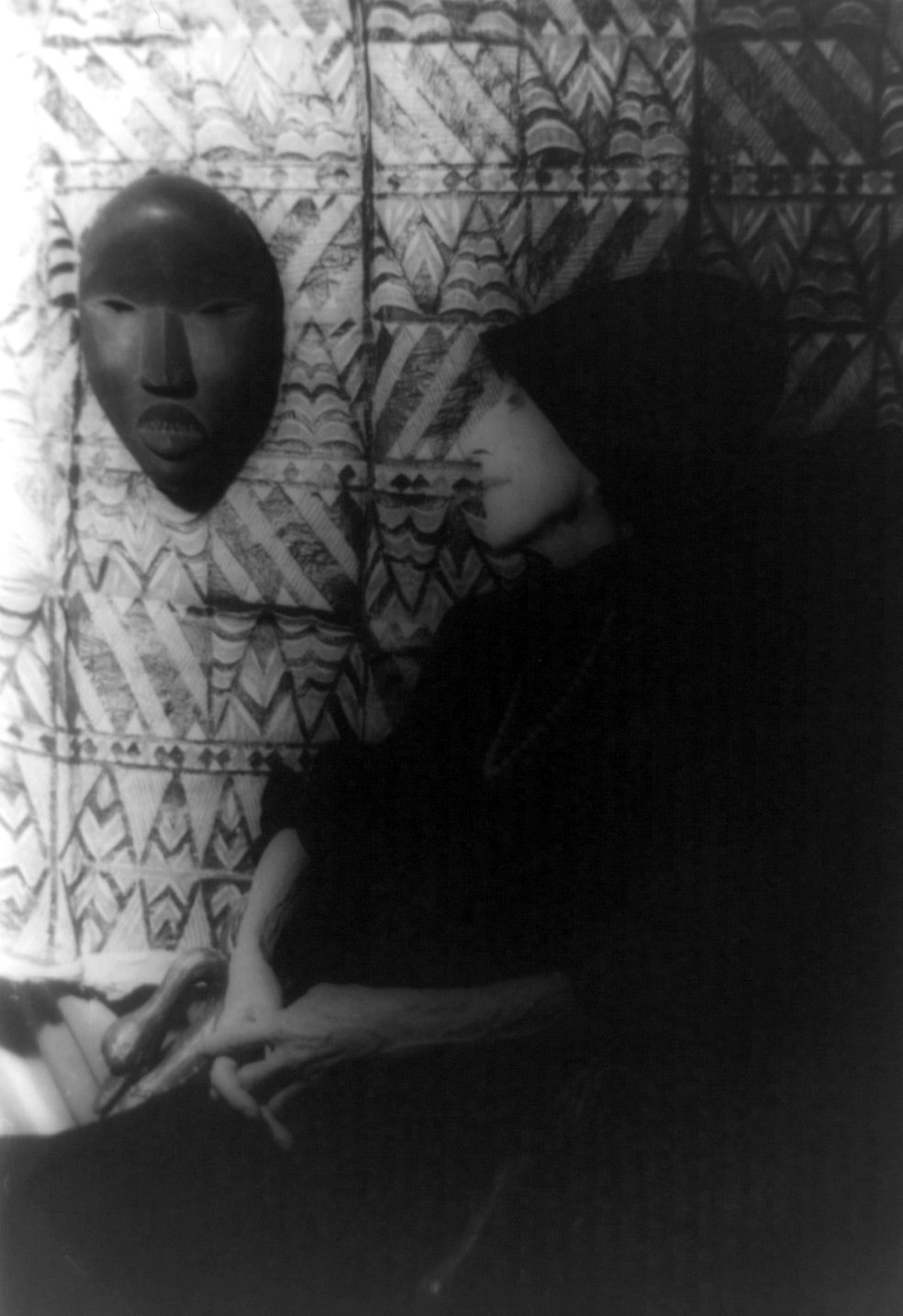
Karen von Blixen-Finecke, 1959

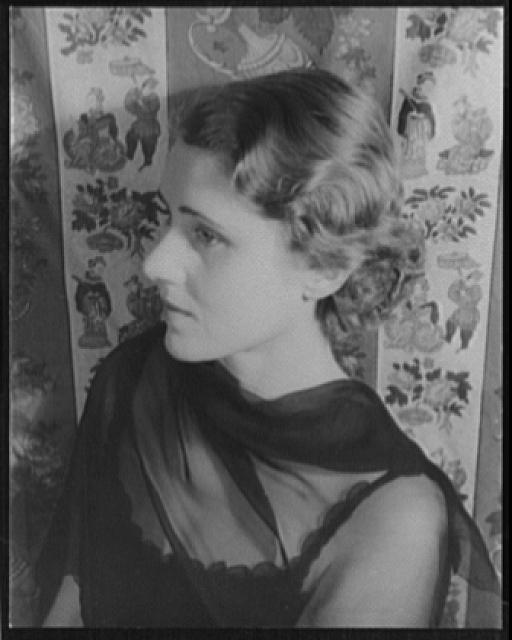
Clare Boothe Luce, 1932

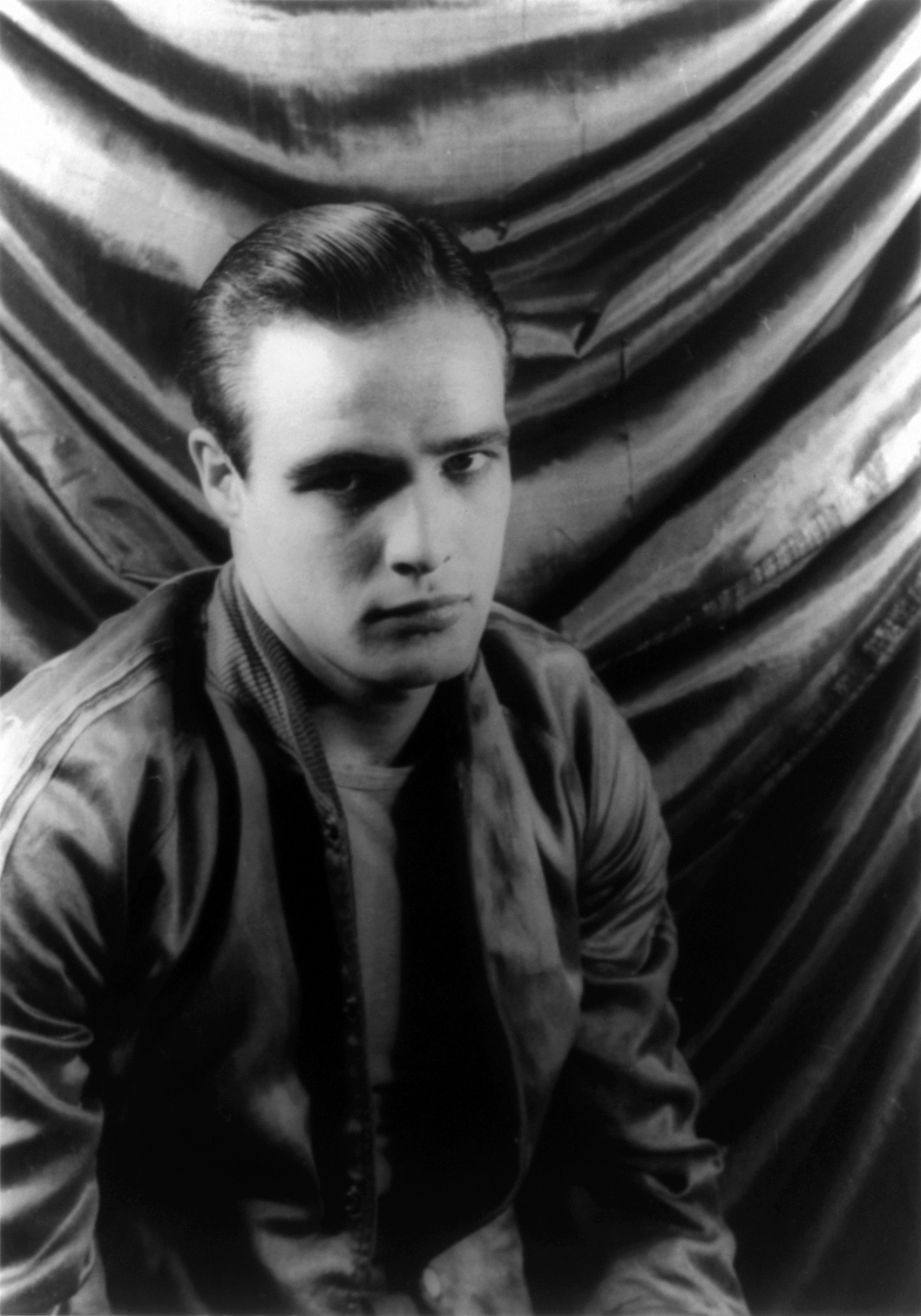
Marlon Brando, 1948

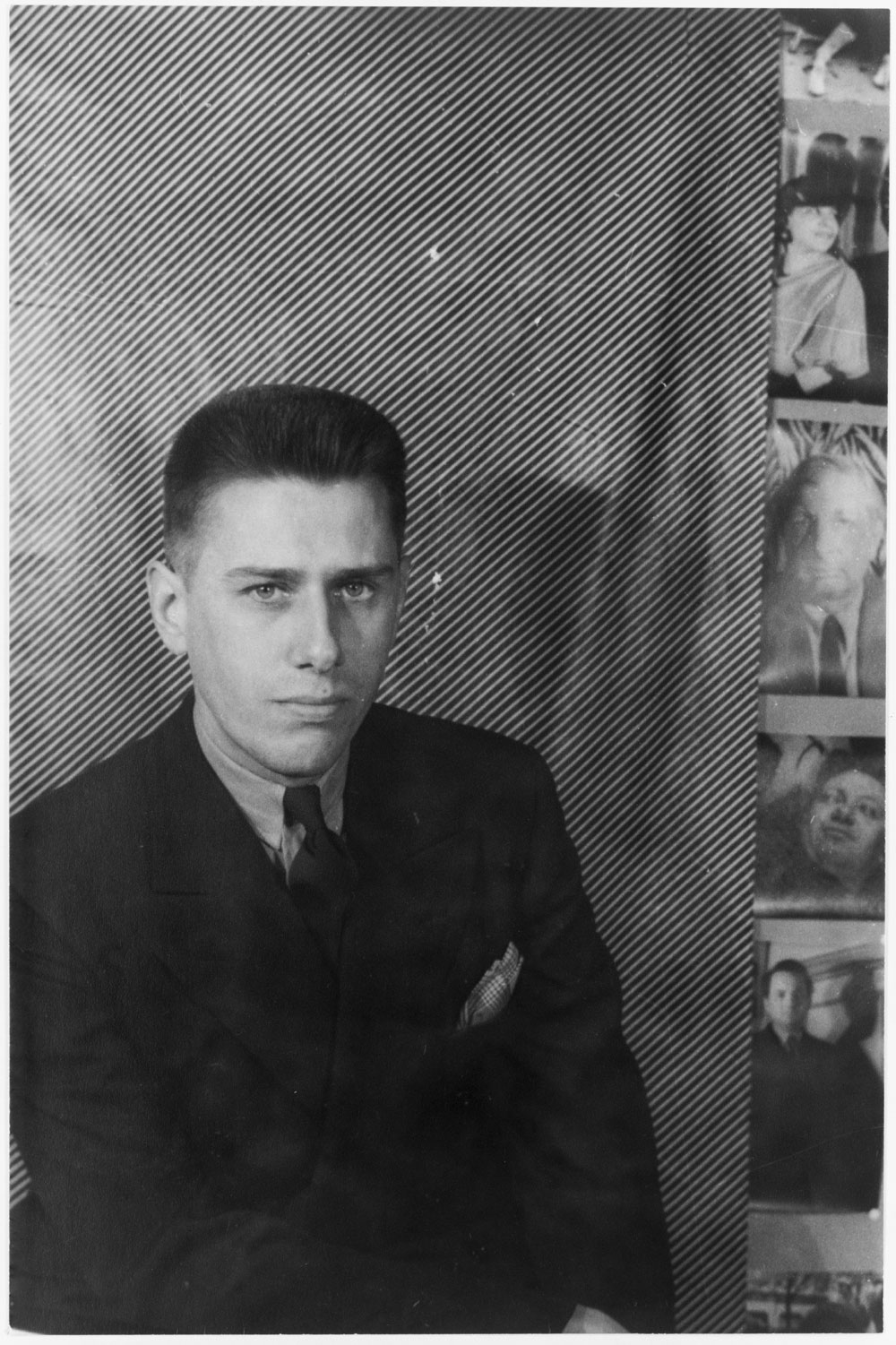
Paul Cadmus, 1937

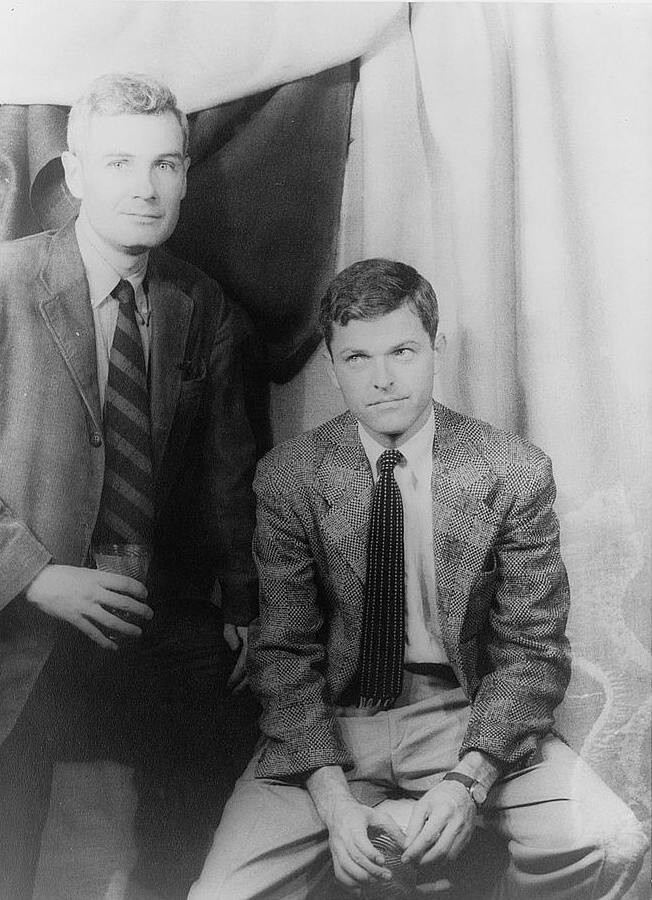
Donald Windham and Sandy Campbell, 1955

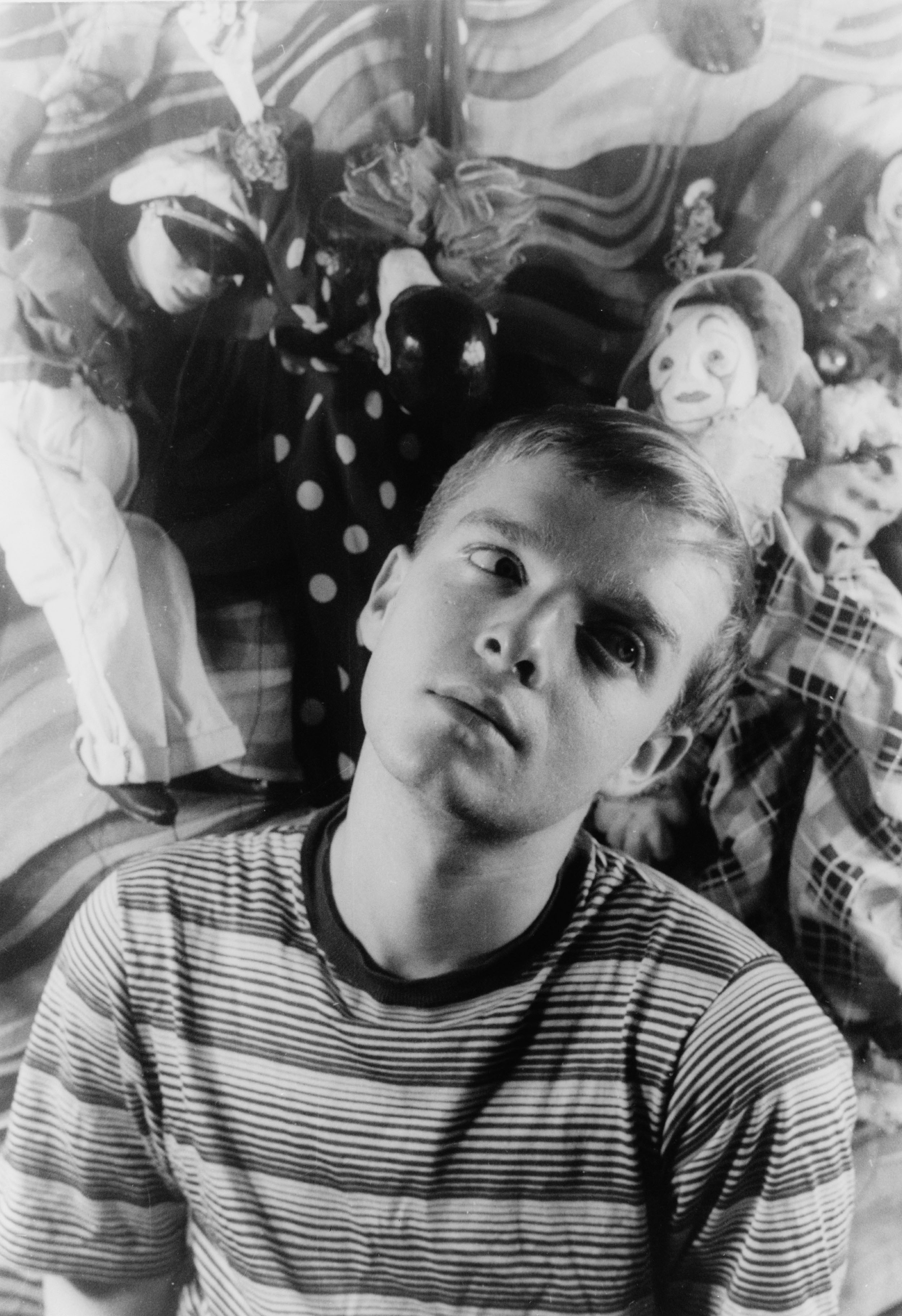
Truman Capote, 1948

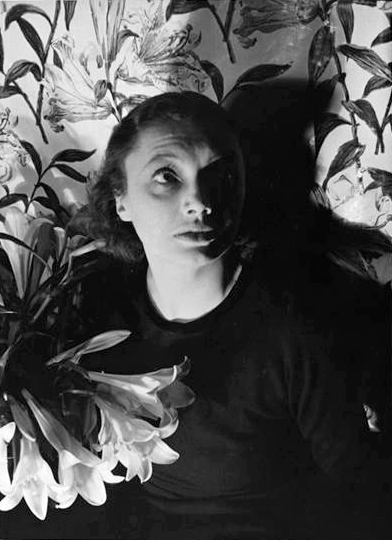
Katharine Cornell, 1933

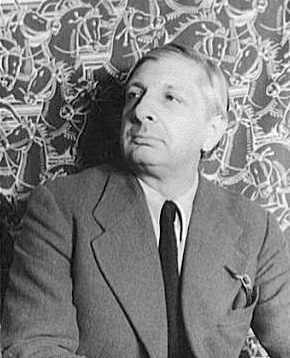
Giorgio de Chirico, 1936

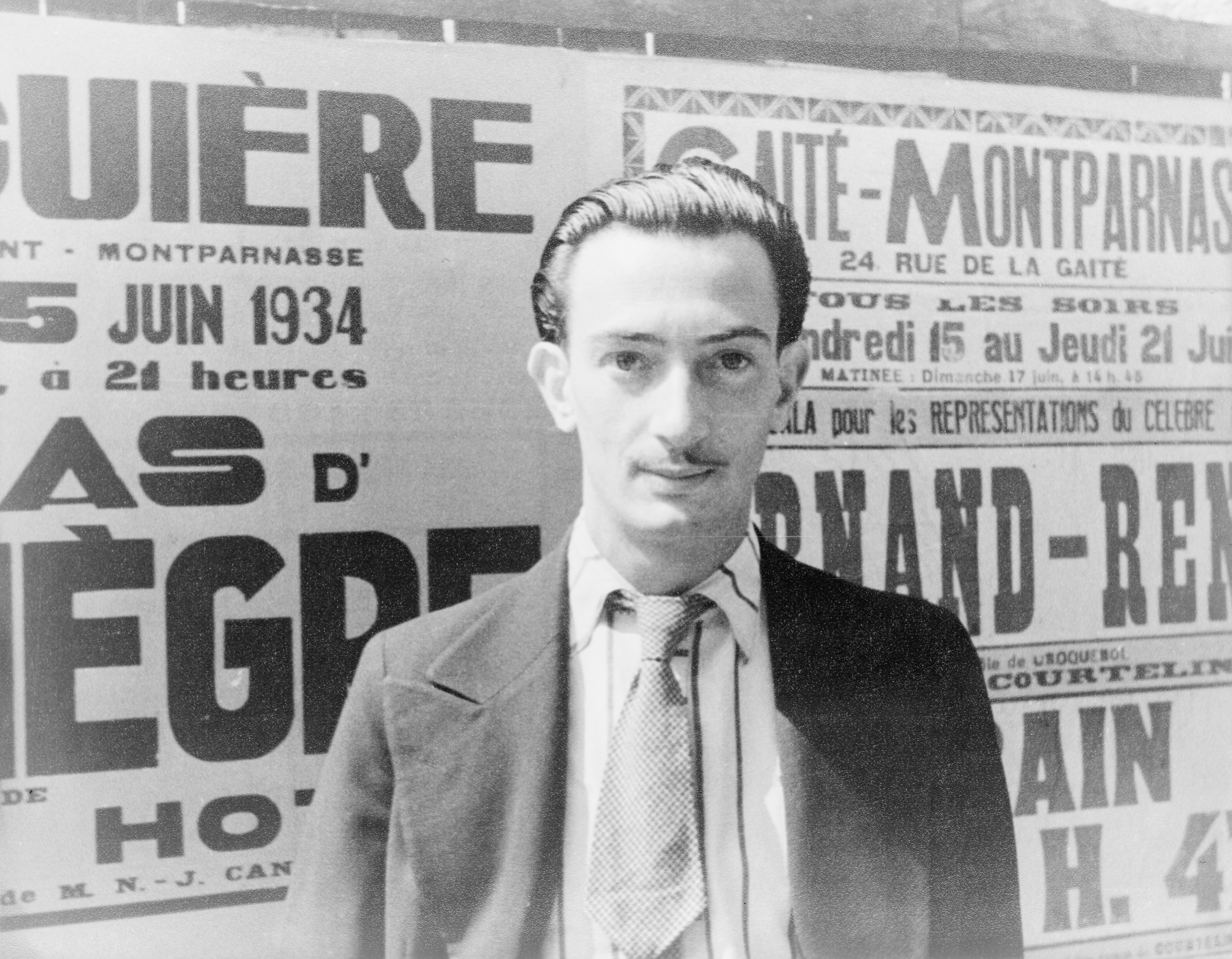
Salvador Dalí, 1934

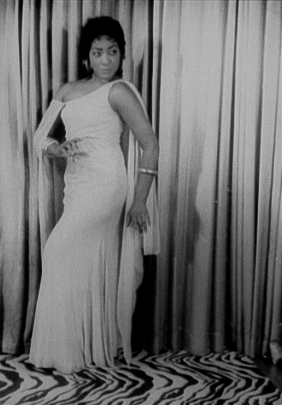
Gloria Davy, 1958

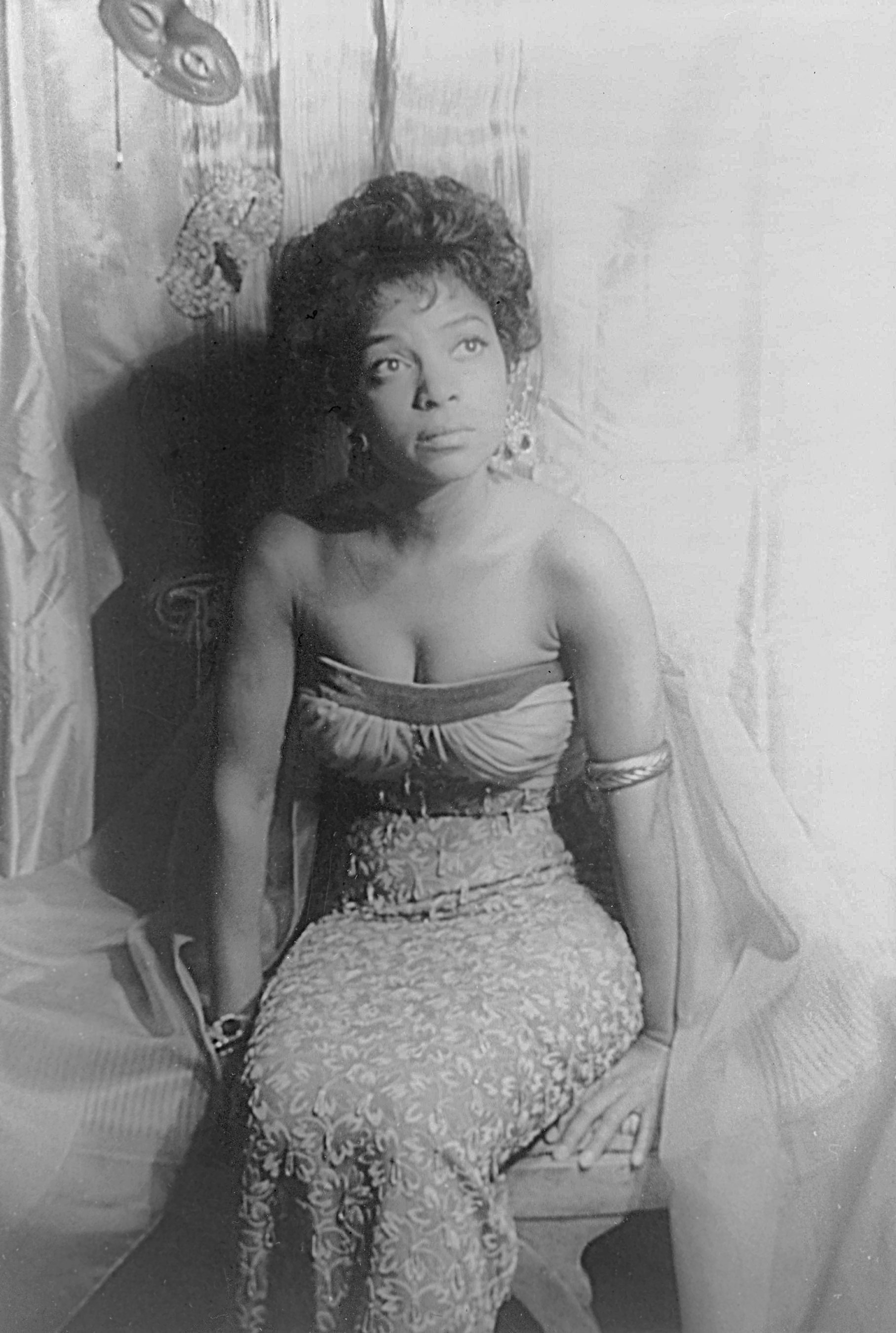
Ruby Dee, 1962

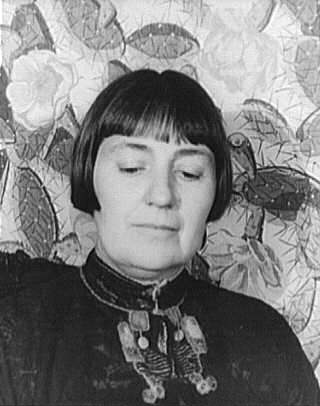
Mabel Dodge Luhan, 1934

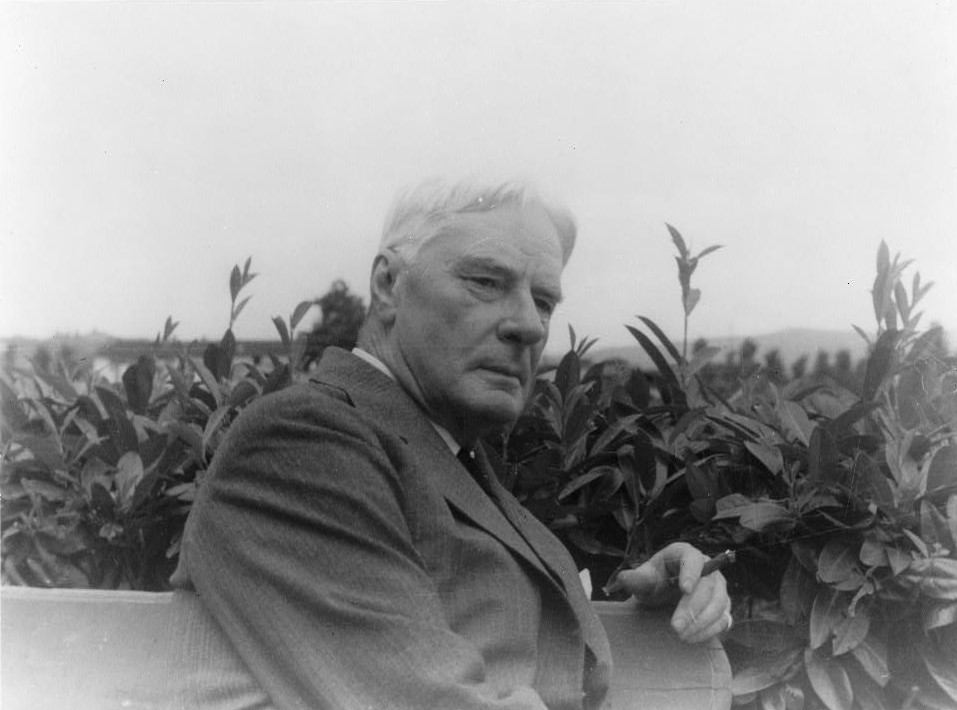
Norman Douglas, 1935

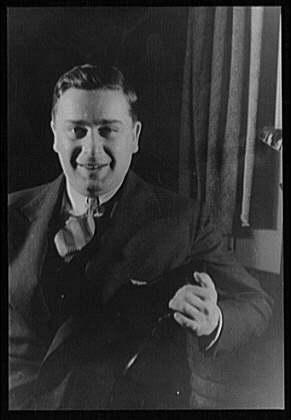
John Van Druten, 1932

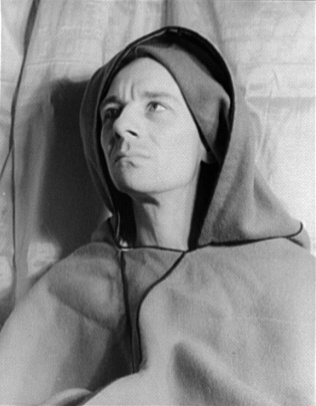
John Gielgud as Richard II, 1936

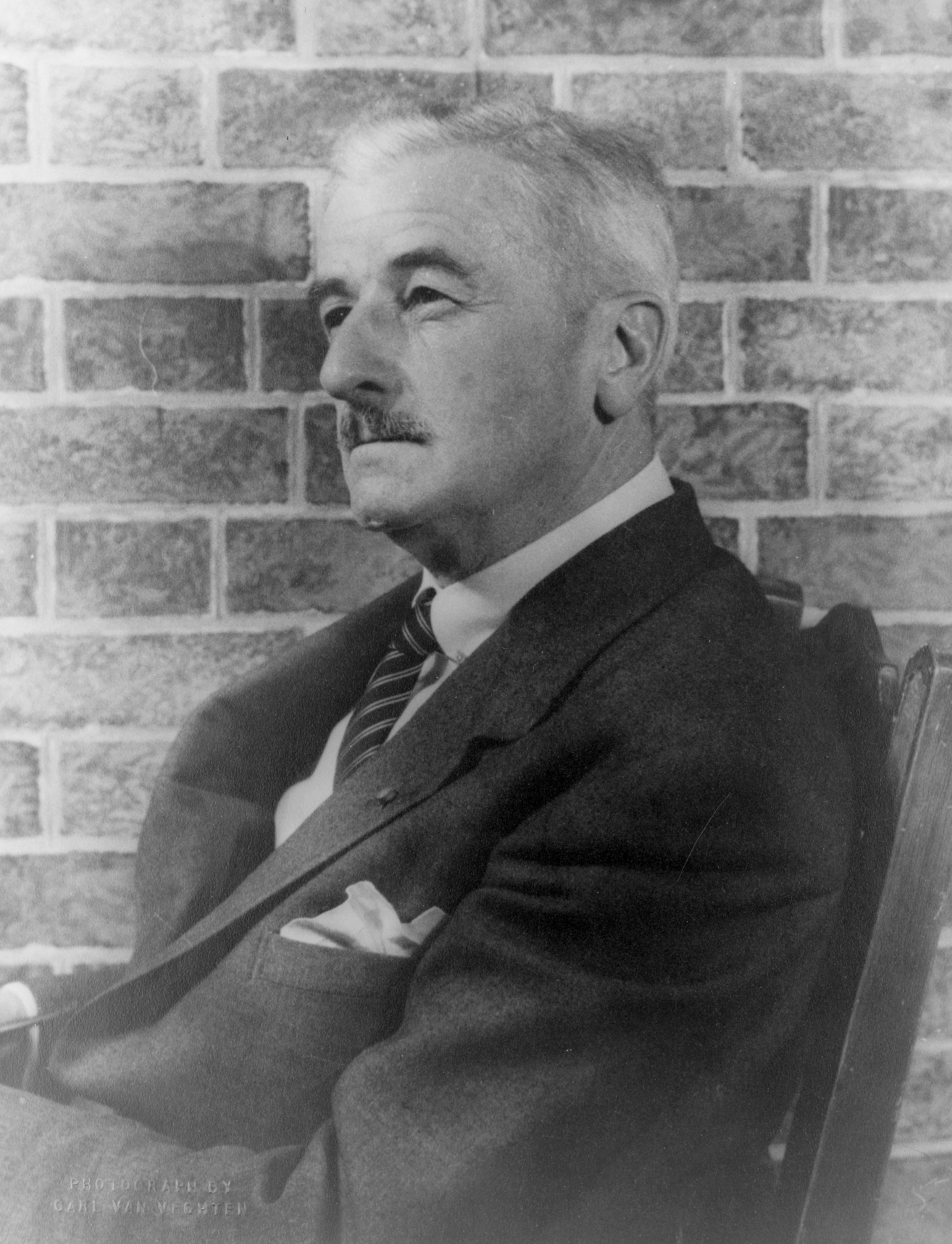
William Faulkner, 1954

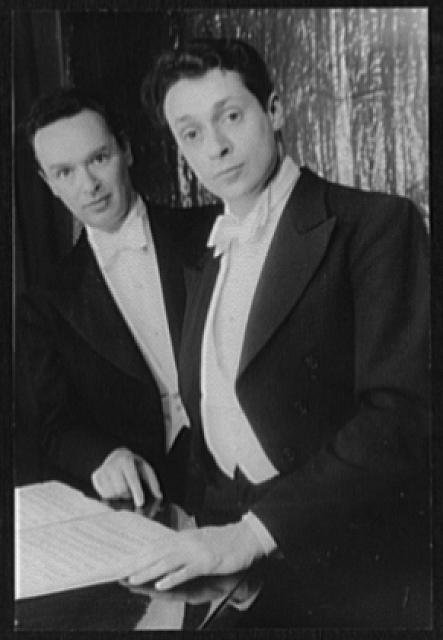
Arthur Gold and Robert Fizdale, 1952

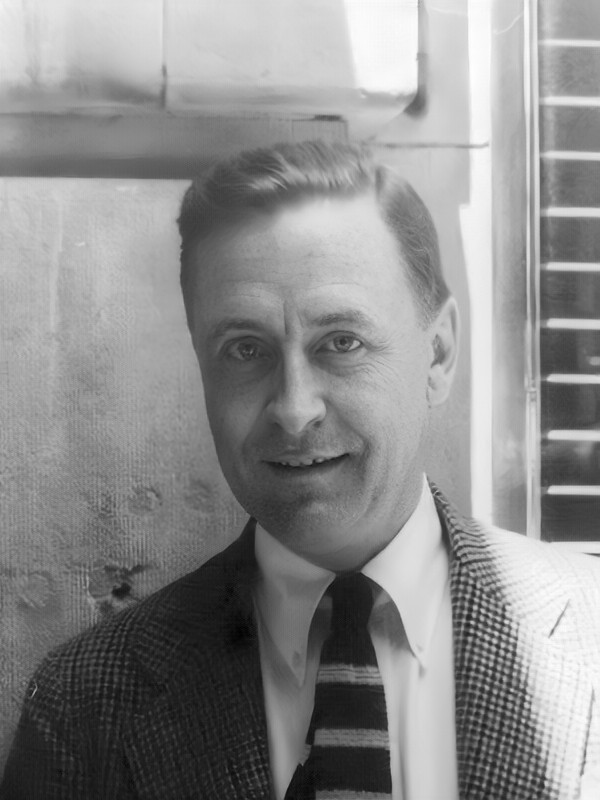
F. Scott Fitzgerald, 1937

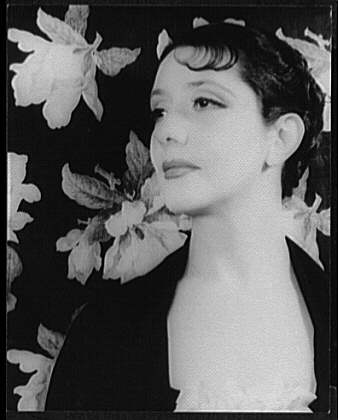
Lynn Fontanne, 1932

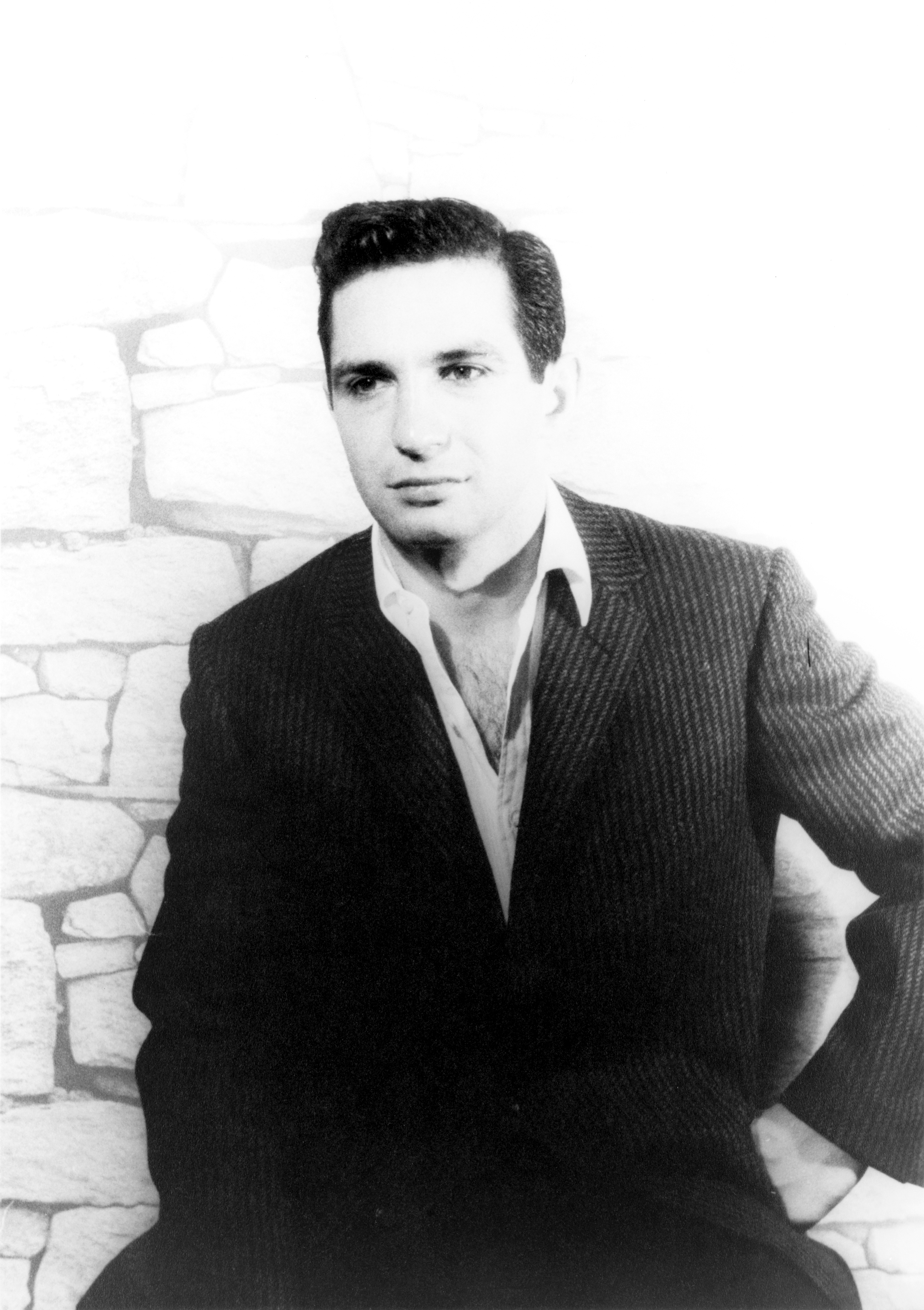
Ben Gazzara, 1955

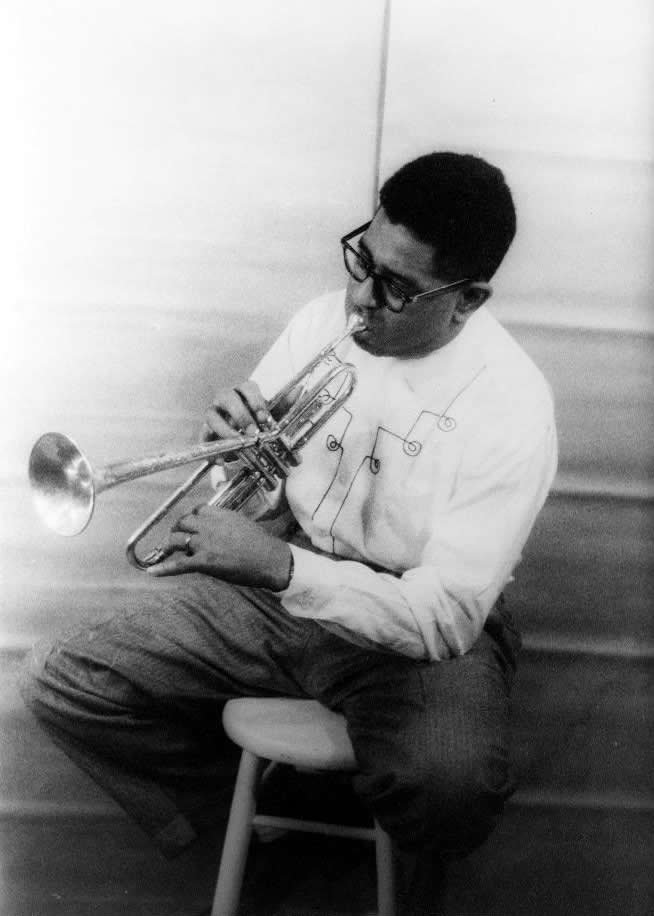
Dizzy Gillespie, 1955

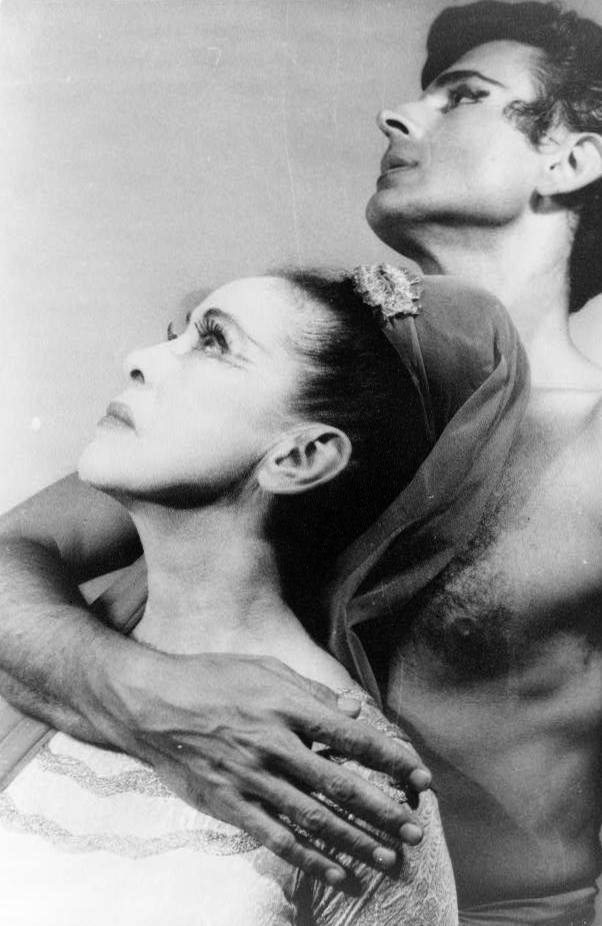
Martha Graham and Bertram Ross, 1961

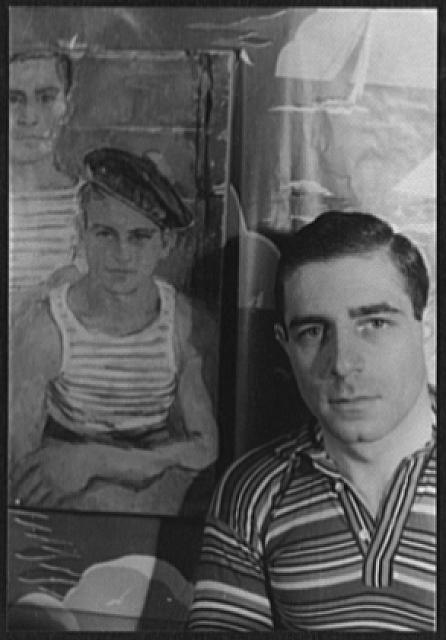
Maurice Grosser, 1935

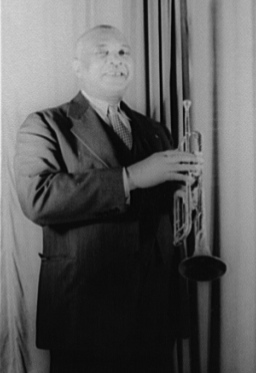
W. C. Handy, 1941

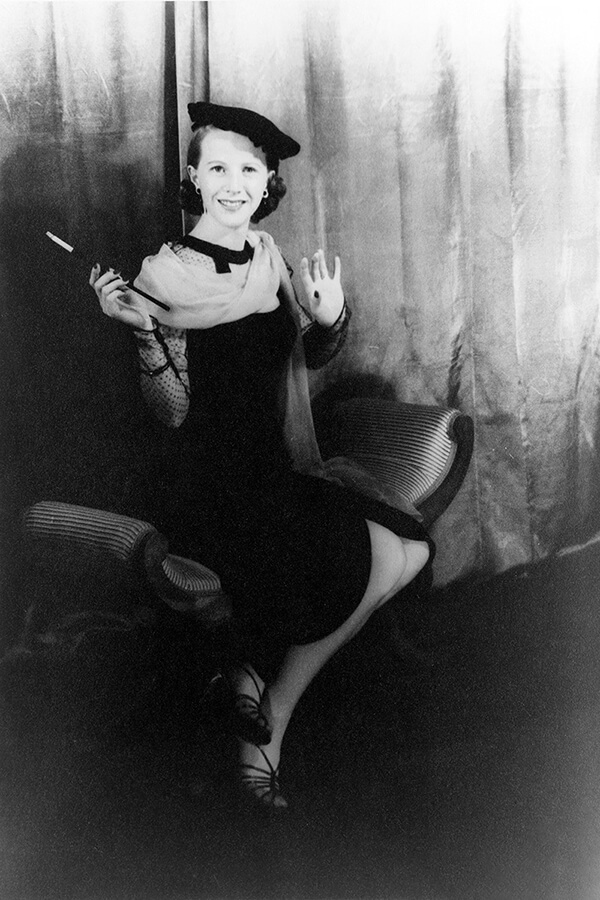
Julie Harris, 1952

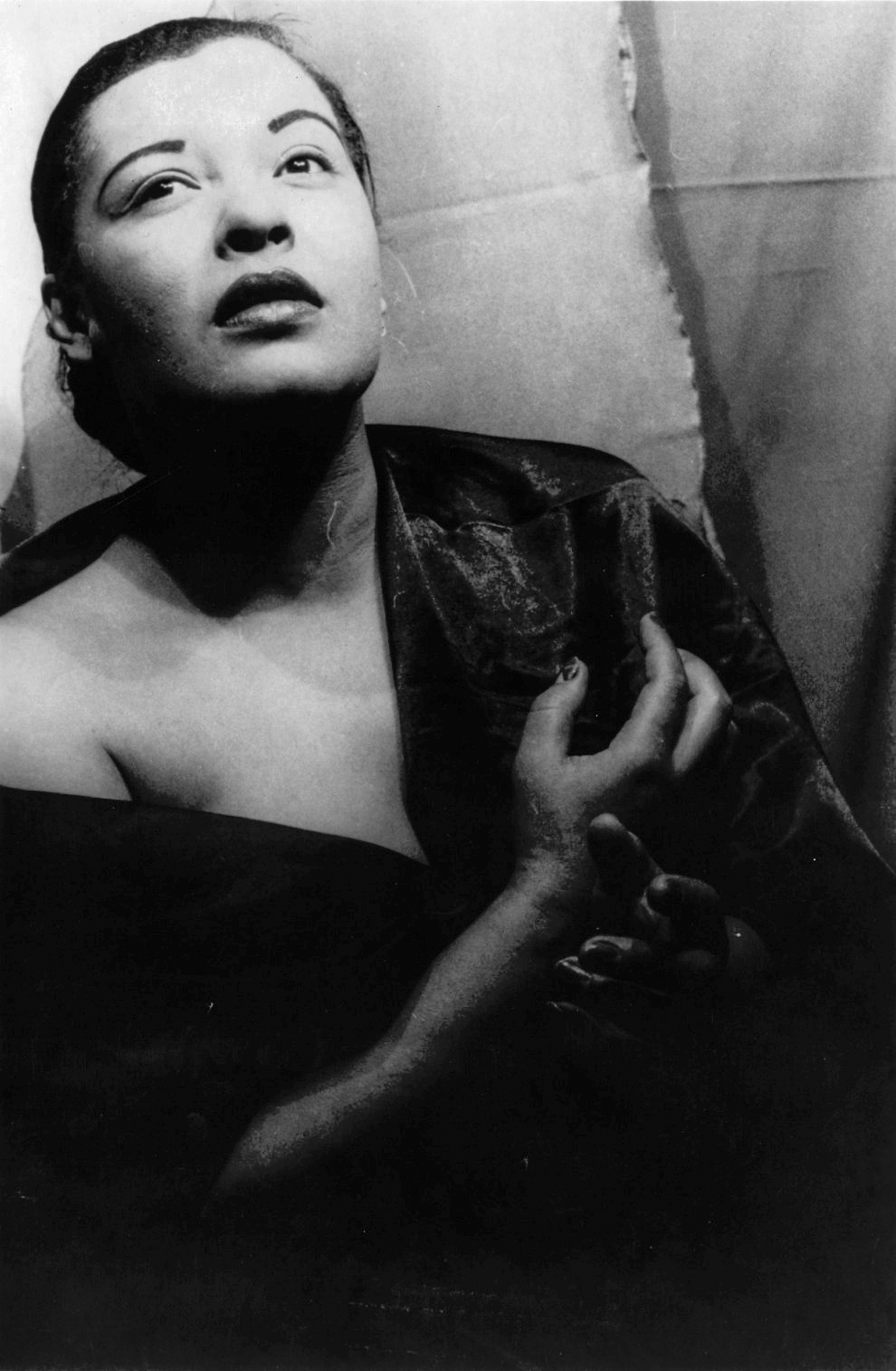
Billie Holiday, 1949

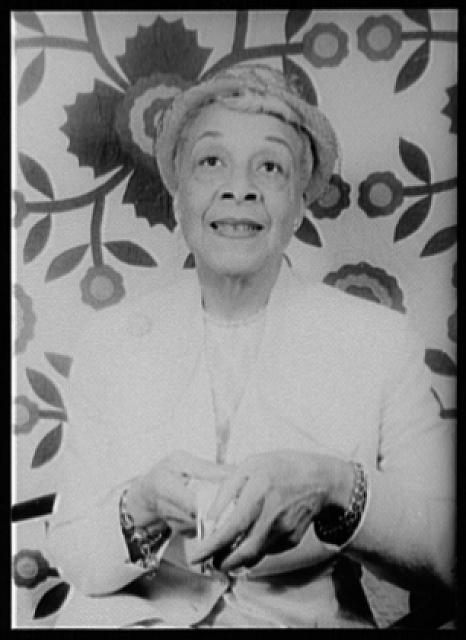
Nora Holt, 1955

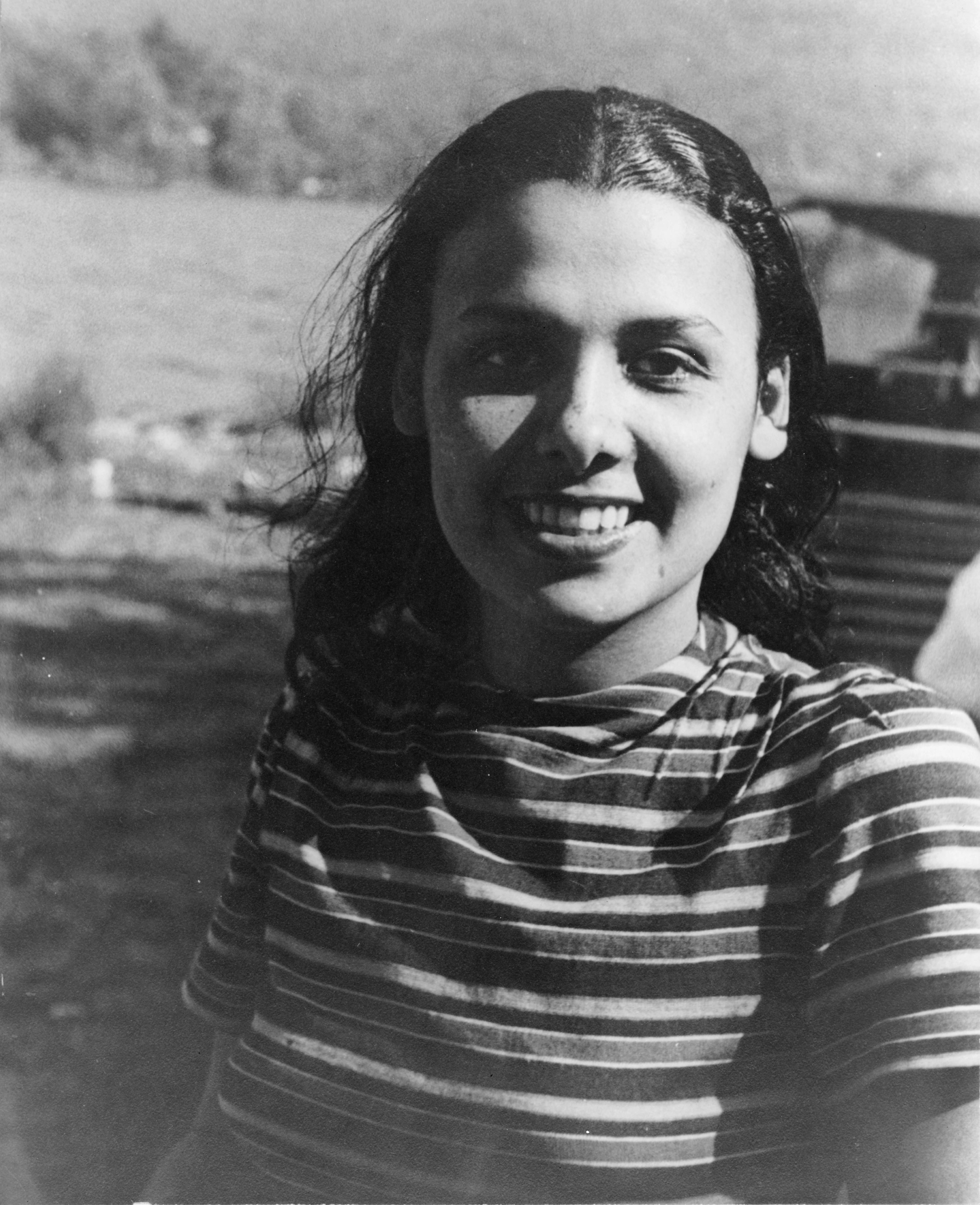
Lena Horne, 1941

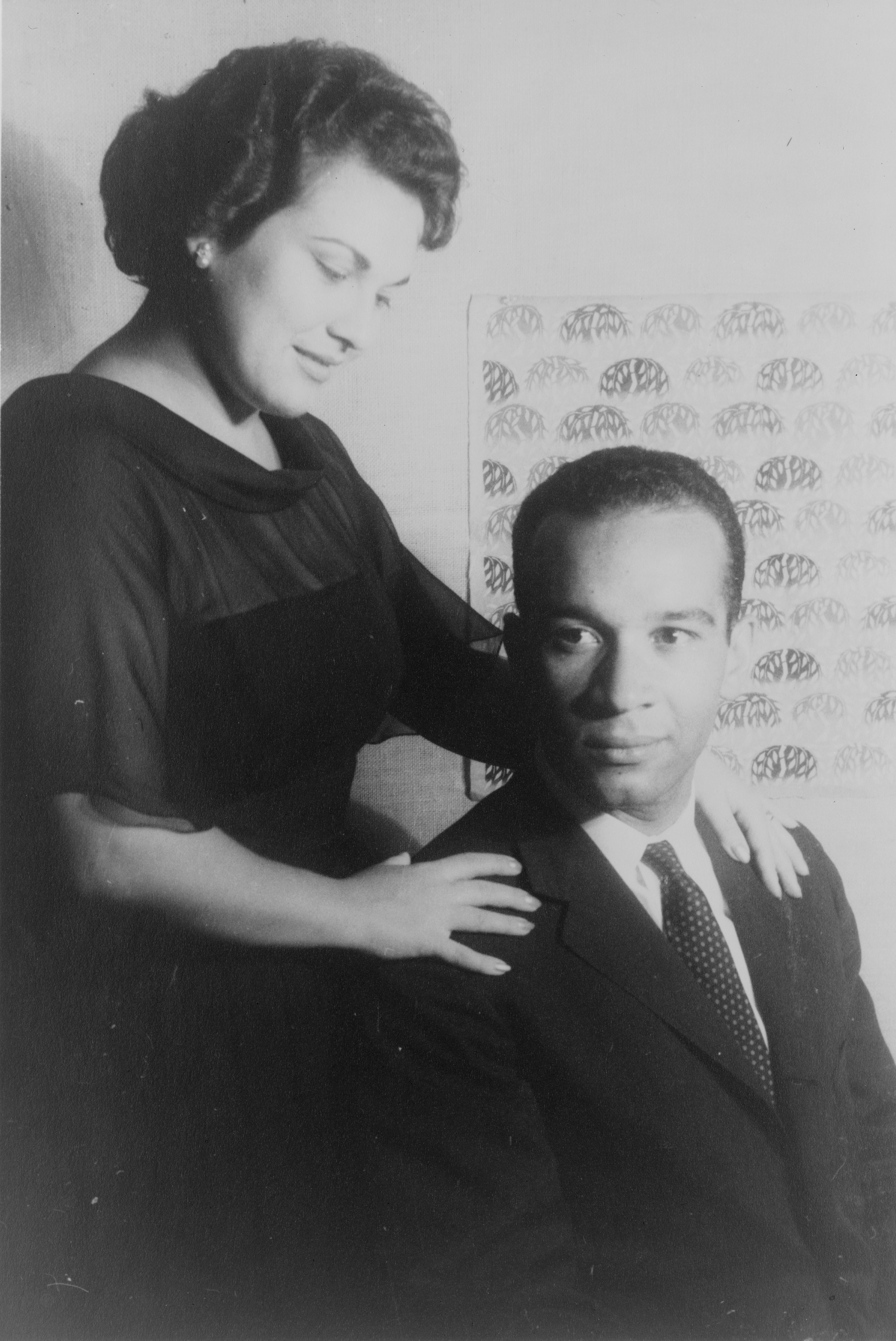
Marilyn Horne and Henry Lewis, 1961

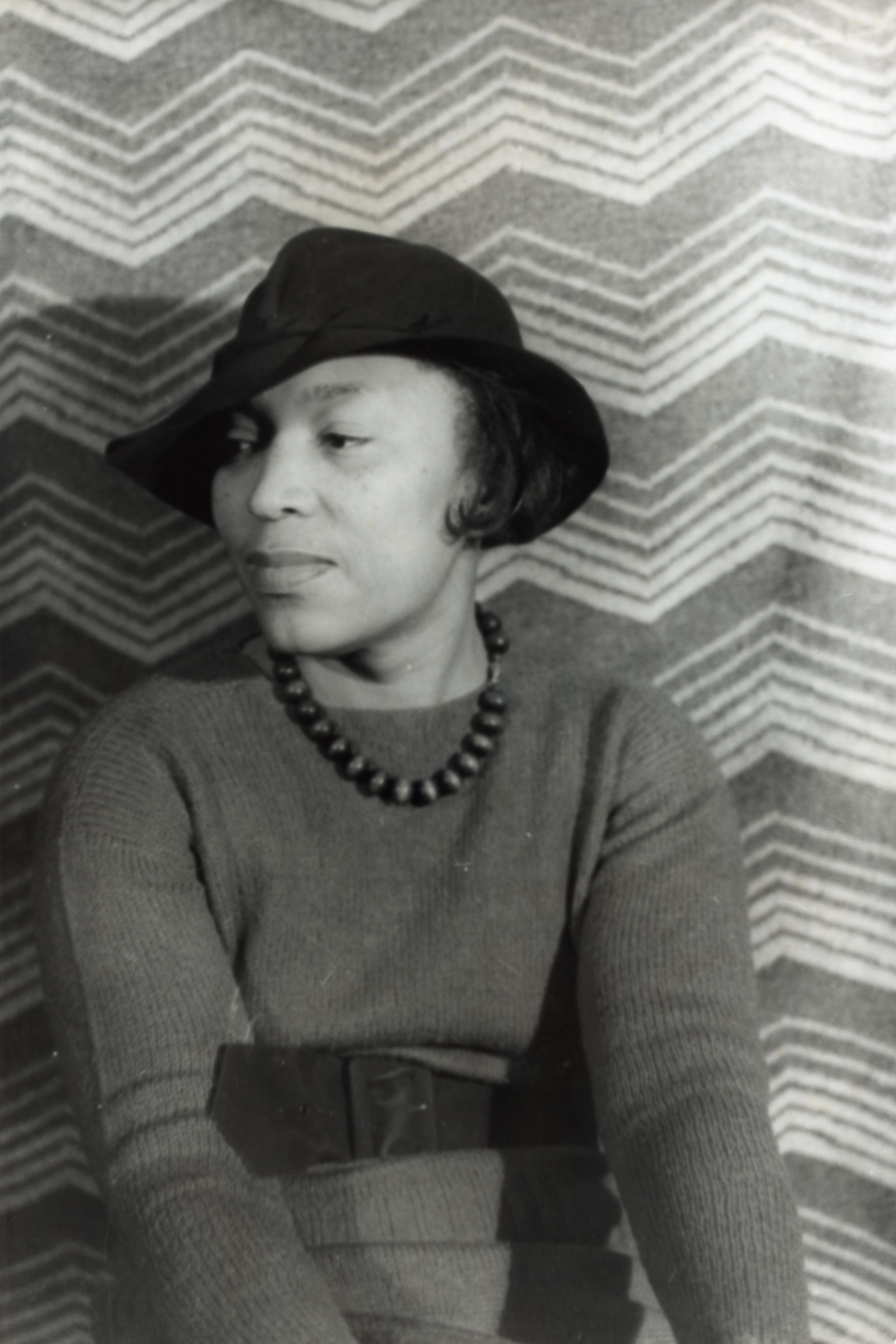
Zora Neale Hurston, 1938

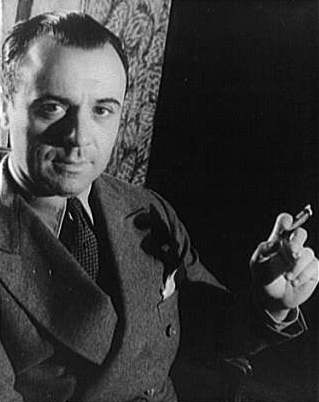
José Iturbi, 1933

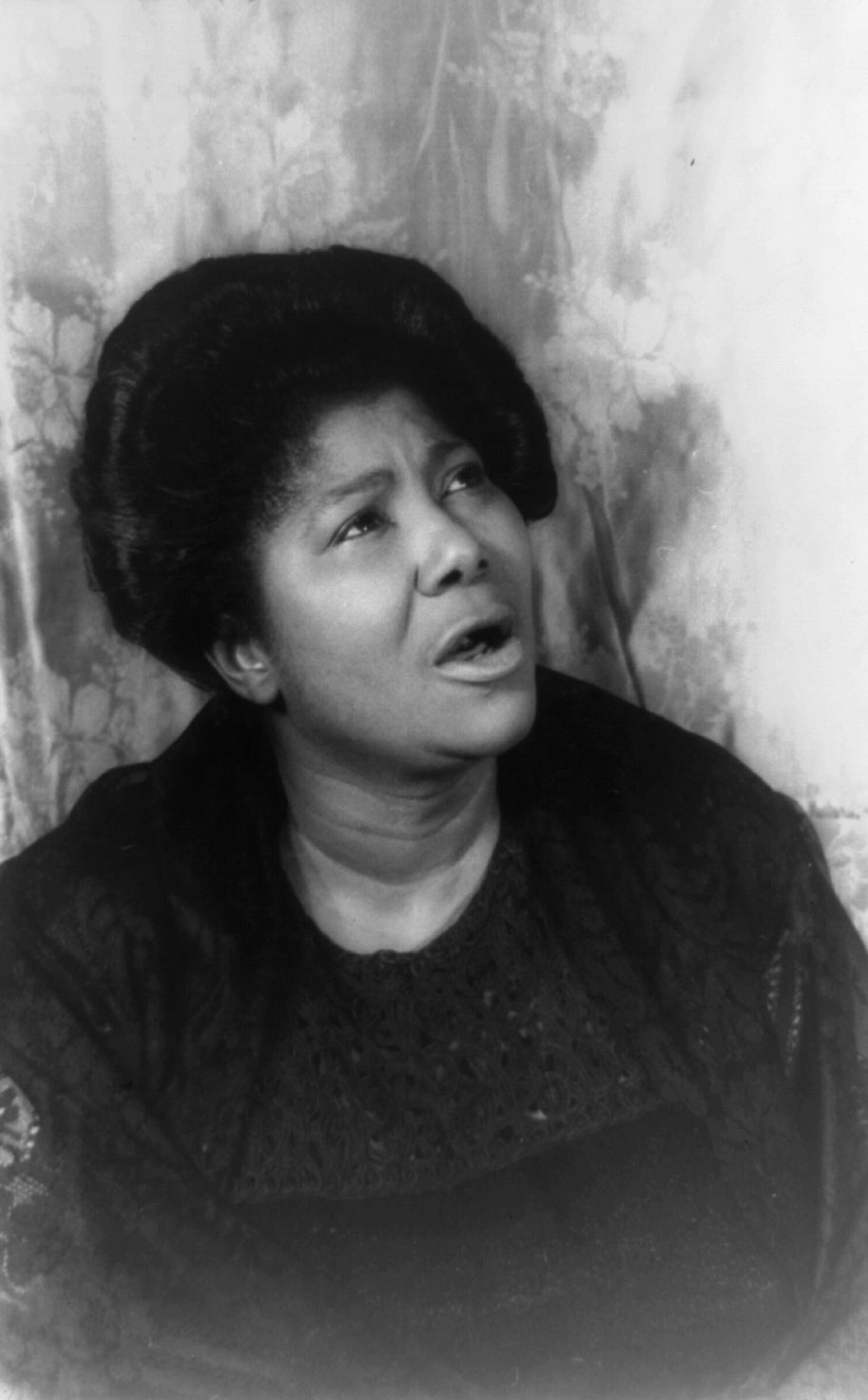
Mahalia Jackson, 1962

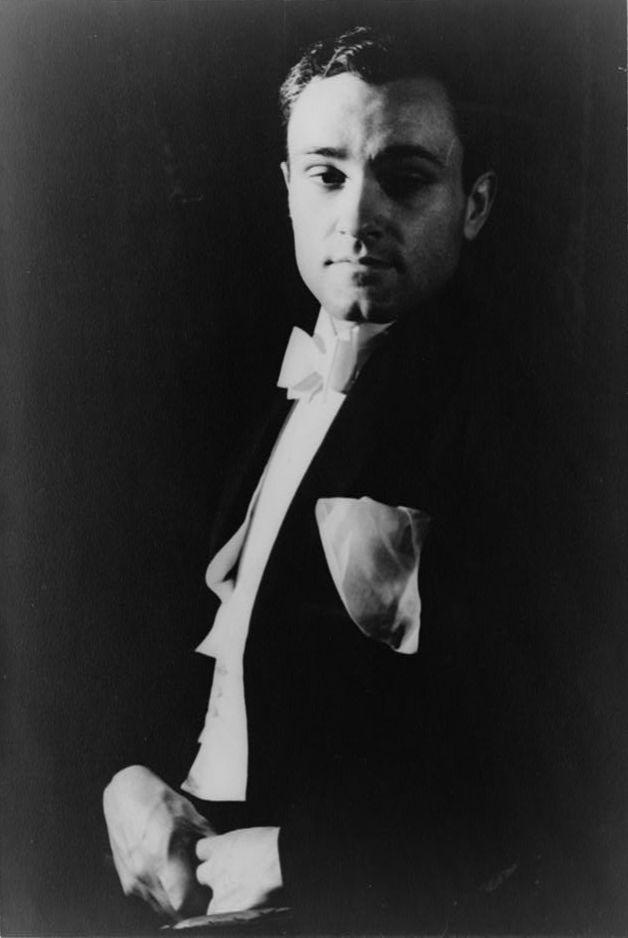
Philip Johnson, 1933

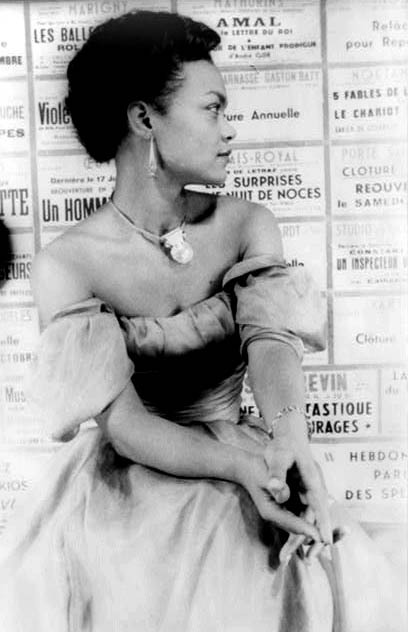
Eartha Kitt, 1952

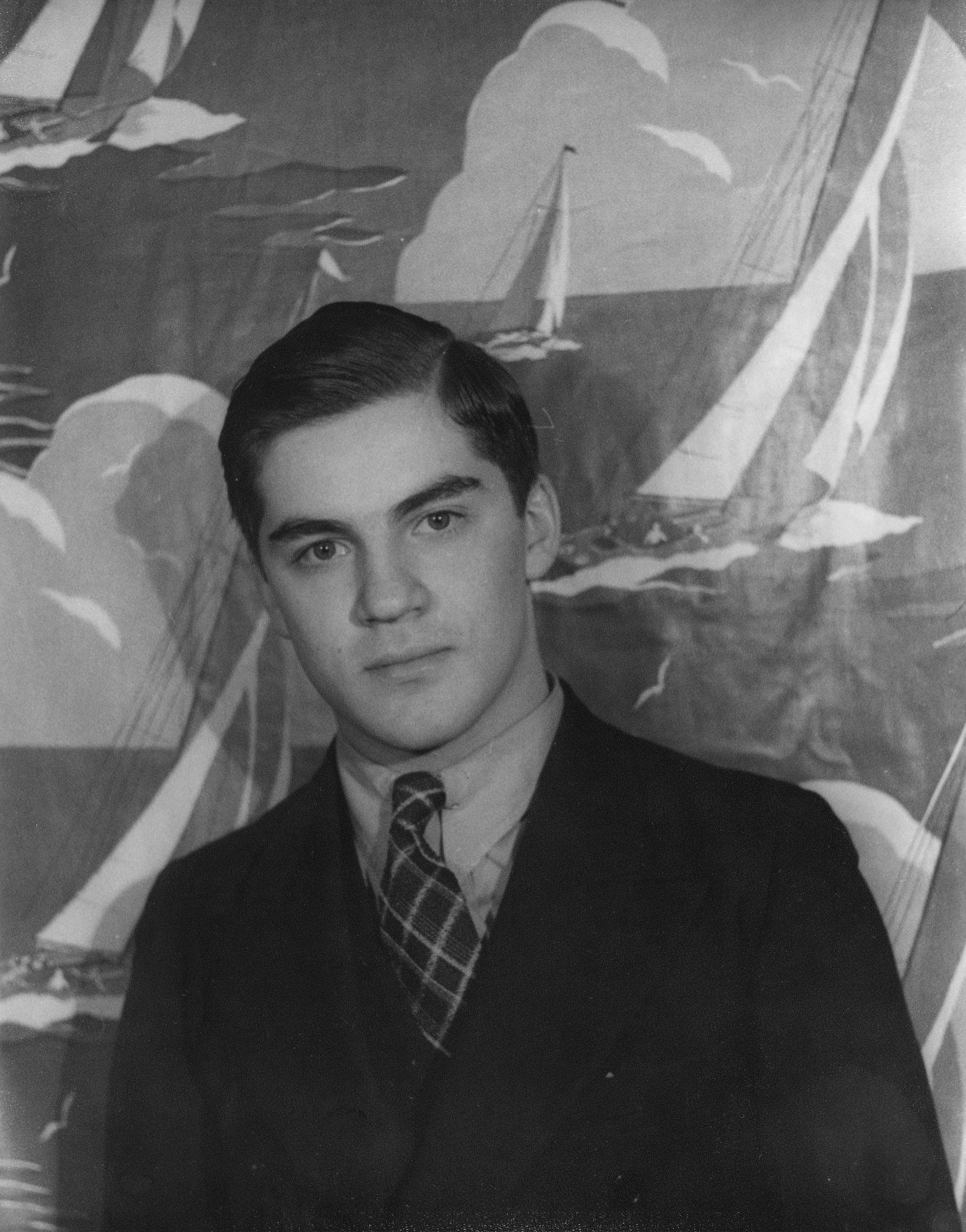
Victor Kraft, 1935

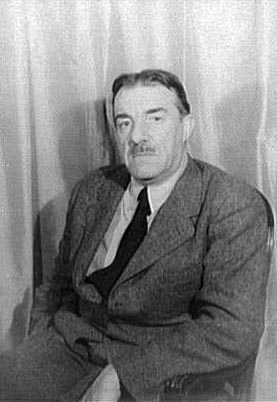
Fernand Léger, 1936

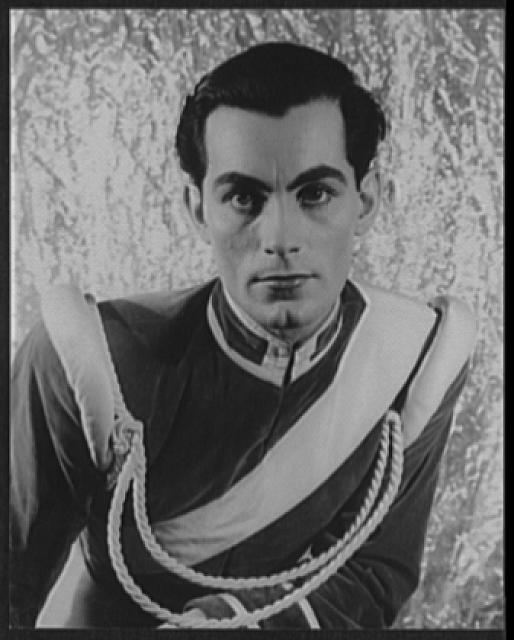
Hugh Laing, 1940

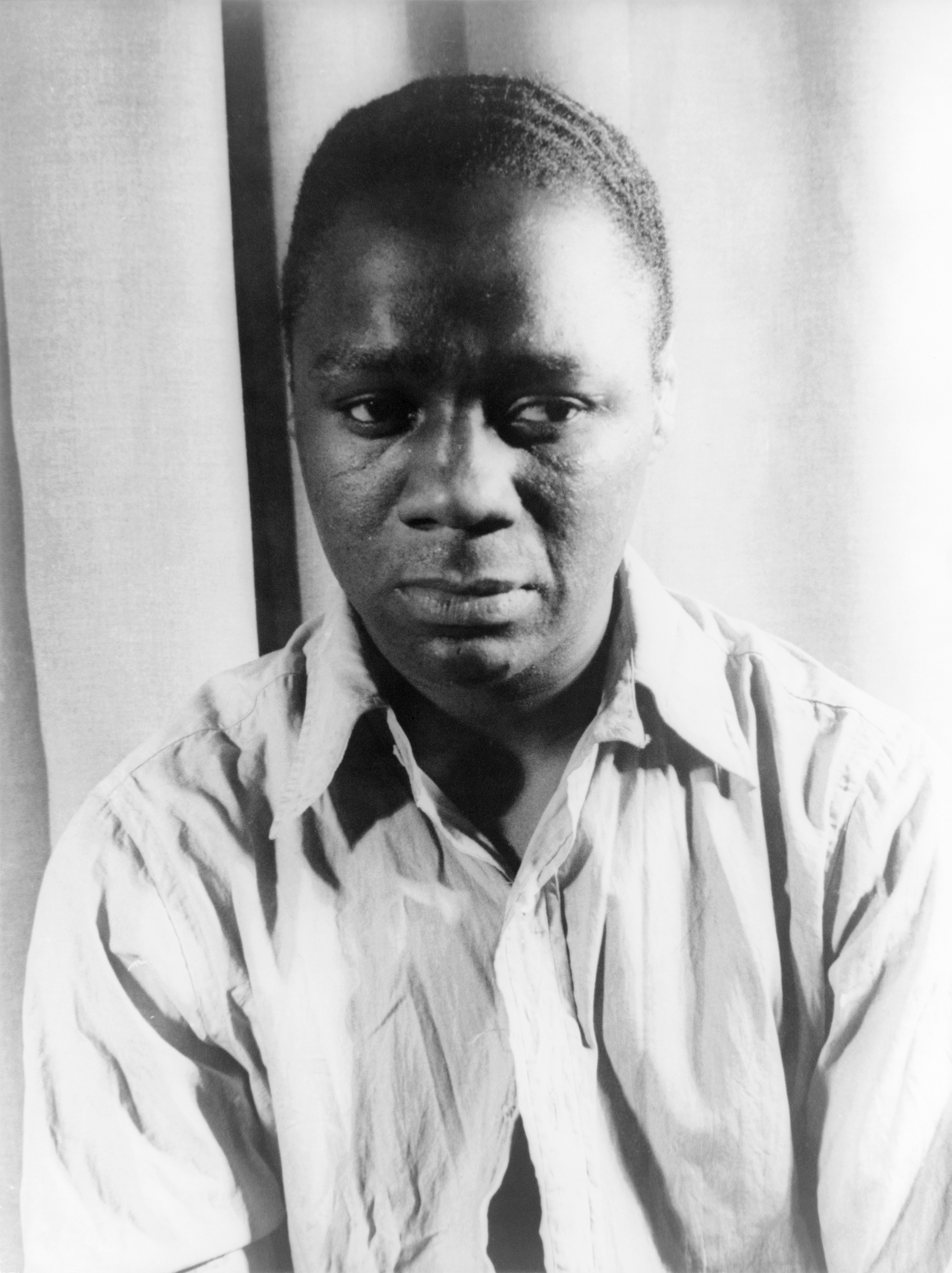
Canada Lee, 1941

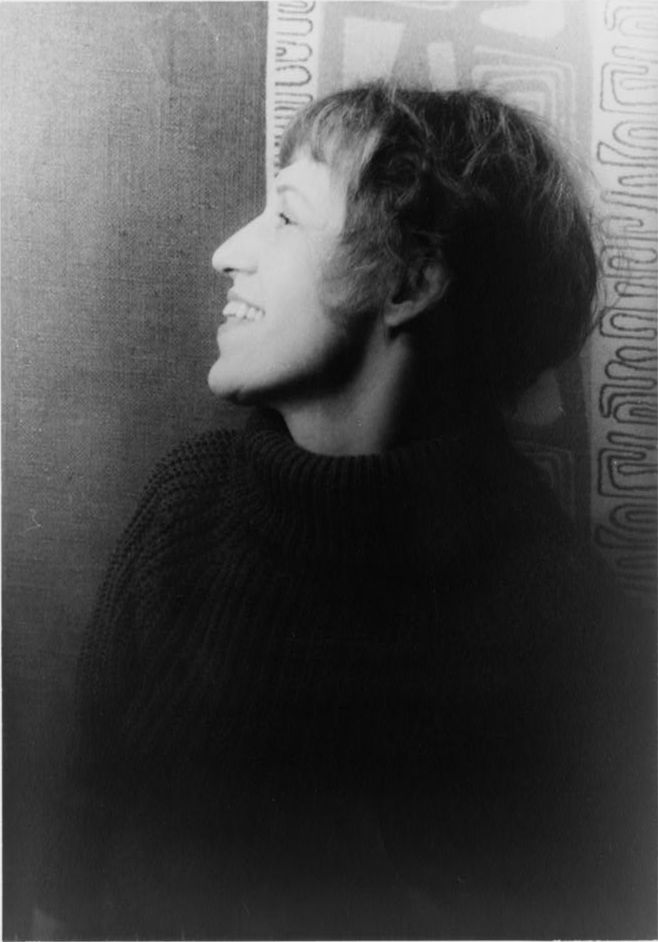
Lotte Lenya, 1962

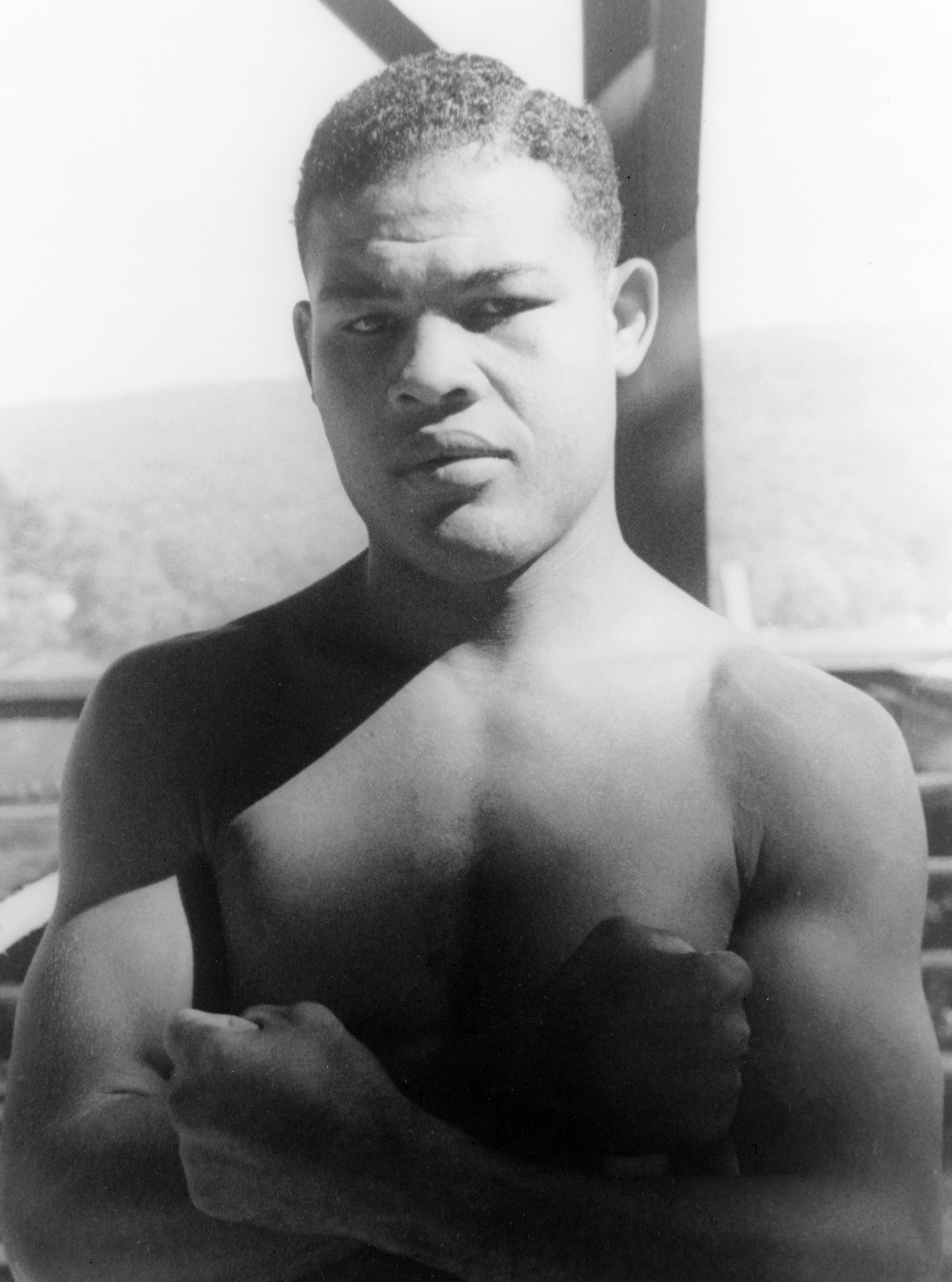
Joe Louis, 1941

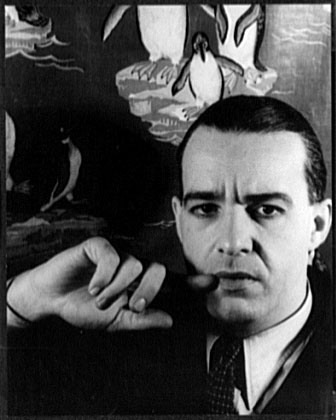
Alfred Lunt, 1932

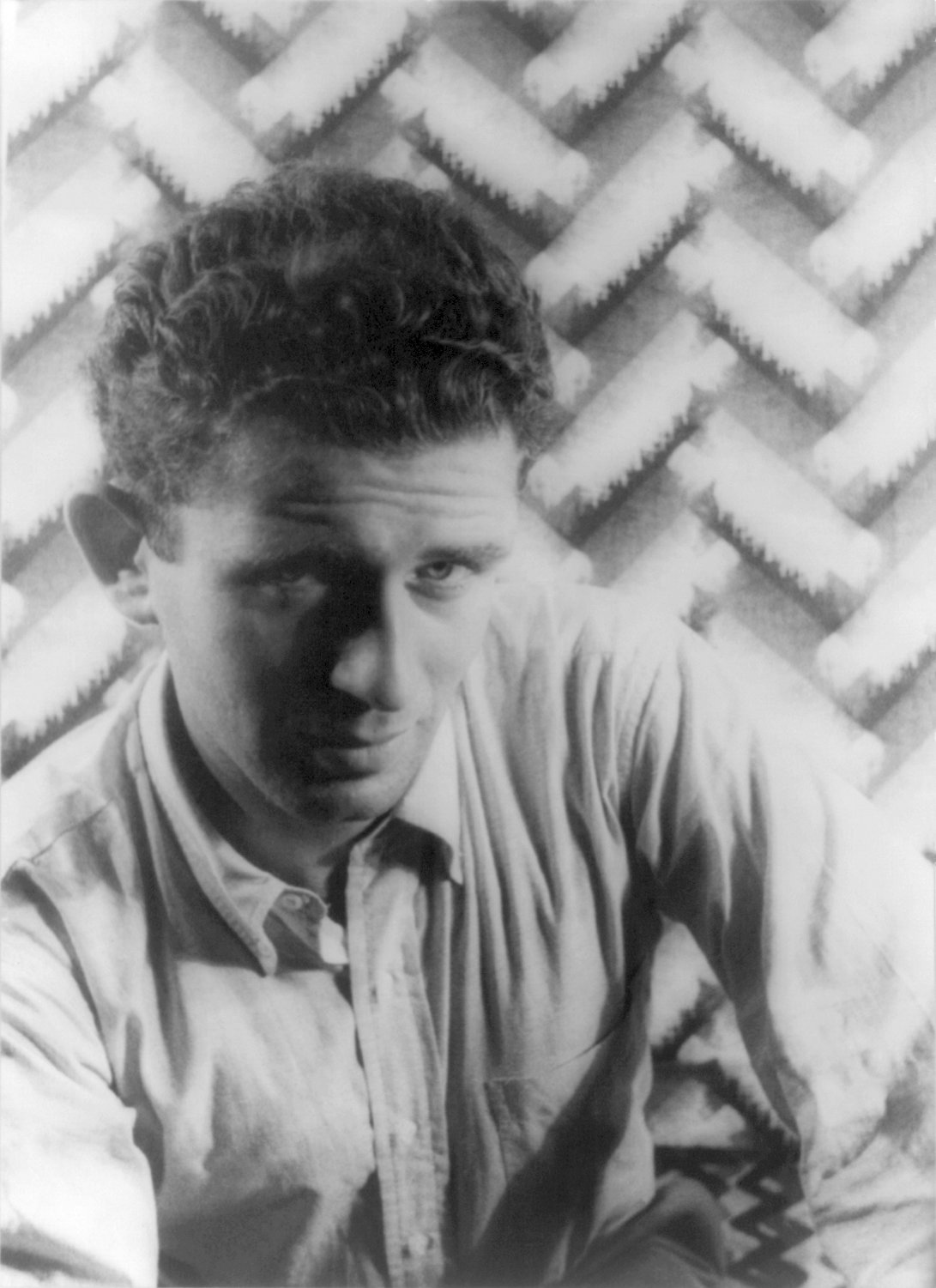
Norman Mailer, 1948

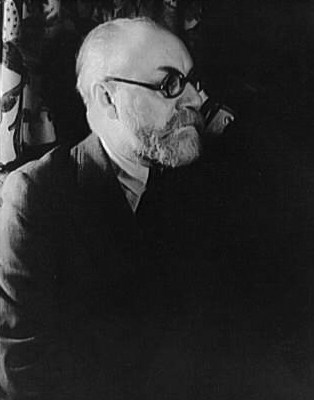
Henri Matisse, 1933

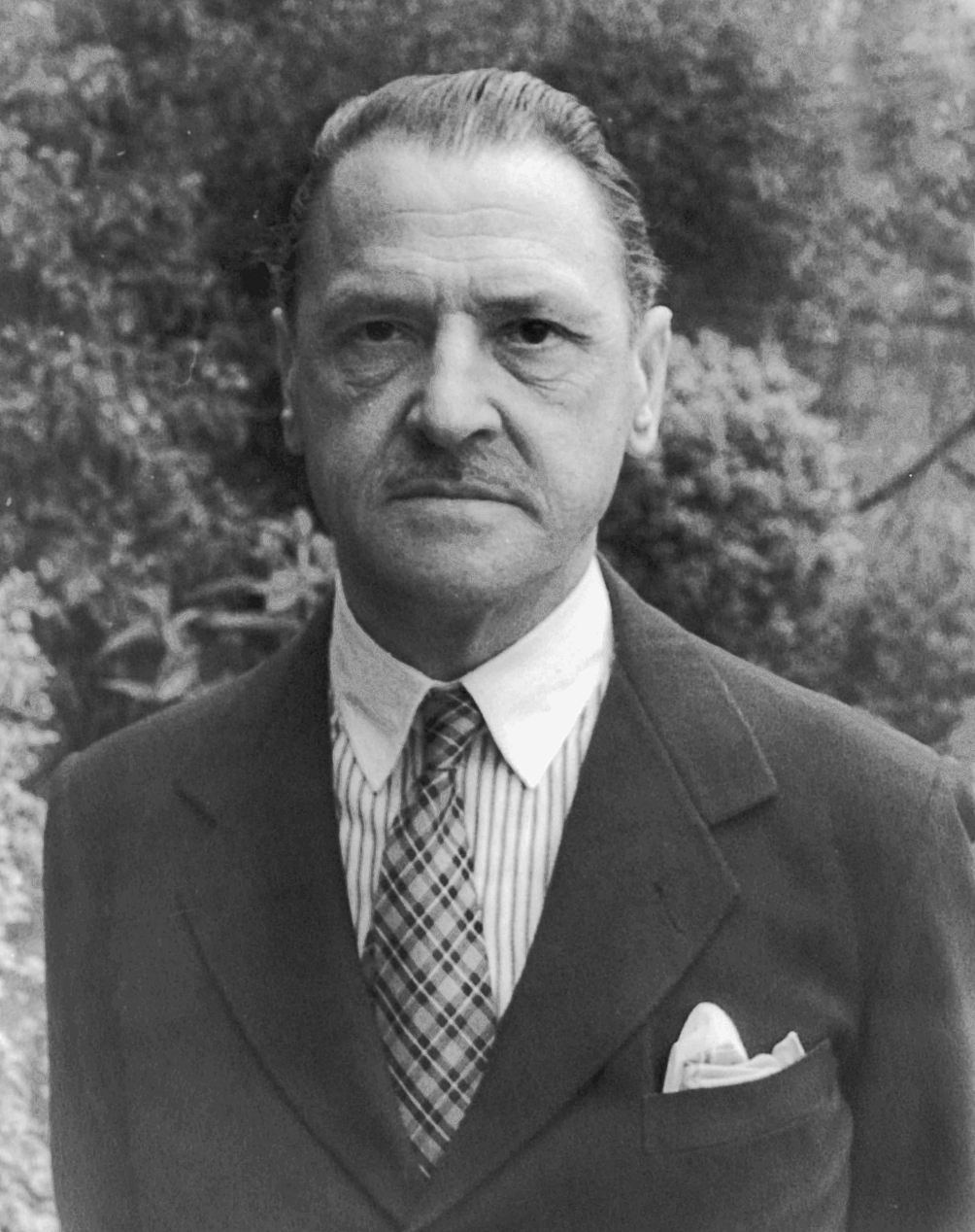
Somerset Maugham, 1934

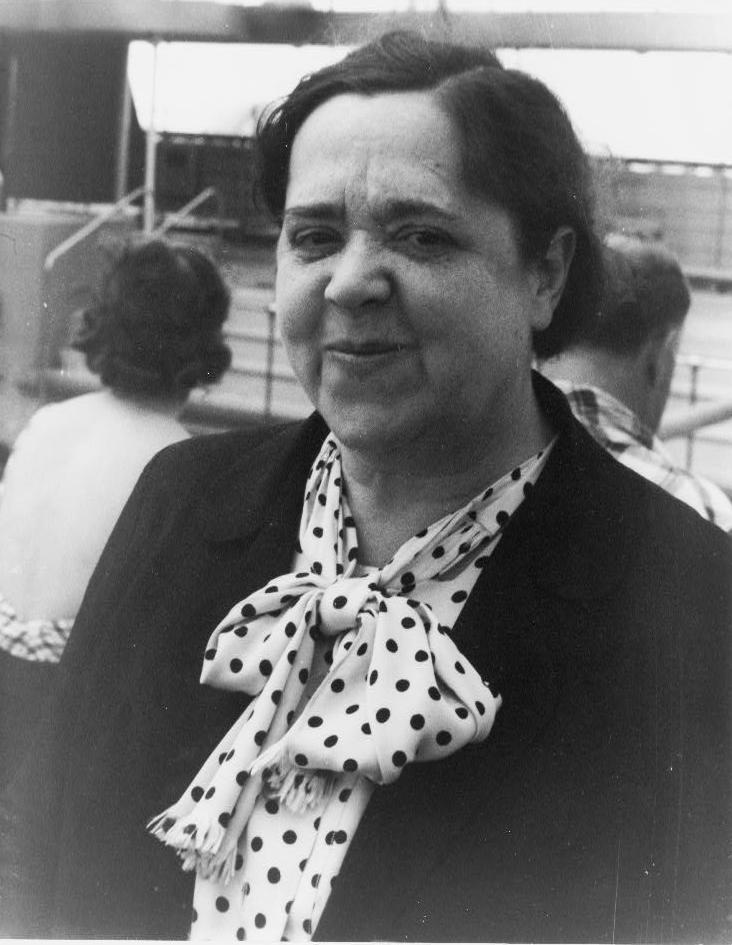
Elsa Maxwell, 1935

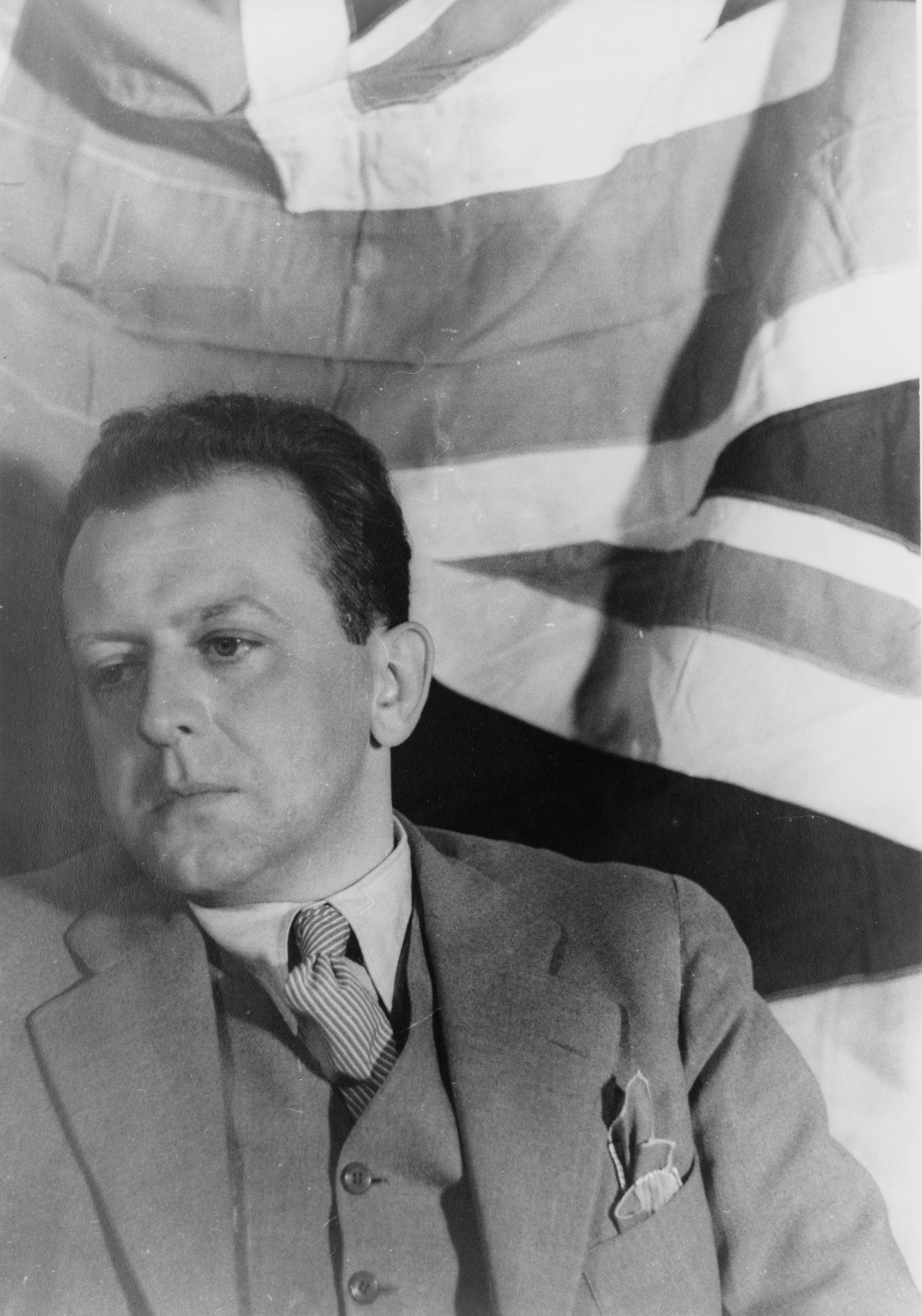
Colin McPhee, 1935

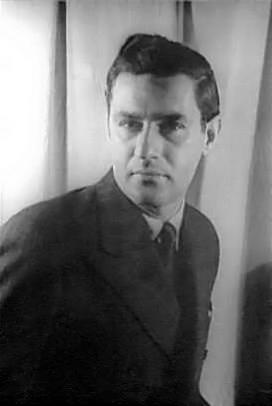
Gian Carlo Menotti, 1944

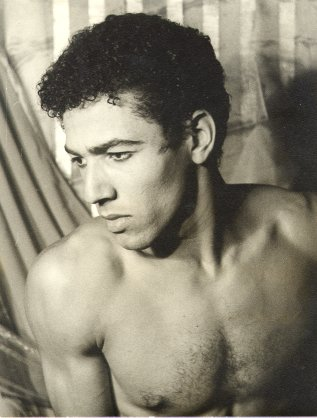
Francisco Moncion, 1947

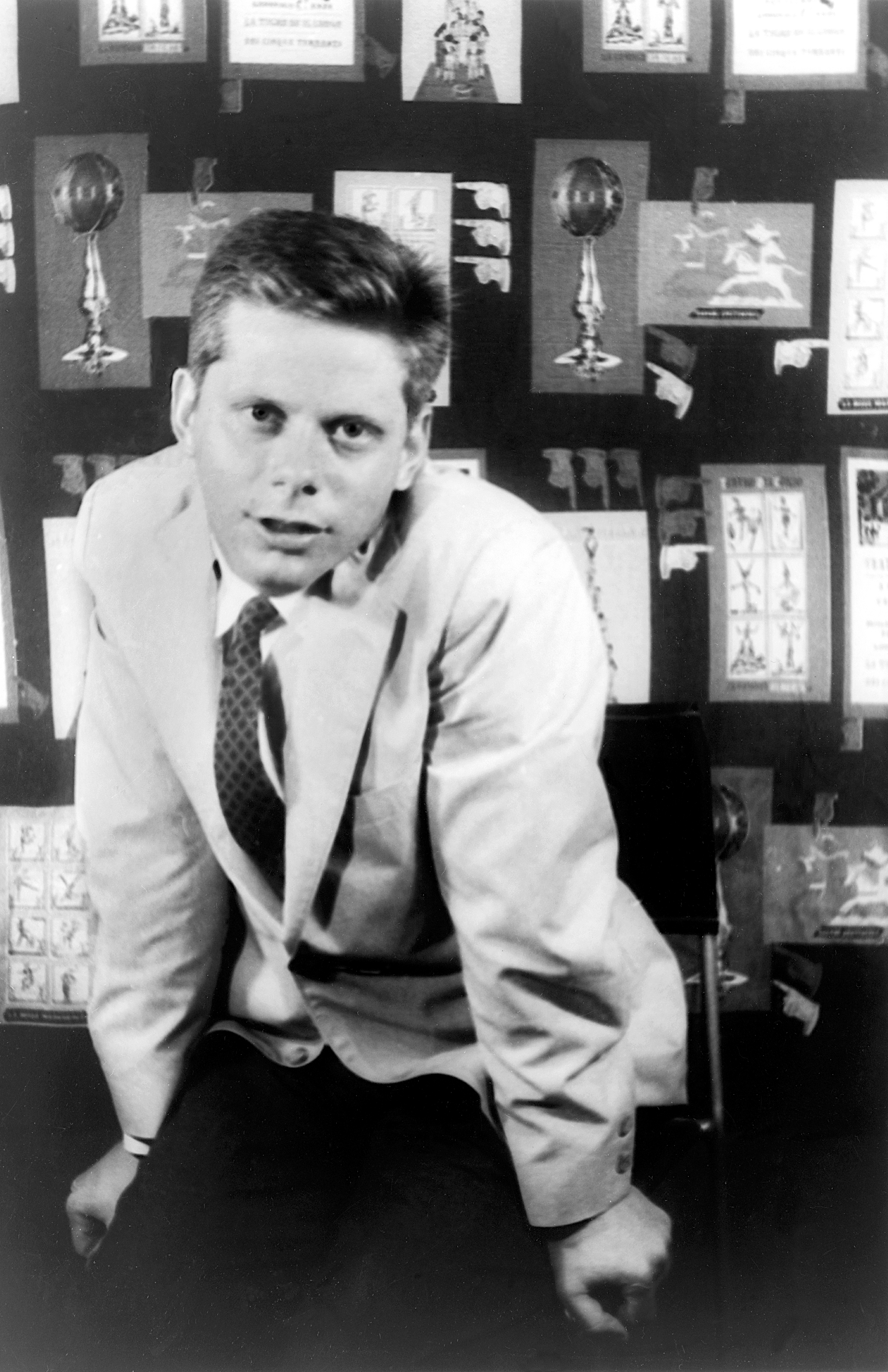
Robert Morse, 1958

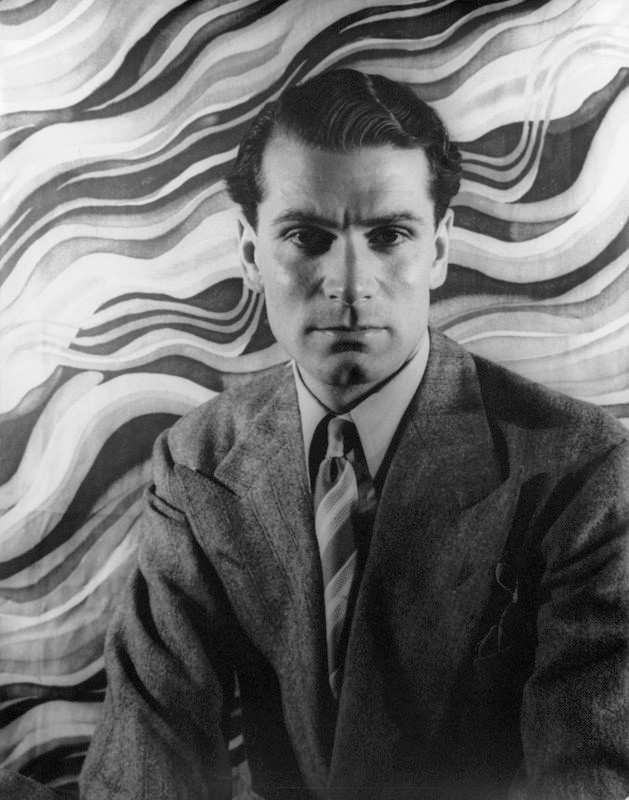
Laurence Olivier, 1939

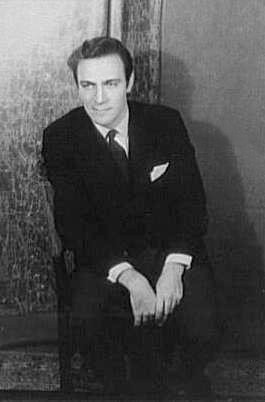
Christopher Plummer, 1959

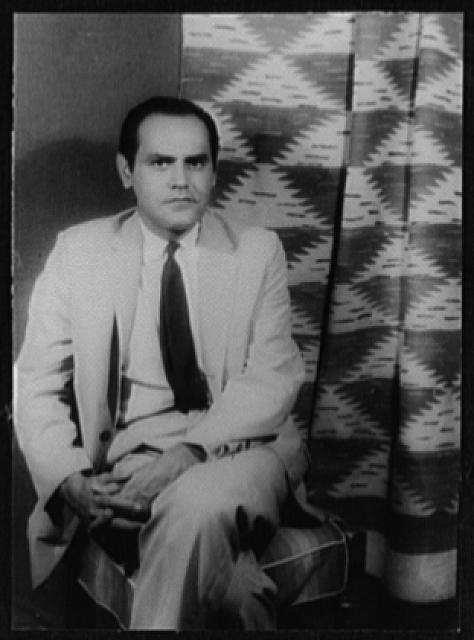
José Quintero, 1958

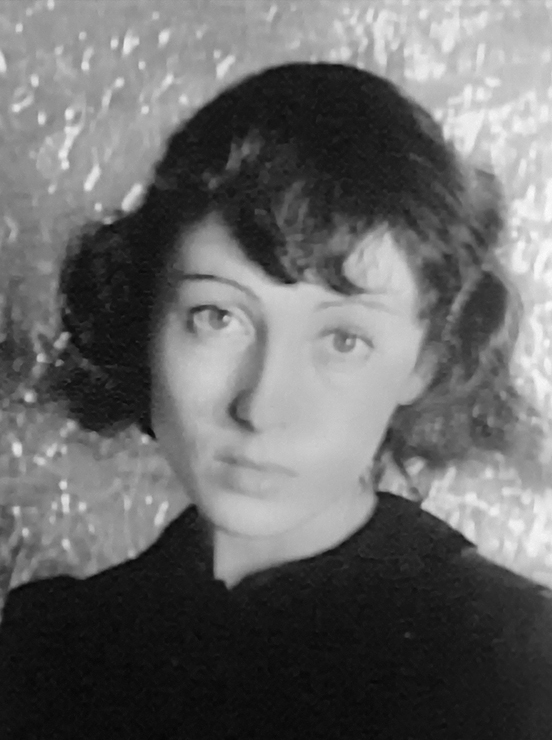
Luise Rainer, 1937

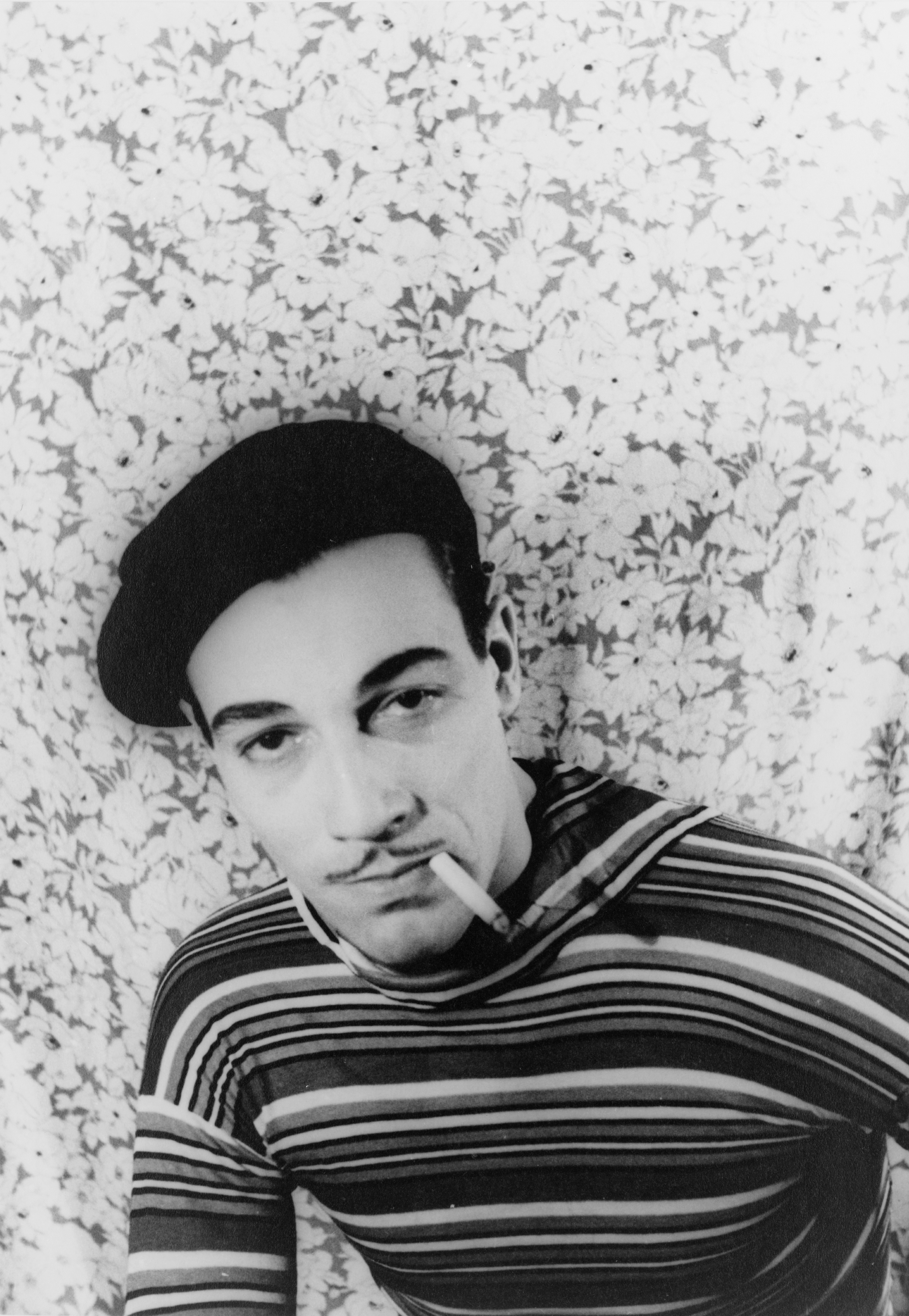
Cesar Romero, 1934

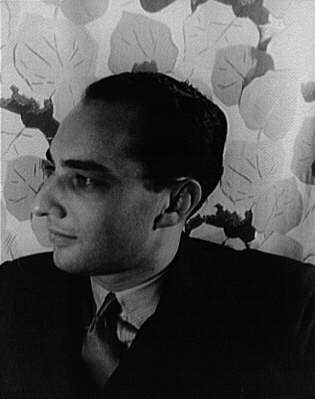
Arthur Schwartz, 1933

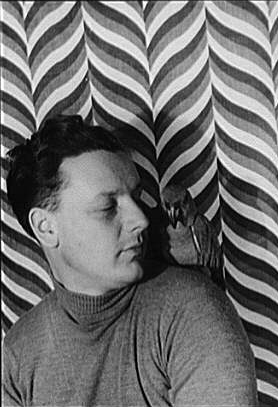
Walter Slezak, 1934

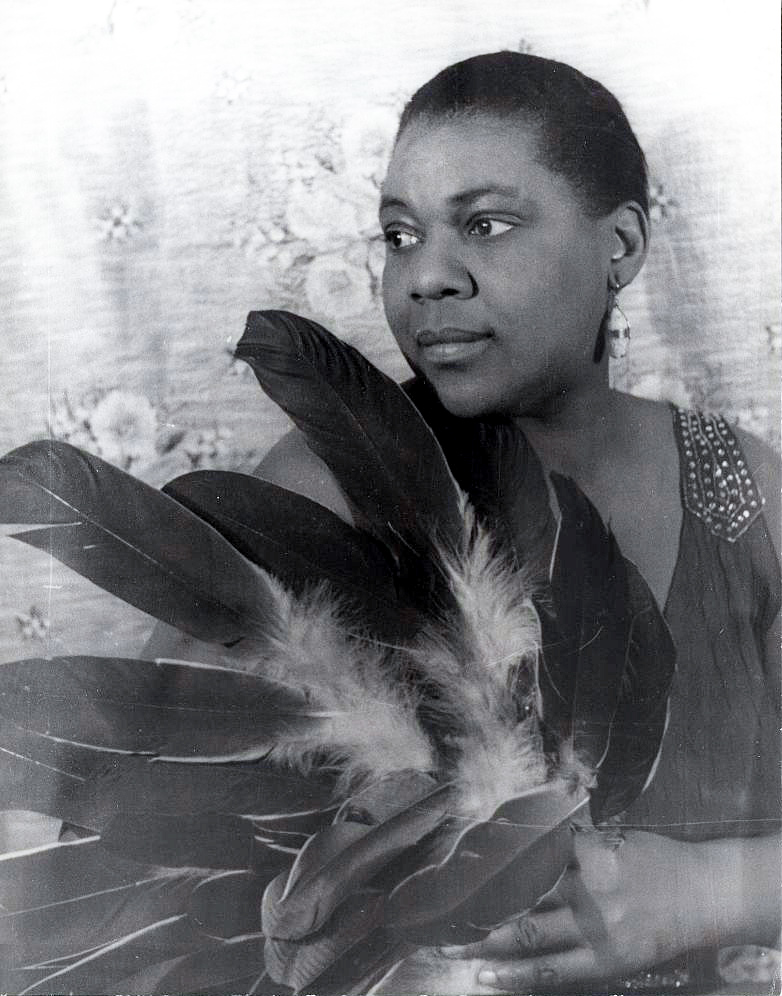
Bessie Smith, 1936

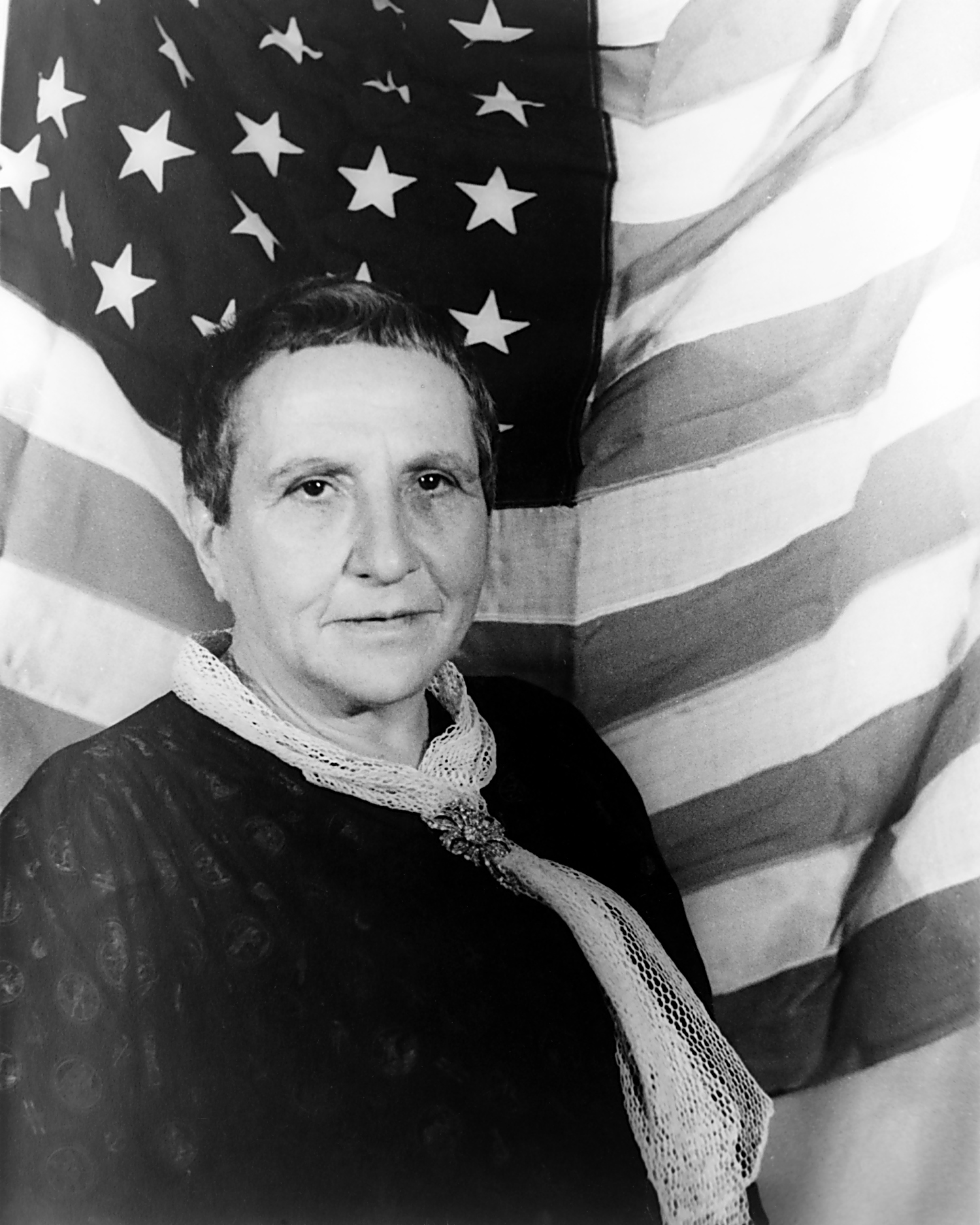
Gertrude Stein, 1935

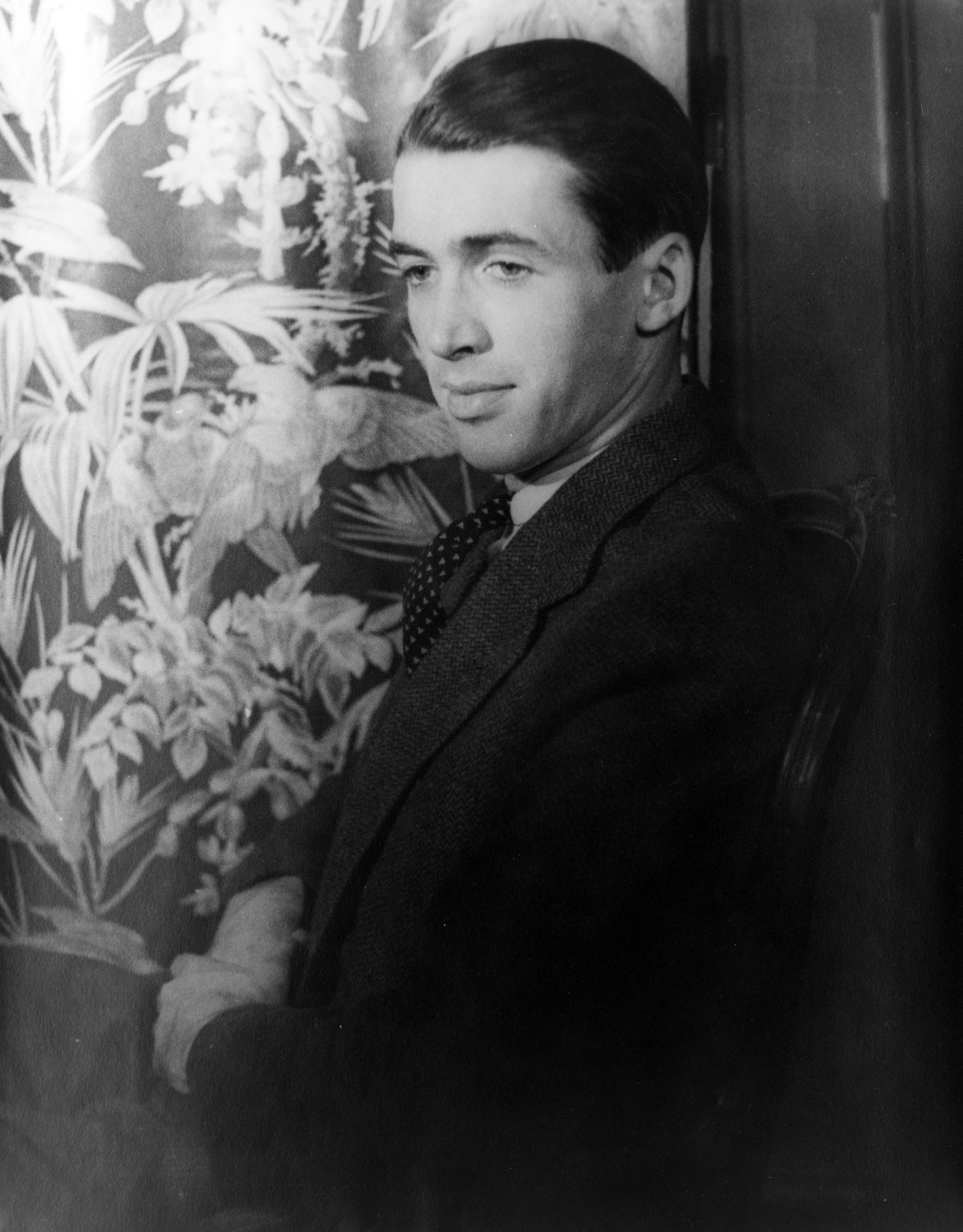
James Stewart, 1934

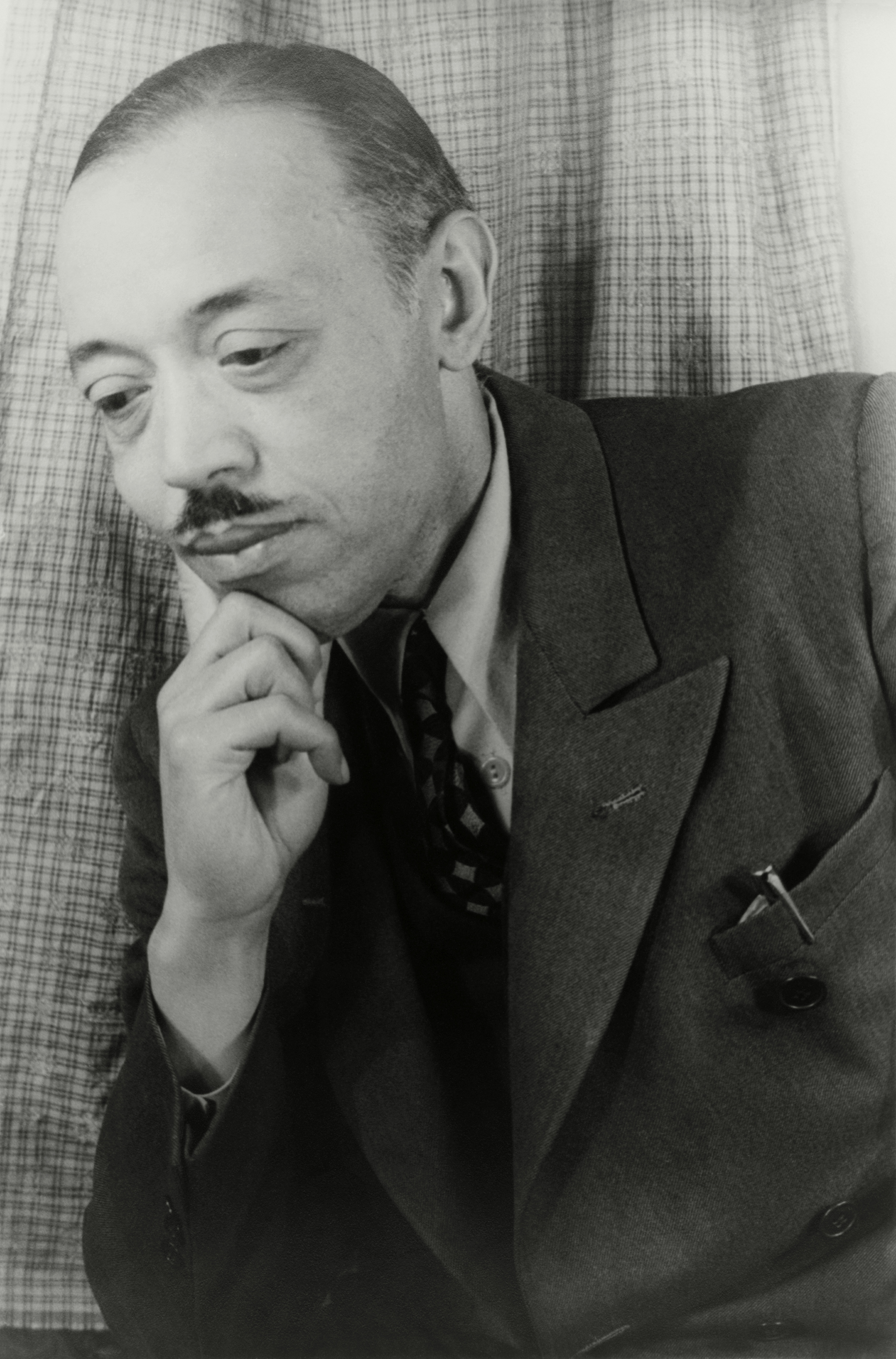
William Grant Still, 1949

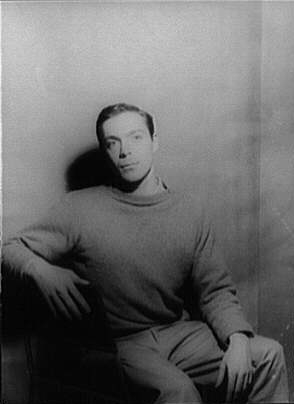
Paul Taylor, 1960

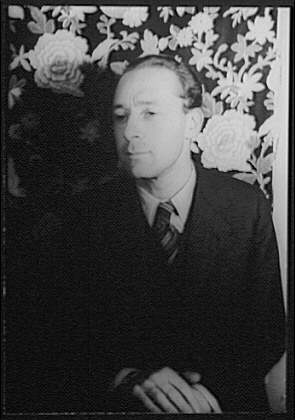
Pavel Tchelitchew, 1934

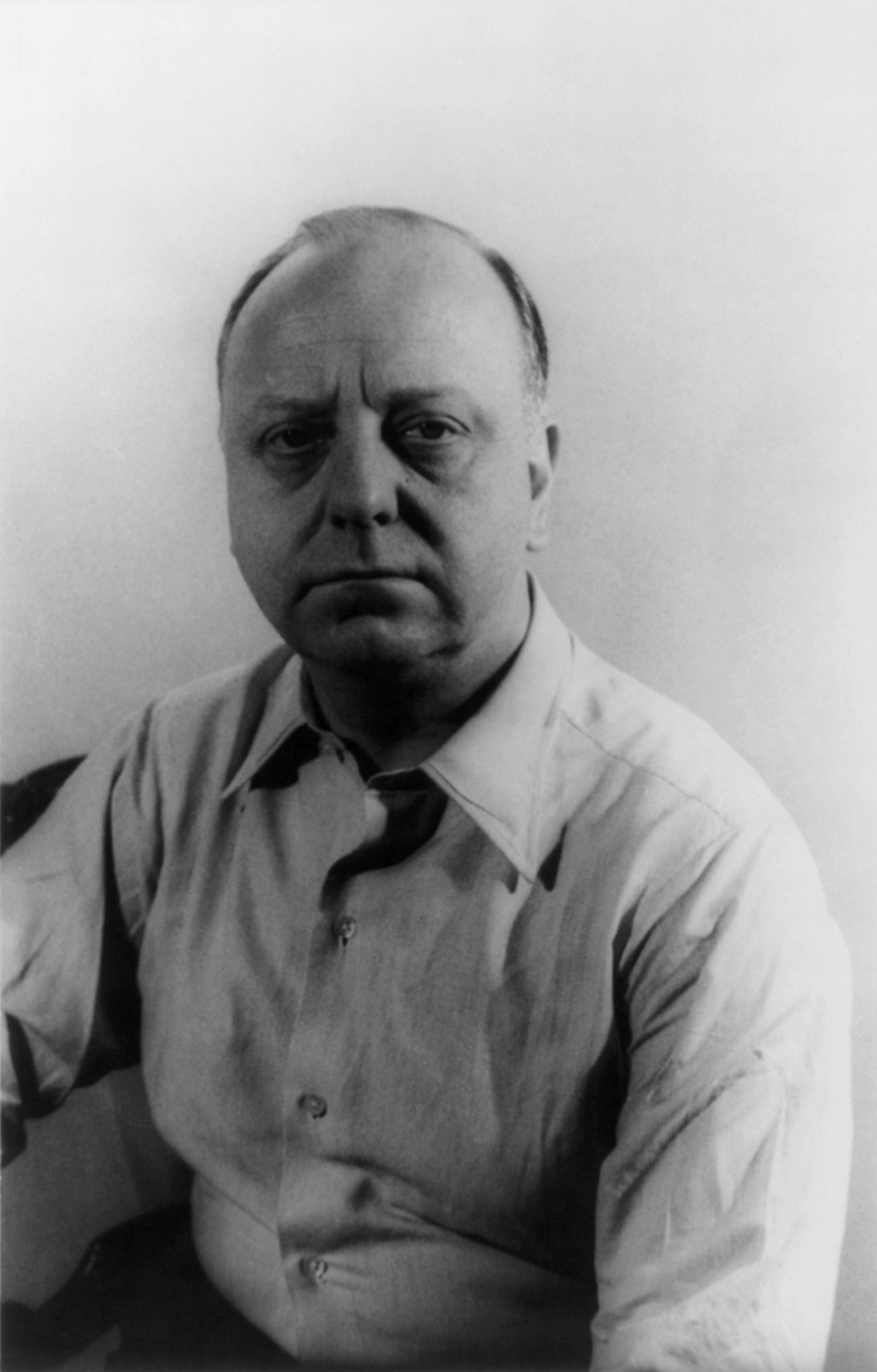
Virgil Thomson, 1947

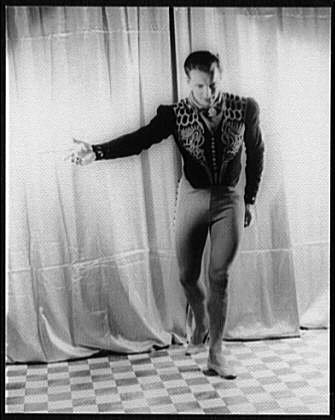
Antony Tudor, 1941

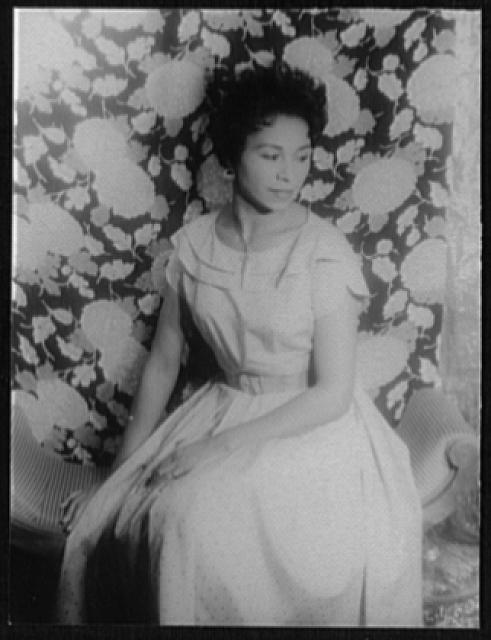
Margaret Tynes, 1959

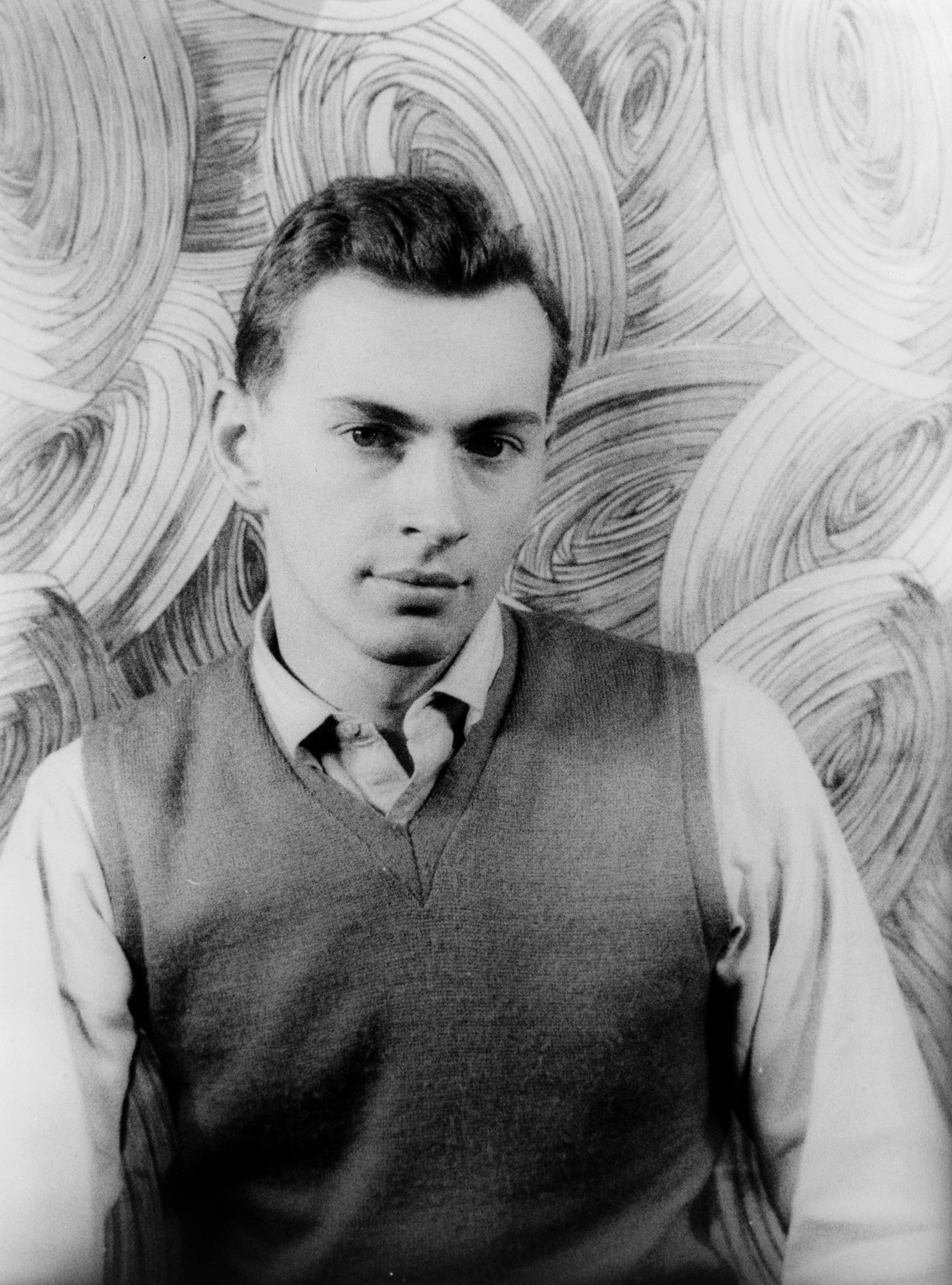
Gore Vidal, 1948

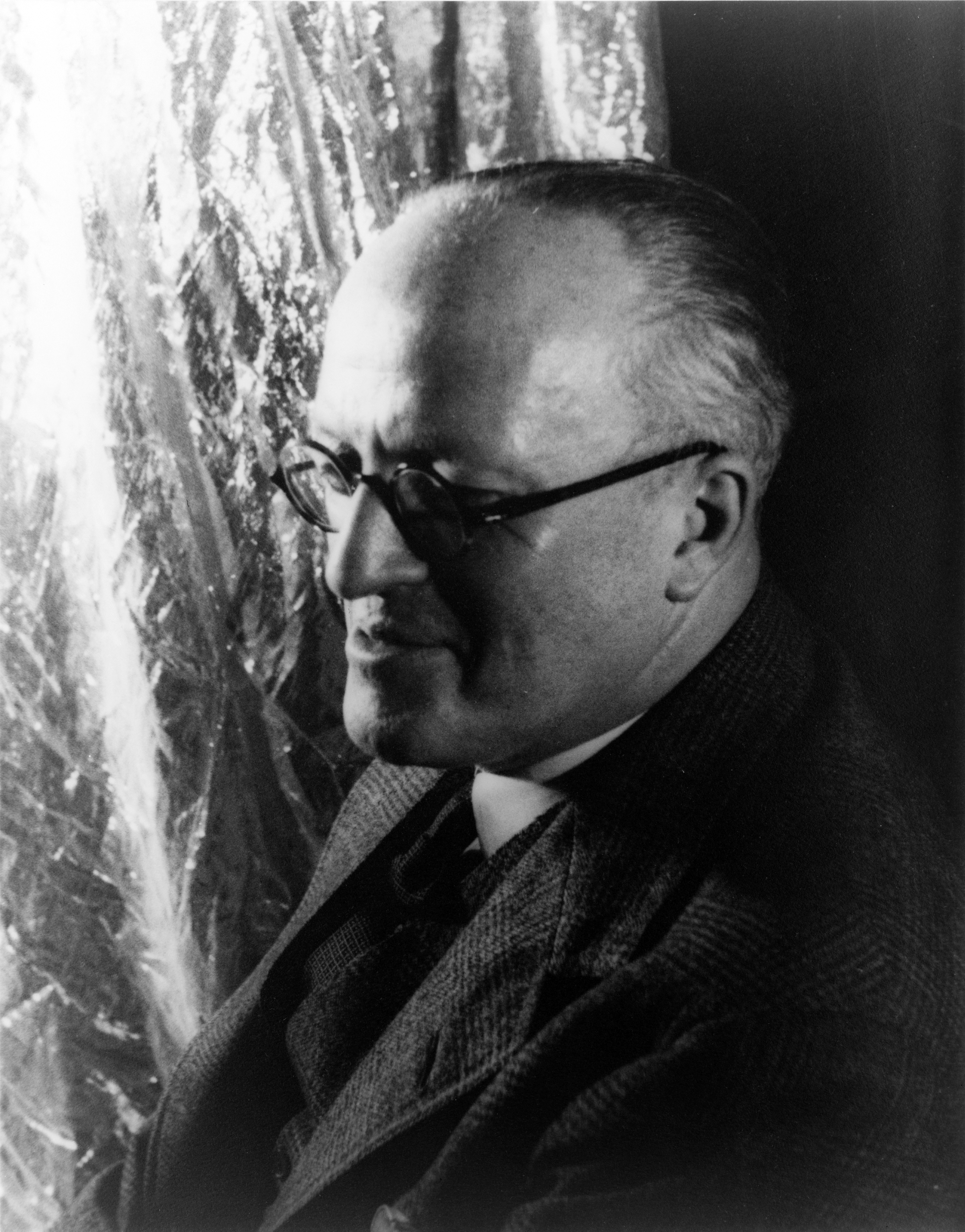
Hugh Walpole, 1934

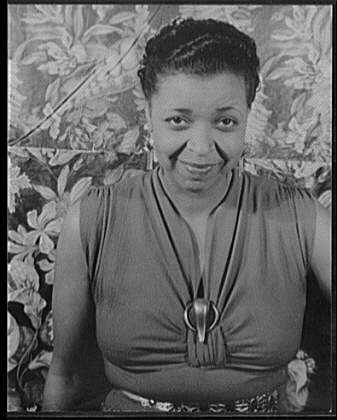
Ethel Waters, 1938

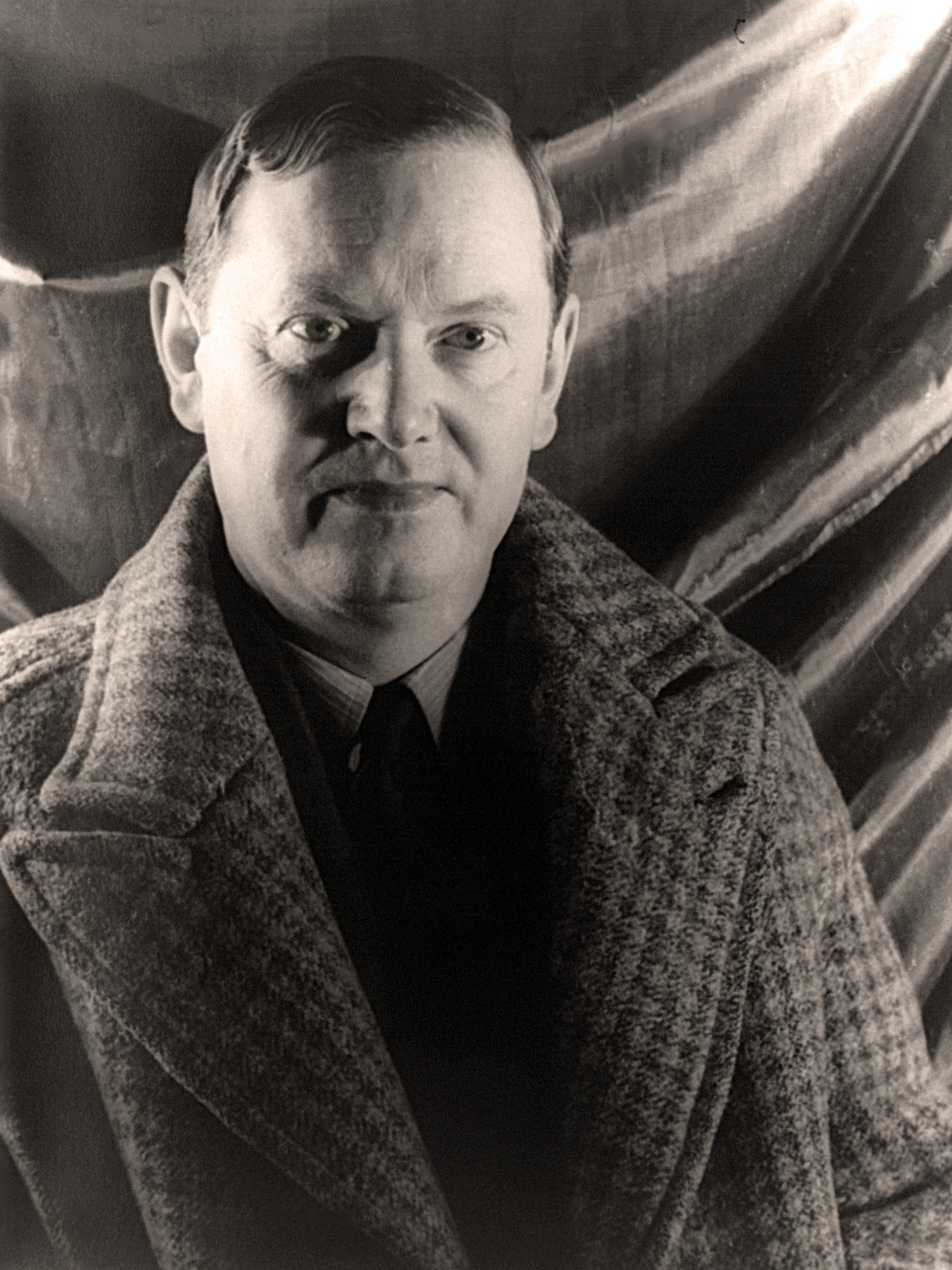
Evelyn Waugh, 1940

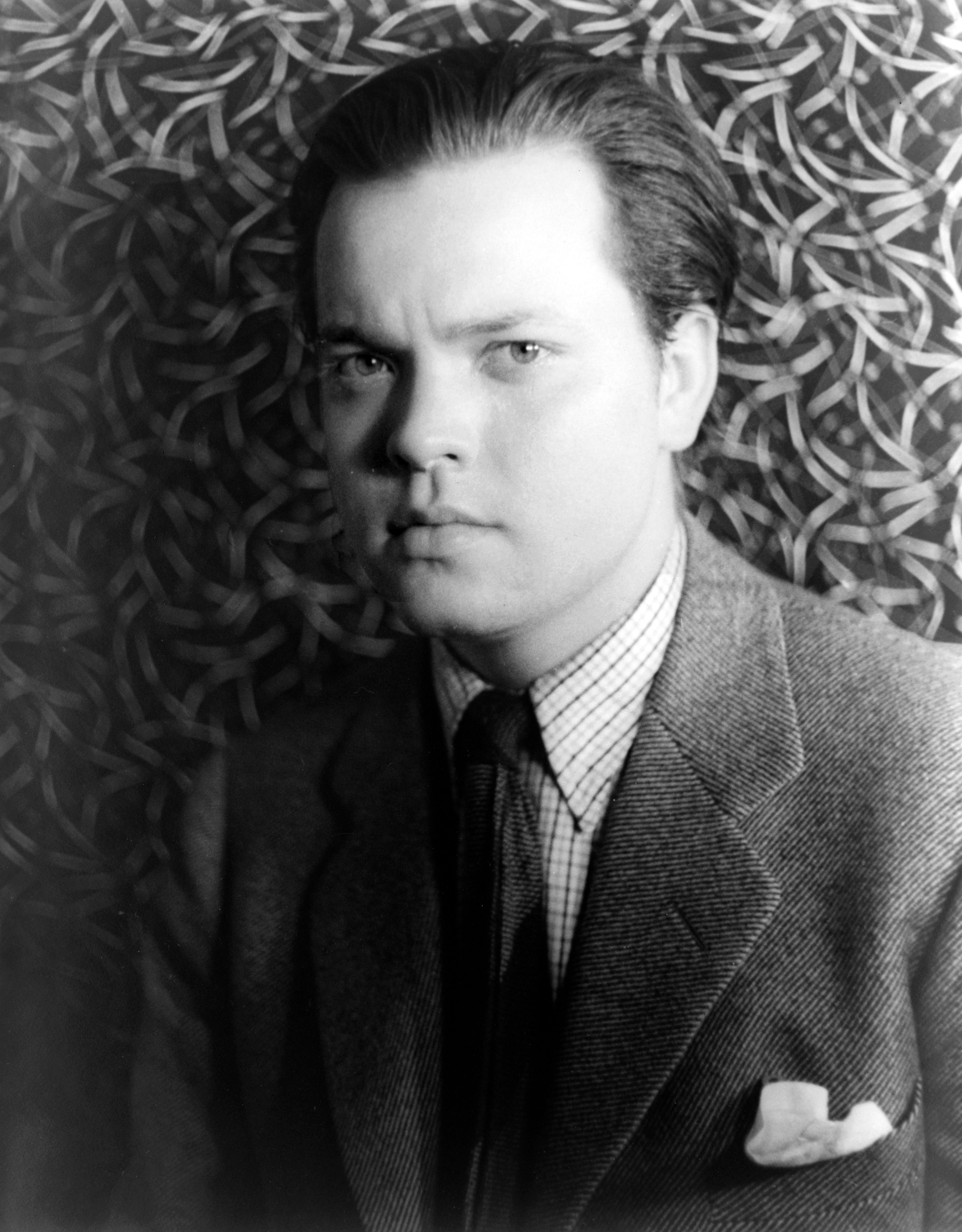
Orson Welles, 1937

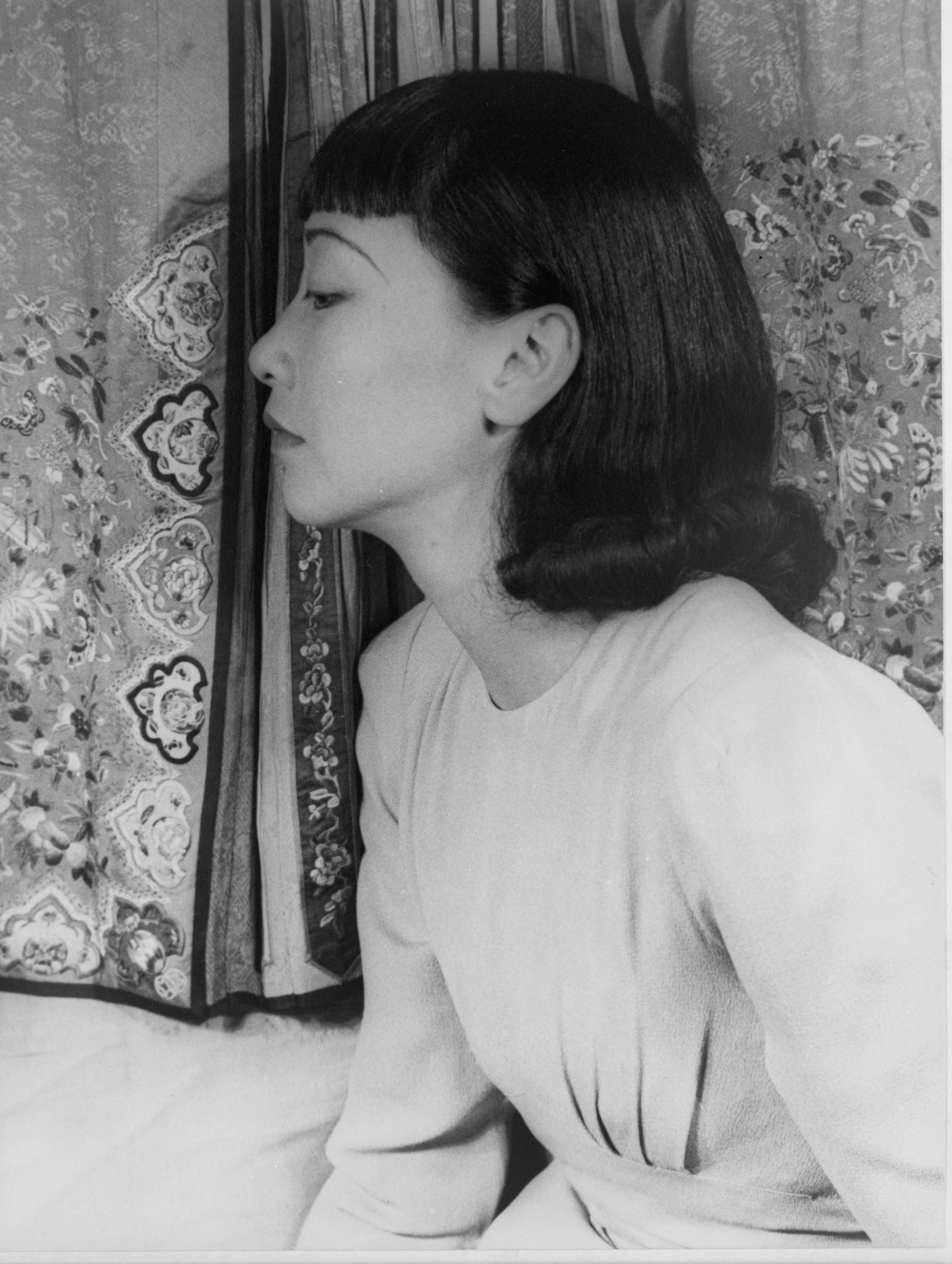
Anna May Wong, 1939

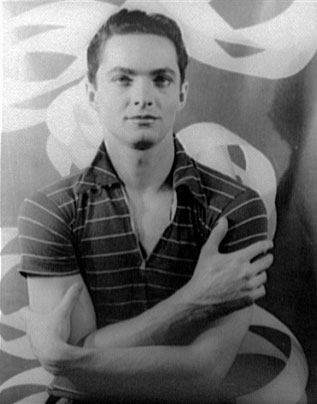
George Zoritch, 1942
