= Deaths in January 1987 =

The following is a list of notable deaths in January 1987.

Entries for each day are listed alphabetically by surname. A typical entry lists information in the following sequence:

- Name, age, country of citizenship at birth, subsequent country of citizenship (if applicable), reason for notability, cause of death (if known), and reference.

== January 1987 ==
=== 1 ===
- Velma Abbott, 62, American baseball player in the All-American Girls Professional Baseball League.
- Avard Fairbanks, 89, American sculptor, heart attack.
- Joseph Hirkala, 63, American politician, member of the New Jersey General Assembly and Senate.
- Maurice Mandelbaum, 78, American philosopher and phenomenologist.
- Ernie Maun, 85, American MLB player.
- Roger McHugh, 78, Irish politician, member of the Seanad Éireann (1954-1957).
- Gustavo Teixeira, 78, Portuguese footballer.

=== 2 ===
- Des Barchard, 64, New Zealand rugby league footballer.
- Ramón Castroviejo, 82, Spanish and American eye surgeon and corneal transplantation pioneer.
- Hazel Daly, 91, American film actress.
- Lovat Dickson, 84, Canadian publisher and writer.
- Arthur Gould-Porter, 81, English film, television and stage actor.
- Jean de Gribaldy, 64, French road cyclist and directeur sportif.
- Harekrushna Mahatab, 87, Indian politician, leader of the Indian National Congress, Chief Minister of Odisha.
- Julio Moreno, 65, Cuban-born American MLB player (Washington Senators).
- Paul Parisel, 82, French Olympic wrestler (1924, 1928).
- Leo Sack, 72, American basketball player.
- Alfred Schindler, 92, American industrialist, acting U.S. Secretary of Commerce.
- Ted Thorndike, 34, American Olympic ice hockey player (1976).
- Bill Upton, 57, American MLB player (Philadelphia Athletics).

=== 3 ===
- Alex "Big Daddy" Campbell, 55, Scottish folk singer, tuberculosis.
- Andrew Collier, 62, Canadian forces officer.
- Arvind Deshpande, 54, Indian film, theatre and television actor and theatre director.
- Sunder Lal, appr. 64, Indian independence activist and politician, Member of Parliament.
- John Bartlow Martin, 71, American diplomat and author, U.S. Ambassador to the Dominican Republic, throat cancer.
- William R. Poage, 87, American politician, member of the U.S. House of Representatives (1937-1978), heart failure.
- Franck Sylvain, 77, Haitian politician, acting President of Haiti.

=== 4 ===
- Paul Francis Anderson, 69, American prelate.
- Peggy Bacon, 91, American artist, known for satirical caricatures.
- Lauretta Bender, 89, American child neuropsychiatrist, developed the Bender-Gestalt Test.
- Dave Burke, 70, Australian rules footballer.
- Aubert C. Dunn, 90, American attorney and politician, member of the U.S. House of Representatives (1935-1937).
- Jack Martin, 69, English cricketer.
- Tony Rensa, 85, American MLB player.
- John A. Seitz, 78, American general of the U.S. Army.
- Tom Verdell, 81, American college football player and coach.

=== 5 ===
- Arthur Collinson, 57, Australian rugby league player.
- Salter Hayden, 90, Canadian politician, member of the Senate of Canada (1940-1983).
- Elie Hervier, 90, French sculptor.
- Margaret Laurence, 60, Canadian novelist and short story writer, suicide.
- Dale Mitchell, 65, American Major League baseball player (Cleveland Indians), heart attack.
- Helenka Pantaleoni, 86, American silent-screen actress.
- Ambrogio Portalupi, 43, Italian racing cyclist.
- Herman Smith-Johannsen, 111, Norwegian skier and supercentenarian, pneumonia.

=== 6 ===
- Taddy Aycock, 71, American politician, Lieutenant Governor of Louisiana.
- Daniel Carney, 42, Rhodesian novelist, cancer.
- Sir Robert Cooke, 56, British politician, Member of Parliament, motor neuron disease.
- Anghel Crețeanu, 76, Romanian footballer.
- Margaret Danhauser, 65, American baseball player in the All-American Girls Professional Baseball League.
- Jaidev, 68, Kenyan-born Indian music composer.
- N. N. Kakkad, 59, Indian poet, cancer.
- Ted Scalissi, 65, American football and basketball player.
- Jack Schwarz, 90, American independent producer of low-budget feature films.

=== 7 ===
- Martha George, 94, native American tribal leader, chairperson of the Suquamish tribe.
- Willie Hermiston, 73, Scottish cricketer.
- Lakshmi, 65, Indian writer.
- Avner Less, 71, German-born Israeli police officer, interrogated Adolf Eichmann after he was captured.
- Magnar Lundemo, 48, Norwegian Olympic cross-country skier (1960, 1964).
- Charles Lyon, 71, American Olympic sailor (1932).
- Jackie Mitchell, 73, American female baseball player, struck out Babe Ruth and Lou Gehrig in succession.

=== 8 ===
- Wilfrid Jasper Walter Blunt, 85, English writer and artist, curator of Watts Gallery.
- Leo Callaghan, 62, Welsh football referee in the English Football League.
- Jack Corcoran, 82, American NFL player.
- Gurney Evans, 79, Canadian politician, member of the Legislative Assembly of Manitoba (1953-1969).
- Nana Joshi, 60, Indian Test cricketer, liver cancer.
- Mary Lindell, 91, English woman, front-line nurse in World War I, member of the French Resistance in World War II.
- Walter R. Mansfield, 75, American judge, judge of the U.S. Court of Appeals for the Second Circuit, stroke.
- Elmer Miller, 83, American MLB player (Philadelphia Phillies).
- Myron Prinzmetal, 78, American cardiologist.
- Christian F. Schilt, 91, American general in the U.S. Marine Corps, Medal of Honor recipient.
- Phil Seghi, 77, American front-office executive in Major League Baseball, cancer.

=== 9 ===
- Carl Gunnar Engström, 74, Swedish physician and inventor.
- Frank Koon, 78, American college football and basketball coach.
- Arthur Lake, 81, American actor, heart attack.
- Jack Lathrop, 73, American vocalist and guitarist.
- Blake Miller, 97, American football player and coach.
- Bill Noël, 72, American oilman, banker and civic leader, cancer.
- Alex B. Novikoff, 73, Russian Empire–born American biologist.
- Shabtai Shikhman, 71, Polish-born Israeli politician, member of the Knesset (1959-1965).

=== 10 ===
- Thomas Offenberg Backer, 94, Norwegian engineer.
- Steve Casey, 78, Irish rower and world champion wrestler.
- Ian Harvey, 72, British businessman and politician, Member of Parliament.
- Frank Hiller, 66, American MLB player.
- Marion Hutton, 67, American singer and actress, cancer.
- Dominick Labino, 76, American engineer and master craftsman in glass.
- Frank Makosky, 76, American MLB player (New York Yankees).
- Håkan Malmrot, 87, Swedish swimmer, Olympic champion (1920).
- Handsome Ned, 29, Canadian country singer and songwriter, overdose.
- Sir David Robinson, 82, British entrepreneur and philanthropist, funded Robinson College, Cambridge and Rosie Hospital.
- Ferdinand Maria von Senger und Etterlin, 63, Nazi German soldier, general in the post-war Bundeswehr.

=== 11 ===
- Albert Ferber, 75, Swiss pianist.
- Hugo Fregonese, 78, Argentinian film director and screenwriter (My Six Convicts), heart attack.
- Betty von Fürer-Haimendorf, 75–76, British ethnologist in India and Nepal.
- Jacques Hérold, 76, Romanian surrealist painter.

=== 12 ===
- William Craner, 80, British Olympic sprinter (1928).
- Harold Krents, 42, blind American lawyer, author and activist, brain tumour.
- Ralph Maxwell Lewis, 82, American mystic, Imperator of the Ancient Mystical Order Rosae Crucis.
- Norah Michener, 84–85, Canadian wife of Roland Michener, Governor General of Canada, Alzheimer's disease.
- Glenn Odekirk, 81, American aerospace engineer, cancer.
- Herbert Tiede, 71, German actor.

=== 13 ===
- Vladimir Alatortsev, 77, Soviet chess player, author and administrator.
- Alfred Young Allee, 81, American Texas ranger, sheriff and game warden, cancer.
- Thomas Davidson, 80, South African cricketer.
- Anatoly Efros, 61, Soviet theatre and film director, heart attack.
- Charlotte Friend, 65, American virologist, noted for her discovery of the Friend leukemia virus.
- Matt Hazeltine, 53, American NFL footballer (San Francisco 49ers), Lou Gehrig's disease.
- Igor Ilyinsky, 85, Soviet stage and film actor, director and comedian.
- Edward D. Kuekes, 85, American editorial cartoonist.
- Tom Morgan, 56, American MLB player.
- Elvira Ríos, 73, Mexican singer ("Noche de ronda", "Perfidia") and actress, kidney failure and bladder cancer.
- Tony Sansone, 81, Italian-American bodybuilder and model, colon cancer.
- Geoffrey Tiarks, 77, British Anglican bishop.

=== 14 ===
- Alister Clark, 83, Irish Olympic hurdler (1928).
- Warwick Oswald Fairfax, 85, Australian businessman and journalist.
- Desmond FitzGerald, 75, Irish architect, designer of original Dublin Airport terminal building.
- Park Jong-chul, 21, South Korean democracy movement activist, death by torture.
- Gerald C. MacCallum Jr., 61, American philosopher, heart attack.
- Douglas Sirk, 89, German-born film director (A Time to Love and a Time to Die).
- Rauli Somerjoki, 39, Finnish rock singer, bronchitis.
- Jai Ram Varma, 82, Indian freedom fighter and politician, Member of Parliament.
- Sam Wagstaff, 65, American art curator and collector, pneumonia.
- James Wright, 74, English cricketer.

=== 15 ===
- Carl-Fredrik Algernon, 61, Swedish Navy officer, hit by train.
- Harald Bode, 77, German engineer, pioneer in the development of electronic musical instruments.
- Ray Bolger, 83, American actor, singer and dancer, the Scarecrow in The Wizard of Oz, bladder cancer.
- Rudolf Carl, 87, Austrian actor.
- Jim Champion, 61, American football player and coach.
- José Antonio Gallardo, 25, Spanish footballer (Málaga), cardiac arrest following injury in game.
- Dolores Hawkins, 57, American rhythm and blues singer.
- Tom Joyce, 85, Australian rules footballer.
- George Markstein, 60, British journalist and writer (The Prisoner).
- Ed Nicholson, 63, Canadian ice hockey player (Detroit Red Wings).
- John Alexander Fraser Roberts, 87, Welsh geneticist and psychiatrist.
- Heather Thatcher, 90, English actress in theatre and films.
- Philip Young, 76, American government official and diplomat, U.S. Ambassador to the Netherlands, heart attack.

=== 16 ===
- Achankunju, 56, Indian actor.
- Arthur Drexler, 61, American museum curator, director of the Museum of Modern Art, pancreatic cancer.
- Rolando Hammer, 65, Chilean Olympic basketball player (1948).
- Joyce Jameson, 59, American actress (The Andy Griffith Show, The Apartment), suicide.
- Lita McClinton, 35, American socialite and murder victim.
- Colin Scrimgeour, 83, New Zealand Methodist minister and broadcaster.
- V. Viswanathan, 77, Indian ICS officer, Governor of Kerala, Lieutenant Governor of Himachal Pradesh.
- Bertram Wainer, 58, Australian doctor, campaigned for legal access to abortion in Victoria, heart attack.
- Earl Wilson, 79, American journalist and author, stroke.

=== 17 ===
- Aram Avakian, 60, American film editor and director, heart failure.
- Ed Busch, 69, American MLB player (Philadelphia Athletics).
- Mario Checcacci, 76, Italian Olympic rower (1936).
- Harry Darby, 91, American politician, U.S. Senator (1949-1950).
- Dudjom Jigdral Yeshe Dorje, 82, Tibetan Buddhist leader.
- Lawrence Kohlberg, 59, American psychologist, suicide.
- Jozo Penava, 77, Bosnian-Herzegovinian music producer, composer and vocalist.
- Fazil Rahu, 52–53, Pakistani political leader, assassinated.
- Gu Zhutong, 94, Chinese military general, Chief of the General Staff of the Republic of China Armed Forces.

=== 18 ===
- Sergio Blažić, 35, Croatian hard rock musician (Atomsko Sklonište), Hodgkin's disease.
- Esmail Daghayeghi, 32–33, Iranian military commander, missile strike.
- Renato Guttuso, 75, Italian painter and politician, member of the Senate, cancer.
- Sigurd Herbern, 86, Norwegian Olympic sailor (1936).
- Thomas Jameson, 78, English cricketer.
- Helen Block Lewis, 73, American psychiatrist and psychoanalyst, cancer.
- Lauro Salas, 58, Mexican lightweight boxer and world champion.
- George Thalben-Ball, 90, Australian-born English organist and composer.
- William Woodward, 66, Australian Olympic rower (1948).

=== 19 ===
- Max Bly, 81, American Olympic bobsledder (1936).
- Gerald Brenan, 92, Maltese-born writer of British descent who lived mostly in Spain, heart failure.
- Humphrey Edwardes-Jones, 81, British RAF commander.
- Norman Ella, 76, Australian Olympic rower (1936).
- Harry Keller, 73, American film editor and director.
- Ira C. Kepford, 67, American pilot with the U.S. Navy, flying ace in World War II.
- Dick Milford, 91, English clergyman.
- George Selkirk, 79, Canadian Major League baseball player (New York Yankees).
- Hermann Voss, 92, German anatomist, unpunished Nazi war criminal.

=== 20 ===
- Hank Behrman, 65, American MLB player (Brooklyn Dodgers, Pittsburgh Pirates, New York Giants).
- Tom Dollery, 72, English Test cricketer.
- Annie Fox, 93, Canadian-born American, first woman to receive the Purple Heart for combat.
- Hermann Giesler, 88, Nazi German architect.
- Charles Pasquale Greco, 92, American Roman Catholic Church bishop.
- Donald W. MacKinnon, 84, American psychologist and University of California professor.
- Thomas "Ta" Power, 33, Irish politician and paramilitary, shot.
- James L. Richardson, 77, American lieutenant general in the U.S. Army.
- Periyasaamy Thooran, 78, Indian Tamil poet, teacher and composer of Carnatic music.

=== 21 ===
- Jenny Aubry, 83, French psychiatrist and psychoanalyst.
- Nina Byron, 86, New Zealand-born American silent-screen actress and showgirl.
- David Cummings, 92, British Olympic athlete (1924).
- Victor Goddard, 89, British air marshal in the Royal Air Force during the Second World War.
- Charles Goodell, 60, American politician, member of U.S. House of Representatives and Senate, heart attack.
- Gordon Gore, 73, American NFL player (Detroit Lions).
- Ikki Kajiwara, 50, Japanese author, manga writer and film producer.

=== 22 ===
- Barbro Alving, 78, Swedish journalist, writer and feminist.
- Georges Buchard, 93, French Olympic fencer (1924, 1928, 1932, 1936).
- Ann Parker Bowles, 68, British aristocrat and Girl Guides leader, mother-in-law of Queen Camilla.
- Zsófia Dénes, 102, Hungarian writer.
- R. Budd Dwyer, 47, American politician, suicide by gunshot.
- Stan Keon, 71, Australian politician, member of the Federal House of Representatives.
- Patrick du Val, 83, British mathematician (du Val singularity).

=== 23 ===
- Ben-Zion, 89, Russian-born American painter, sculptor and poet, heart attack.
- E. Nelson Bridwell, 55, American writer for Mad magazine and DC Comics, lung cancer.
- Per Cederblom, 85, Swedish Olympic swimmer (1920).
- Sergei Chernikov, 74, Russian mathematician.
- Asim Ferhatović, 53, Bosnian footballer (Sarajevo, Yugoslavia), heart attack.
- William Howell, 85, Australian cricketer.
- Neo Chwee Kok, 55, Singaporean Olympic swimmer (1952).
- Gregor Strniša, 56, Slovenian poet, playwright and songwriter.

=== 24 ===
- Norman Dodd, 87, American banker.
- Tetsuji Murakami, 59, Japanese karate representative to Europe.
- Mario Sánchez, 60, Mexican Olympic footballer (1948).
- Imre Szentpály, 82, Hungarian Olympic polo player (1936).
- Clara Thalmann, 78, Swiss journalist, athlete and militia woman who fought during the Spanish Civil War.

=== 25 ===
- William Devlin, 75, Scottish film and television actor.
- Julian Hoke Harris, 80, American sculptor.
- Emil Hlobil, 85, Czech composer and music professor.
- Henry Krips, 74, Austrian-Australian conductor and composer (South Australian Symphony Orchestra).
- Sven Lindqvist, 83, Swedish Olympic footballer (1924).
- Nahuel Moreno, 62, Argentinian Trotskyist leader.
- Mihrişah Sultan, 70, Ottoman princess, daughter of heir to the throne Şehzade Yusuf Izzeddin.
- Piero Vida, 48, Italian film actor.

=== 26 ===
- Earl Bartlett, 78, American NFL player (Pittsburgh Pirates).
- Adolf Ciborowski, 67, Polish architect, urban planner and politician.
- Mollie Maureen, 82, Irish actress.
- Charles Wolcott, 80, American music composer.

=== 27 ===
- Norene Arnold, 59, American AAGPBL player.
- Allan V. Cox, 60, American geophysicist (geomagnetic reversal), suicide.
- Allison Danzig, 88, American sportswriter, heart attack.
- Horace Hall Edwards, 84, American politician, member of the Virginia House of Delegates (1934-1940).
- Geoffrey Charles Evans, 86, English lieutenant general in the British Army.
- Samuel G. Fuqua, 87, American rear admiral of the U.S. Navy, Medal of Honor recipient.
- Antanas Maceina, 79, Lithuanian philosopher and poet.
- Norman McLaren, 72, Scottish-born Canadian animator and director, heart attack.
- Ralph G. Neppel, 63, American soldier in the U.S. Army, Medal of Honor recipient.
- Liesl Perkaus, 81, Austrian Olympic athlete (1928).
- Ove Rainer, 61, Swedish civil servant and politician.
- Richard Sapir, 50, American author (The Destroyer), heart attack.
- Gus Zitrides, 71, American college football player and coach.

=== 28 ===
- Gangadhar V. Chittal, 63, Indian Kannada poet, Parkinson's disease.
- George Dow, 79, British railway employee and author.
- Ralph Faulkner, 95, American fencer, film actor and Olympian (1932).
- Galo Plaza, 80, Ecuadorian statesman, President of Ecuador, heart attack.
- Valerian Trifa, 72, Romanian Orthodox cleric and fascist political activist, heart attack.

=== 29 ===
- Carlo Cassola, 69, Italian novelist and essayist (La Ragazza di Bube), heart attack.
- Emvin Cremona, 67, Maltese artist and stamp designer.
- Mounir Abou Fadel, 74, Lebanese politician, Deputy Speaker of the Parliament of Lebanon.
- George Flamank, 82, American college football and basketball coach.
- Josep Vicenç Foix, 94, Spanish Catalan poet, writer and essayist.
- Werner Heilig, 65, German footballer.
- Vincent R. Impellitteri, 86, Italian-American politician and judge, Mayor of New York City, heart failure.
- Gerhard Klopfer, 81, German Nazi Party official and chief deputy of Martin Bormann.
- Princess Pilar of Bavaria, 95, German Royal, only daughter of Prince Ludwig Ferdinand of Bavaria.
- Eva Primrose, 94, English daughter of Henry Bruce, 2nd Baron Aberdare.
- Peter Zivic, 85, American Olympic boxer (1920).

=== 30 ===
- Dionysios Arbouzis, appr. 74, Greek Hellenic Army general.
- Johnnie Cradock, 82, English cook, writer and broadcaster.
- Ken Drake, 65, American film and television actor.
- Virgil Eikenberg, 62, American NFL player (Chicago Cardinals).
- Ante Topić Mimara, 88, Croatian art collector.
- Tony Tonelli, 69, American NFL player (Detroit Lions).
- Héctor Varela, 73, Argentinian tango bandoneónist, bandleader and composer.

=== 31 ===
- Yves Allégret, 81, French film director.
- Julian Antonisz, 45, Polish filmmaker, artist and composer.
- Idris Barzani, 42–43, Kurdish politician, heart attack.
- Julius C. Daugherty Sr., 63, American politician, member of the Georgia House of Representatives (1966-1986).
- Joseph Jastine, 78, Belgian Olympic field hockey player (1928).
- Tadeusz Krzyżanowski, 66, Polish Olympic shot putter (1952).
- Jorge Peñaloza, 64, Chilean footballer.
- Edmund J. Pendleton, 87, American composer and musician.

=== Unknown date ===
- Delano Ames, 80–81, American writer of detective stories.
- Pierre Chapo, 59, French furniture designer and craftsman, Lou Gehrig's disease.
- Don Levy, 54–55, Australian-born artist and filmmaker, suicide.
- Atholl Oakeley, 86, British wrestler and wrestling promoter.
- Saul Tepper, 87, American illustrator and songwriter.
