= James Wright =

James, Jimmy, or Jim Wright may refer to:

== Arts and entertainment ==
- James Wright (poet) (1927–1980), American poet
- James Wright (singer), Filipino-Australian singer
- Big Jim Wright (James Quentin Wright) (1966–2018), American musician
- Jimmy Wright (actor), American stage and screen actor
- Jimmy Wright (artist) (born 1944), American visual artist

== Politics and the law ==
=== United States ===
- James Wright (governor) (1716–1785), British colonial governor of the province of Georgia, and 1st Baronet, of Carolside
- J. Skelly Wright (1911–1988), American judge
- James A. Wright (Pennsylvania politician) (1902–1963), U.S. Congressman from Pennsylvania
- James A. Wright (Wisconsin politician) (1873–1911), Wisconsin politician and businessman
- James Henry Wright (1838–1905), American jurist and politician
- James L. Wright (1925–1990), Pennsylvania politician
- Jim Wright (1922–2015), U.S. Congressman from Texas, Speaker of the House
- Jim Wright (commissioner), American politician and businessman from Texas

=== Elsewhere ===
- Sir James Wright (governor) (1716–1785), British colonial governor of the province of Georgia, and 1st Baronet, of Carolside
- Sir James Wright, 1st Baronet (1730–1804) of Ray House, Essex and Resident at Venice, British diplomat
- James Wright (Jamaican politician) (1904–1984/85), member of the Legislative Council of Jamaica
- James R. Wright, Canadian diplomat
- James William Wright (1854–1917), Australian architect and politician

== Science and academics ==
- James Wright (classicist) (born 1939), former Vice-Chancellor, Newcastle University
- James Wright (historian) (1939–2022), President of Dartmouth College, historian
- James Wright (palaeontologist) (1878–1957), Scottish palaeontologist, geologist and fossil collector
- James C. Wright (born 1946), American classical archaeologist
- James D. Wright (1947–2019), American sociologist

== Sports ==
=== Baseball ===
- Jim Wright (1920s pitcher) (1900–1963), Major League Baseball pitcher
- Jim Wright (1970s pitcher) (born 1950), Major League Baseball pitcher
- Jim Wright (1980s pitcher) (born 1955), Major League Baseball pitcher

=== Cricket ===
- James Wright (cricketer, born 1948), English cricketer
- James Wright (cricketer, born 1874) (1874–1961), English cricketer
- James Wright (cricketer, born 1912) (1912–1987), English cricketer
- James Wright (New Zealand cricketer) (born 1936), New Zealand cricketer

=== Gridiron football ===
- James Wright (tight end) (born 1956), American football tight end
- James Wright (wide receiver) (born 1991), American football player
- James Earl Wright (American football) (1939–2009), gridiron football defensive back and quarterback
- Jim Wright (American football coach) (1935–2025), American football coach

=== Other sports ===
- James Wright (footballer) (born 2004), English footballer for Aston Villa
- Jim Wright (footballer, born 1910) (1910–1978), English footballer
- James Leroy Wright (1938–2020), American basketball player
- Jimmy Wright (golfer) (born 1939), American professional golfer
- James Wright (ice hockey) (born 1990), Canadian ice hockey player
- James Wright (rugby) (1863–1932), rugby union footballer of the 1890s for England, and Bradford F.C.
- James Wright (speedway rider) (born 1986), British motorcycle speedway rider
- Jim Wright (Australian footballer) (born 1949), Australian rules footballer (Geelong)
- James Earl Wright, a ring name of American professional wrestler Dale Veasey (born 1960)

== Other fields ==
- James Wright (antiquarian) (1643–1713), antiquary and writer
- James Wright (doctor) (1927–2022), Australian medical professional
- James Wright (inventor) (1874–1961), American creator of Silly Putty
- James Wright (potter) (1819–1887), New Zealand potter
- James Homer Wright (1869–1928), American pathologist
- James Hood Wright (1836–1894), American banker, financier and railroad man
- James W. Wright, executive director of the Development Authority of the North Country
- James Whitaker Wright (1846–1904), English mining company owner
- James William Wright (1854–1917), Australian architect and politician

== See also ==
- Jamey Wright (born 1974), baseball player
- Jamie Wright (born 1976), ice hockey player
- Jay Wright (disambiguation)
- Cottage Grove State Airport or Jim Wright Field, Lane County, Oregon, USA
