= Political freedom =

Concept in history and political thought

Political freedom, also called political autonomy or political agency, is a central concept in history and political thought and one of the most important features of democratic societies. Political freedom has been described as freedom from oppression or coercion, the absence of disabling conditions for an individual and the fulfillment of enabling conditions, or the absence of life conditions of compulsion in society, such as economic compulsion.

Although political freedom is often interpreted negatively as the freedom from unreasonable external constraints on action, it can also refer to the positive exercise of rights, capacities and possibilities for action and the exercise of social or group rights. The concept can also include freedom from internal constraints on political action or speech such as social conformity, consistency, or inauthentic behaviour. The concept of political freedom is closely connected with the concepts of civil liberties and human rights, which in democratic societies are usually afforded legal protection from the state.

== Views ==
Various groups along the political spectrum hold different views about what they believe constitutes political freedom.

Left-wing political philosophy generally couples the notion of freedom with that of positive liberty or the enabling of a group or individual to determine their own life or realize their own potential. In this sense, freedom may include freedom from poverty, starvation, treatable disease, and oppression as well as freedom from force and coercion, from whomever they may issue.

According to neoliberal philosopher and economist Friedrich Hayek, the "socialist argument" defined "individual liberty" as " 'freedom from' obstacles". He argued that this definition only "confused" and obscured the aim of "securing individual freedom", because it permitted a possible "identification of freedom with power." The subsequent "collective power over circumstances" misappropriated "the physical 'ability to do what I want', the power to satisfy our wishes, or the extent of the choice of alternatives open to us." Hayek maintained that once any possible "identification of freedom with power is admitted," a "totalitarian state" coalesced where "liberty has been suppressed in the name of liberty."

Social anarchists see negative and positive liberty as complementary concepts of freedom. Such a view of rights may require utilitarian trade-offs, such as sacrificing the right to the product of one's labor or freedom of association for less racial discrimination or more subsidies for housing. Social anarchists describe the negative liberty-centric view endorsed by capitalism as "selfish freedom".

Political philosopher Alasdair MacIntyre theorized freedom in terms of our social interdependence with other people.

Economist Milton Friedman argues in his book Capitalism and Freedom that there are two types of freedom, namely political freedom and economic freedom, and that without economic freedom there cannot be political freedom.

In his article "Why the Market Subverts Democracy", Robin Hahnel takes issue with Friedman's concept of economic freedom, asserting that there will be infringements on the freedom of others whenever anyone exercises their own economic freedom. He argues that such infringements produce conflicts that are resolved through property rights systems, and therefore it is essential to decide what is a better or a worse property rights system, yet Friedman simply takes for granted the existing property rights and does not question them.

Political philosopher Nikolas Kompridis posits that the pursuit of freedom in the modern era can be broadly divided into two motivating ideals, namely freedom as autonomy or independence and freedom as the ability to cooperatively initiate a new beginning.

Political freedom has also been theorized in its opposition to and a condition of power relations, or the power of action upon actions, by Michel Foucault. It has also been closely identified with certain kinds of artistic and cultural practice by Cornelius Castoriadis, Antonio Gramsci, Herbert Marcuse, Jacques Rancière and Theodor Adorno.

Environmentalists often argue that political freedoms should include some constraint on use of ecosystems. They maintain there is no such thing, for instance, as freedom to pollute or freedom to deforest given that such activities create negative externalities, which violates other groups' liberty to not be exposed to pollution. The popularity of SUVs, golf and urban sprawl has been used as evidence that some ideas of freedom and ecological conservation can clash. This leads at times to serious confrontations and clashes of values reflected in advertising campaigns, e.g. that of PETA regarding fur.

John Dalberg-Acton stated: "The most certain test by which we judge whether a country is really free is the amount of security enjoyed by minorities."

Gerald C. MacCallum Jr. spoke of a compromise between positive and negative freedoms, saying that an agent must have full autonomy over themselves. In this view, freedom is a triadic relationship because it is about three things, namely the agent, the constraints they need to be free from and the goal they are aspiring to.

== History ==
Hannah Arendt traces the conceptual origins of freedom to ancient Greek politics. According to her study, the concept of freedom was historically inseparable from political action. Politics could only be practiced by those who had freed themselves from the necessities of life so that they could participate in the realm of political affairs. According to Arendt, the concept of freedom became associated with the Christian notion of freedom of the will, or inner freedom, around the 5th century CE and since then freedom as a form of political action has been neglected even though, as she says, freedom is "the raison d'être of politics".

Arendt says that political freedom is historically opposed to sovereignty or will-power since in ancient Greece and Rome the concept of freedom was inseparable from performance and did not arise as a conflict between the will and the self. Similarly, the idea of freedom as freedom from politics is a notion that developed in modern times. This is opposed to the idea of freedom as the capacity to "begin anew", which Arendt sees as a corollary to the innate human condition of natality, or our nature as "new beginnings and hence beginners".

In Arendt's view, political action is an interruption of automatic process, either natural or historical. The freedom to begin anew is thus an extension of "the freedom to call something into being which did not exist before, which was not given, not even as an object of cognition or imagination, and which therefore, strictly speaking, could not be known".

== See also ==
- Academic freedom
- Civil and political rights
- Decentralization
- Dissident
- Economic freedom
- Freedom from unreasonable searches and seizures, which is related to right to privacy
- Freedom House
- Freedom of assembly
- Freedom of association
- Freedom of information
- Freedom of movement
- Freedom of religion
- Freedom of speech
- Freedom of the press
- Freedom of thought
- Global Social Change Research Project
- Internet censorship
- Libertarianism (disambiguation)
- List of indices of freedom
- Negative and positive rights
- Political censorship
- Political equality
- Political prisoner
- Political repression
- Right to keep and bear arms
- Scientific freedom
- Suffrage
- Two Treatises of Government
