= Max Ewing =

American photographer (1903–1934)

Max Ewing, Self Portrait in Evening Wear, 1932. Max Ewing Papers, Beinecke Rare Book and Manuscript Library, Yale University.

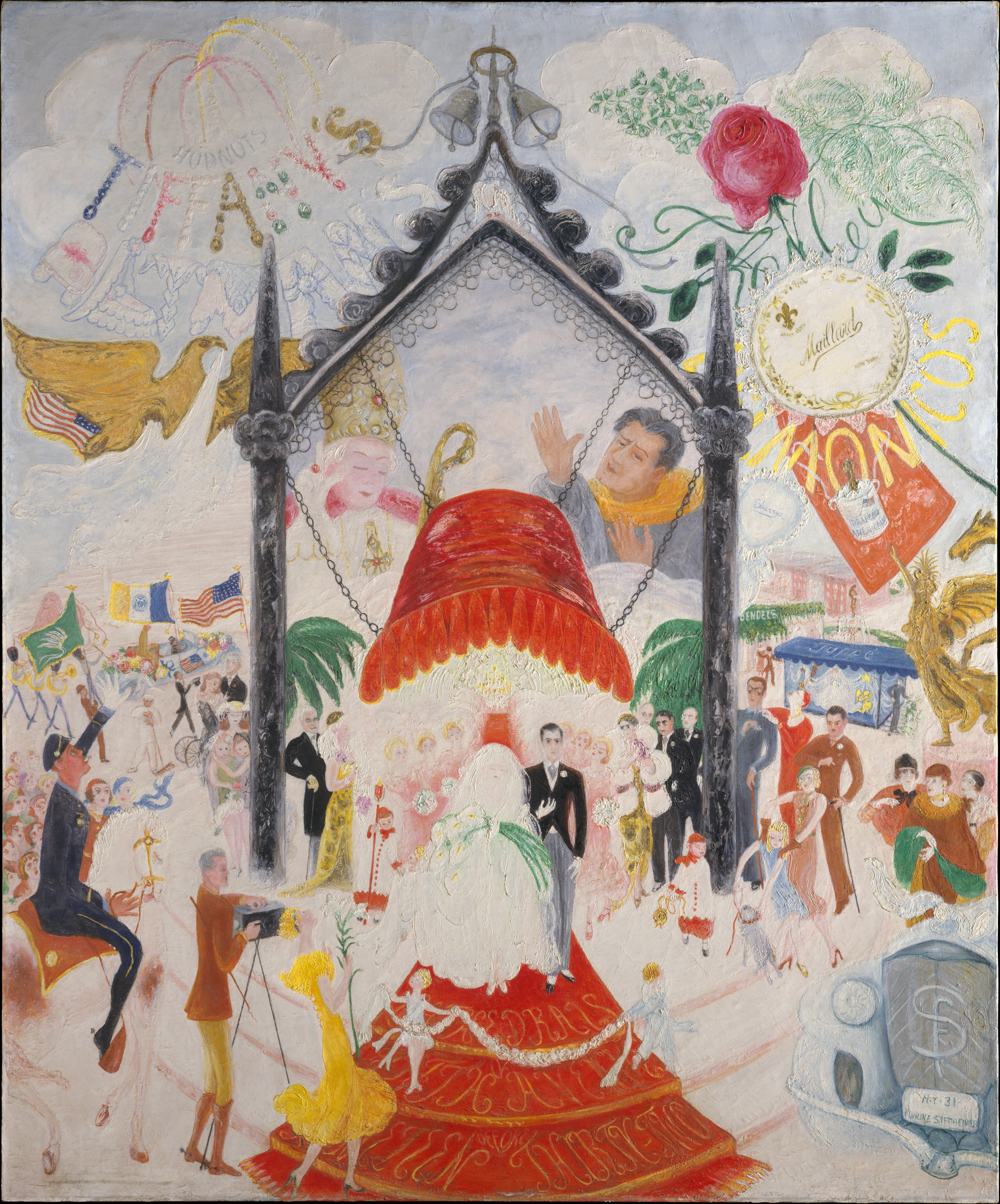
Ewing is depicted in this painting by Florine Stettheimer, The Cathedrals of Fifth Avenue (1931). Oil on canvas, 60 x 50 in. (152.4 x 127 cm). Metropolitan Museum of Art, New York. Gift of Ettie Stettheimer, 1953. 53.24.4.

Max Ewing (April 7, 1903 – June 16, 1934) was an American photographer, novelist, composer, pianist, and sculptor. He is best known for his photographs of his friends and contemporaries, including Muriel Draper, Paul Robeson, Berenice Abbott and George Platt Lynes. His most notable installations and photographic series include his 1928 exhibition, “Gallery of Extraordinary Portraits,” and the portrait series Carnival of Venice (also known as Les Amants du Venise). After his death, his photographs and papers were collected by Carl Van Vechten and donated to the Beinecke Rare Book and Manuscript Library at Yale University. The Max Ewing archive documents the life and experience of a queer young man in the urban and rural U.S. in the 1920s and ‘30s.

== Early life ==
On April 7, 1903, Ewing was born to John and Clara Ewing, prosperous owners of a dry-goods store, in Pioneer, Ohio. From an early age, Ewing displayed an interest in performance and fashion, creating stage sets and costumes for plays he put on in his family home, as well as designing evening gowns and fashionable dresses. He was also a talented and dedicated pianist. John and Clara were very supportive of their son, paying for his piano lessons, taking him to concerts, and organizing trips to the theater in Toledo and Detroit. From his letters, it is evident that Ewing always felt different than others in Pioneer, taking no interest in the ball games or teen dances that others his age participated in.

Ewing enrolled at the University of Michigan in Ann Arbor in 1920 to study music, psychology, and literature; in a letter to his parents, he wrote that he was “living outside [himself] more than [he] ever did before.” It was in college that he was introduced to the work of critic and author Carl Van Vechten, writing an appreciative review of his work that was published in the Michigan Daily News and later in the Detroit Free Press. He began corresponding with Van Vechten, who convinced him to drop out of college and devote himself to his music and writing.

== Life in New York ==
Ewing moved to New York City in September 1923. Financially supported by his parents, he rented a room at 152 East 22nd Street in Manhattan, where he was permitted to practice the piano at any time of day or night. He visited Van Vechten regularly and began studying piano with Russian pianist and Juilliard professor Alexander Siloti. He regularly sent letters to his parents, describing his new experiences in New York City, many made possible by his mentor, Van Vechten: “I have, now, entry, thru V. V. and others, to the most brilliant artistic circles in the most brilliant city in the world. I should be perfectly happy. I am. I hope you can feel this with me." He quickly fell into the New York avant-garde crowd, beginning with regular attendance at socialite Louise Hellstrom’s weekly parties, where he met luminaries such as artist Joseph Stella; composer Edgard Varèse; publisher Jane Heap; and artist Robert Winthrop Chanler (who notably painted portraits of Ewing in 1925 and 1928). Ewing also met the woman who would become his mentor and closest companion: writer and saloniste Muriel Draper. Ewing became a regular attendee of Draper’s salons and attended the opera, theater, and concerts with her. He photographed Draper regularly and even made a series of sculptures of her likeness.

Ewing’s letters to his parents, often written as many as four times per week over a ten-year period, indicate that he was relatively open with his parents about his sexuality from a young age, describing his crushes and hinting at his queer desires.

In 1926, Ewing left New York City for a trip around Europe, beginning in Paris. In letters home, he describes meeting many of his life-long idols, including twice attending salons at the home of Gertrude Stein and Alice B. Toklas. He became close friends with George Antheil, agreeing to play the difficult piano part in a 1927 concert of the composer’s Ballet Mécanique at Carnegie Hall in New York. However, the difficulty of the piece caused Ewing a permanent finger injury, ending his hopes of becoming a concert pianist.

Ewing met photographer George Platt Lynes at one of Muriel Draper’s salons in 1927, beginning a life-long friendship. Through Van Vechten, he became friends with writer Langston Hughes and singer Taylor Gordon. He also knew the arts patron A’Lelia Walker, attended gatherings at the Dark Tower, and kept up with the latest literary and cultural trends of the Harlem Renaissance.

In 1929, Ewing was introduced to Ettie, Carrie, and Florine Stettheimer, which invited him into the upper echelons of the New York art world. He is depicted in Florine Stettheimer’s famous painting, The Cathedrals of Fifth Avenue (1931–32).

== Photography and art work ==
Upon returning to New York from Europe in 1927, Ewing moved into a studio in the Life Building at 19 West 31st Street, where he began an ongoing exhibition in his walk-in closet of the ephemera collection he had amassed since childhood. The images on view included clippings from magazines and newspapers, celebrity portraits (many inscribed with personal messages to Ewing), and photographs taken by Abbott and others. Some of the largest images on display included photographs of nude and seminude men (including boxers Kid Chocolate and Max Schmeling and the bodybuilder Tony Sansone). Ewing privately produced a catalogue of the exhibition, entitled The Gallery of Extraordinary Portraits, with numbered entries for his friends to use to identify the subjects of the images on view—these included many inscribed photographs of Carl Van Vechten, as well as portraits of Marcel Proust, Oscar Wilde, Gertrude Stein, Taylor Gordon, and Sergei Diaghilev. From 1928 to 1933, the exhibition was ever-evolving, with Ewing frequently replacing portraits, adding new images by Van Vechten, and rearranging the photographs on the walls of the closet.

Beginning in 1929, Ewing created a series of sculptures of Muriel Draper; he hired photographer Ralph Steiner to document these works. Later sculptures of Draper from the summer of 1930 include elaborate full-figure depictions in mixed media. Gallerist Julien Levy included two of these sculptures in his 1932 Surréalisme show, exhibiting them alongside works by Pablo Picasso, Salvador Dalí, Max Ernst, Man Ray, Marcel Duchamp, and George Platt Lynes.

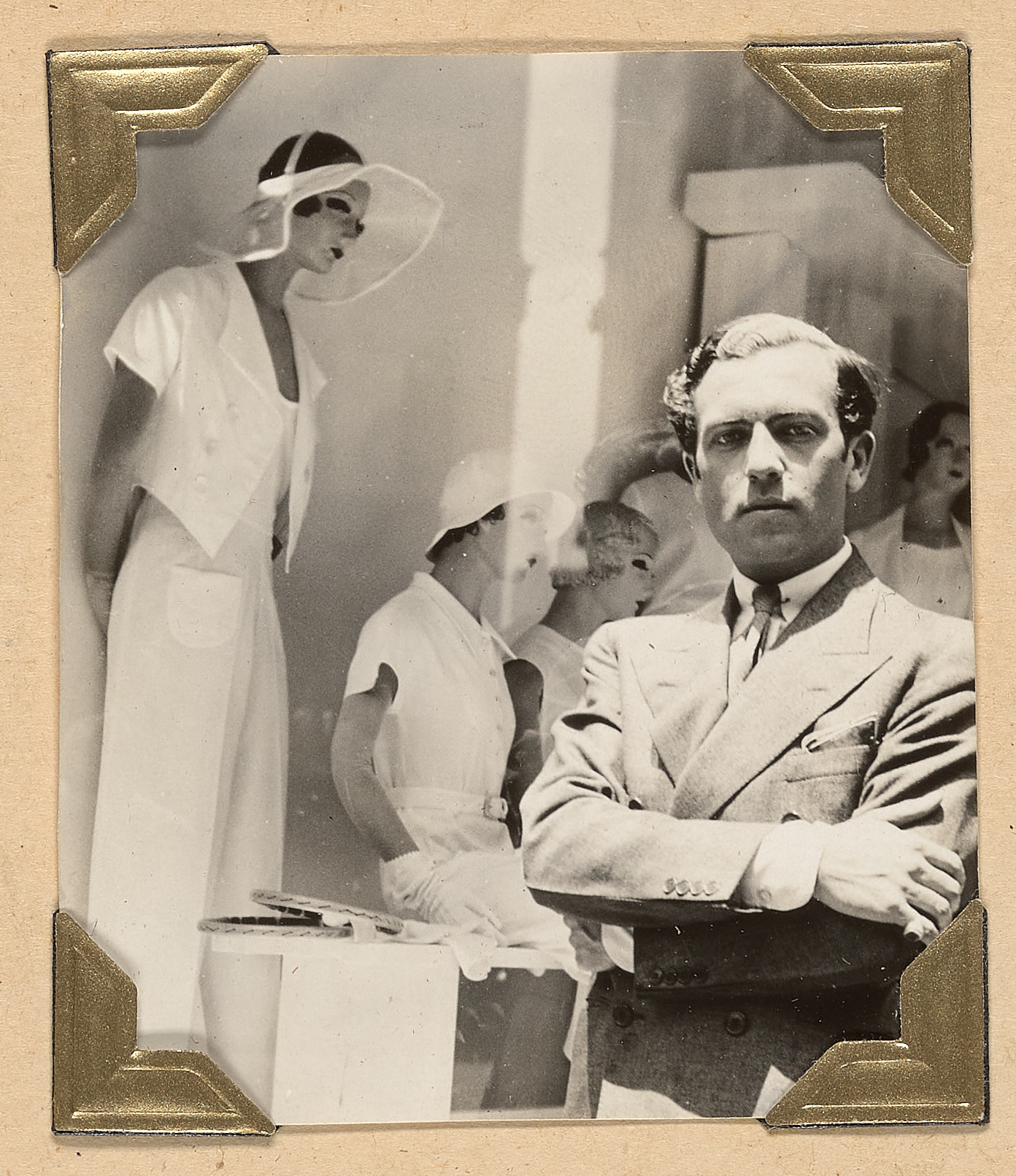
Snapshot of Max Ewing in New York City. July 10, 1932, taken from Snapshots 1932

In 1932, Ewing began his photography series The Carnival of Venice, consisting of Kodak photographs of his friends and acquaintances taken in front of a window shade painted with a scene of the Piazza San Marco. Among his subjects were Lincoln Kirstein, Lynes, Abbott, model Marion Morehouse, and artist Isamu Noguchi. Ewing created over one hundred such portraits over a ten-month period from April 1932 to January 1933. He printed the photographs in various sizes and displayed them in photo albums: these include a large volume of forty-eight portraits called The Carnival of Venice and four small albums entitled Les Amants de Venise and The International Festival of Venice. Ewing’s nude photographs were not displayed at the time, but many were preserved in Carl Van Vechten’s own homoerotic scrapbooks after Ewing’s death. Julien Levy staged a one-day exhibition of the series at his gallery on January 26, 1933, with an exhibition catalog introduced by writer Gilbert Seldes. Seldes wrote of the project, “The subjects came because he invited them and told them they could be whatever they liked in Venice. I doubt Mr. Ewing was trying to penetrate the subconscious desires of his subjects. I think that he wanted to make a series of entertaining and admirable photographs. In that endeavor, as in all his others, he has succeeded.” Critic Henry McBride wrote in his review of the show in the New York Sun that Ewing was “very subtle in choosing sitters and still more subtle in encouraging them to psychoanalyze themselves while posing.”

Inspired by the writing style of Carl Van Vechten, Ewing wrote a novel entitled Going Somewhere, published in 1933 by Alfred A. Knopf. Berenice Abbott took the photograph of Ewing for the book’s dust jacket in 1932, and Robert Locher designed the cover.

== Death and legacy ==
Ewing’s father died in April 1932. An event that led Ewing to move to Hollywood in 1933. He attempted to find work writing songs and film scripts for film studios but was unable to secure a job. His mother fell ill in 1934, and he returned home to Pioneer, Ohio, to care for her; she died in April of that year. His mental health precipitously declined as a result, and in spite of attempts from friends to support him, he drowned himself in the Susquehanna River on June 16th, 1934, at the age of 31, while on a car trip back to New York with boxer Jack Pollock.

After Max Ewing’s death, his friend Carl Van Vechten collected Ewing’s books, photographs, letters, and manuscripts and created an archive documenting his life and experience as a gay man in New York City and Pioneer, Ohio. Working alongside Ewing’s cousin Doris Ewing for over a decade, he assembled the Max Ewing Collection, donating it to the Beinecke Rare Book and Manuscript Library in the 1940s. Additions to these materials have been accessioned by the library as recently as 2023.

== Bibliography ==
- Ewing, Wallace K. (2012). Genius Denied: The Life and Death of Max Ewing. CreateSpace Independent Publishing Platform
- Friedman, Alice (2025). Queer Moderns: Max Ewing's Jazz Age New York. Princeton University Press.
- Friedman, Alice (2019). "Max Ewing's Closet and Queer Architectural History," Platform, October 8 and 21. Parts 1 and 2.
- Max Ewing Collection, YCAL 656, Archives at Yale, Beinecke Rare Book and Manuscript Library
