= SS Medical Corps =

Medical unit within the Nazi SS

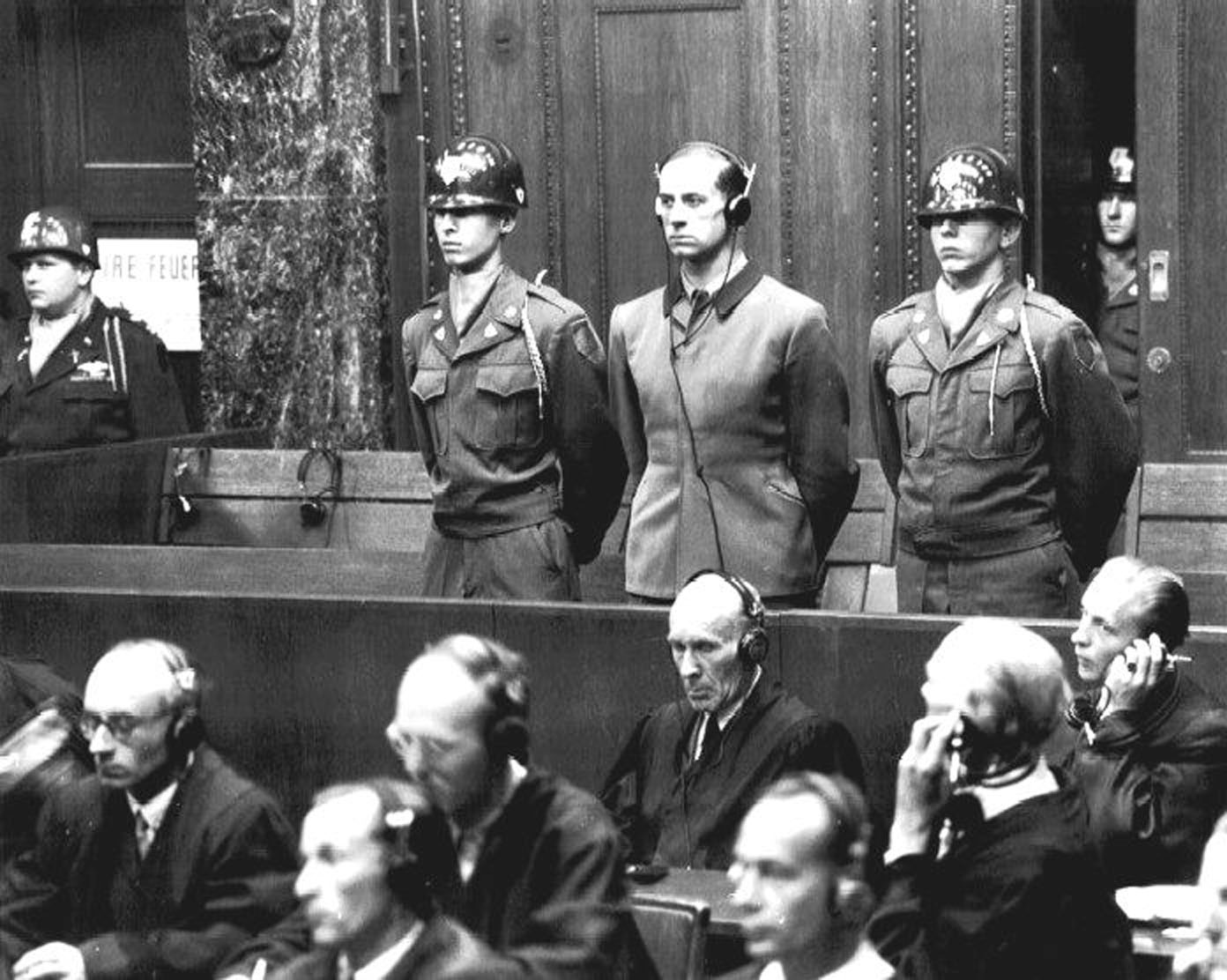
The U.S. War Crimes Tribunal sentence Adolf Hitler's personal physician, 43-year-old Karl Brandt, to death at the Doctors' Trial in August 1947. Brandt, who had been Reich Commisser for Health and Sanitation, was indicted with 22 other Nazi doctors and SS officers. The Tribunal found him guilty on all four counts charging him with conspiracy in aggressive wars, war crimes, crimes against humanity, and membership in the criminal SS organization. Among those criminal acts was his participating in and consenting to using concentration camp inmates as test subjects in medical experiments.

The SS Medical Corps was a formation within the SS of professional doctors who provided medical services for the SS, including experiments on and the development of different methods of murdering prisoners. Members of the SS Medical Corps also served on the front with the Waffen-SS as support personnel practicing field expedient medicine on wounded members of the SS.

== Formation ==
The first units of the SS Medical Corps began to appear in the 1930s. Small divisions of SS personnel designated to medical duties were known initially as the Sanitätsstaffel. These formations were originally small units under the command of local SS leaders. After 1931, the SS formed a headquarters office known as Amt V, which was the central office for SS medical units. At this same time, a special SS unit was formed known as the Röntgensturmbann SS-HA, or the Hauptamt X-Ray Battalion. This formation comprised 350 full-time SS personnel who toured Germany offering X-ray diagnostics to any SS member. While the Röntgensturmbann was an independent office, the local Sanitätsstaffel were under dual command of both the SS Medical Office (Amt V), and the leaders of the various SS-Sturmbann and Standarten. Within each SS-Sturmbann (battalion), there existed one company of SS personnel whose duty was to serve as medical support personnel to the rest of the SS battalion. Eventually these supporting units became the SS Medical Corps.

When the Nazis came to national power in 1933, the SS was reorganized and an office of the SS Surgeon General was established. Commanded by an SS-Obergruppenführer, the SS Surgeon General was a member of the personal staff of the Reichsführer-SS, with the SS Medical Corps, as a whole, losing the status of a headquarters office. This was an important development in changing the nature of service for members of the SS Medical Corps. By 1935, the SS Medical Corps was considered an "auxiliary duty", and all members of the medical corps were also attached to regular SS formations. To denote medical corps status, the SS authorized a serpent crest to be worn on the collar patches of SS unit insignia. Because SS Medical Corps members could now serve in any branch of the SS, this expansion allowed medical professionals to join every SS office and participate in a variety of duties.

== Exploitation and murder ==
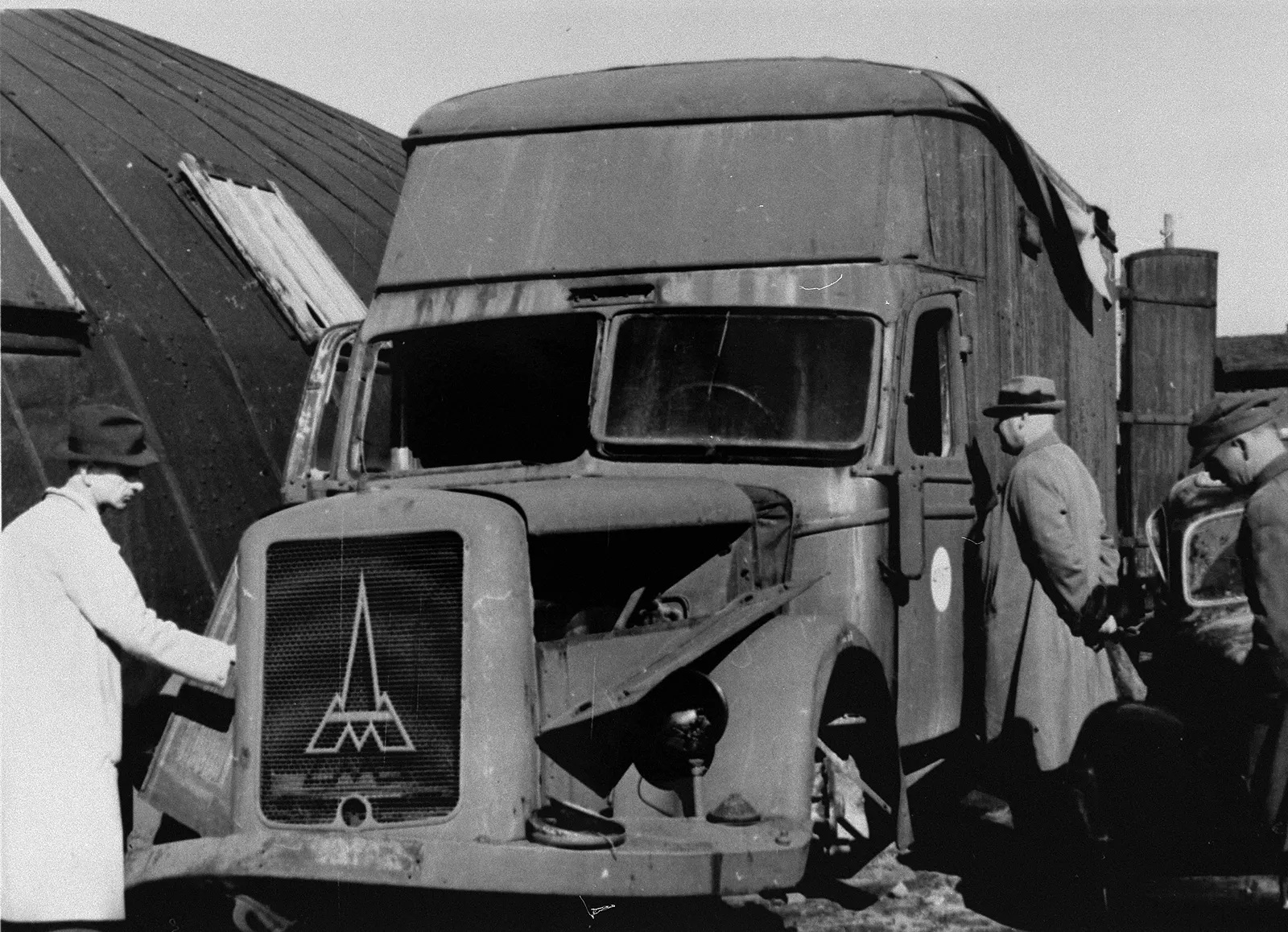
A damaged German Magirus-Deutz in 1945 at Kolno, Poland. Kolno was a transfer point for new victims deported from Łódź to Chełmno extermination camp. According to eyewitnesses, similar vans were used by the SS for mobile gassing, with the exhaust fumes diverted into the sealed rear compartment.

Between 1935 and 1938, the SS Medical Corps began to serve a more sinister purpose, with SS doctors assigned to concentration camps where they engaged in a variety of indescribably cruel human medical experiments. SS doctors were called upon in 1936 to assist with Germany's euthanasia program against the mentally disabled and physically handicapped in a program known confidentially as Operation T4. For example, they helped develop the first methods of gassing patients using carbon monoxide from the exhaust fumes of lorries (vans). Stemming from a secret memorandum signed into effect by Hitler authorizing the killing of "useless eaters" and people considered an economic burden on German society on 9 October 1939, Operation T4 eventually evolved into the Law for Euthanasia for the Incurably Ill. According to historian Götz Aly, the first commandants of the death camps at Belzec, Sobibor and Treblinka came out of Operation T4 and "were on its payroll."

In 1938, the SS formed its own Medical Academy in Berlin to train medical personnel and physicians who would serve with the SS-VT, the forerunner of the Waffen-SS. Doctors serving with the Waffen-SS were highly trained both in medical skills and combat tactics with many such doctors receiving high combat awards. During the war's progression, the Waffen-SS had a continuously developing structure for physicians which was highly complex, so sometime in August 1943, Himmler united all the medical branches of the SS and placed them under the command of Reicharzt-SS Ernst-Robert Grawitz, much like the Surgeon-General of the army.

Oftentimes personnel in the medical units of the SS performed duties not typically associated with traditional medicine as their primary responsibility once the war began was nothing less than the institutionalized medical genocide of anyone considered an enemy of the Nazi regime. People deemed inferior or undesirable became human guinea pigs and were exploited for scientific research by SS doctors as they conducted inhumane medical experiments at the camps. Human medical experiments, the most notorious of which occurred at Dachau concentration camp and Auschwitz reached their zenith during the war. Such experiments ranged from vivisections, sterilization experiments, infectious disease research, freezing experiments, as well as many other excruciating medical procedures often performed without anesthetic. During this period of time one of the most infamous SS doctors, Josef Mengele, served as Head Medical Officer of Auschwitz and was responsible for the daily gas chamber selections as well as brutal experiments (including those on human twins).

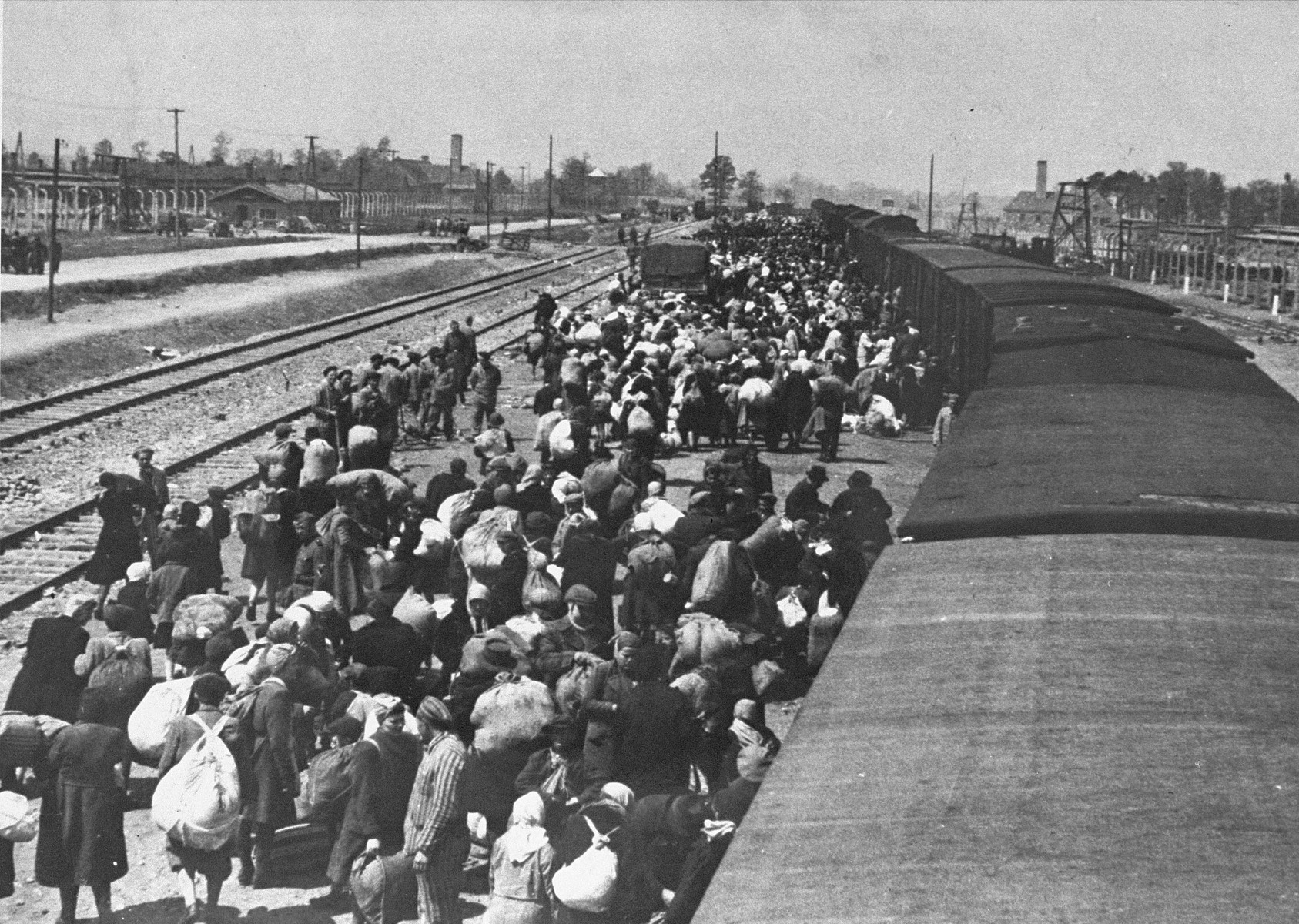
May 1944 - Jews from Carpathian Ruthenia arrive at Auschwitz-Birkenau

Another function that SS doctors served was to maximize the economic utility of slave labor at the concentration camps, aiding the SS industry and the Nazi cause through the exploitation of people and resources. Along those lines in December 1942, SS-Gruppenführer Richard Glücks (Inspector of Concentration Camps) sent a directive to the camp doctors telling them that, "The best doctor in a concentration camp is that doctor who holds the work capacity among inmates at its highest possible level. He does this through surveillance and through replacing [the sick or injured] at individual work stations... Toward this end it is necessary that the camp doctors take a personal interest and appear on location at work sites." (Note: Evidenced throughout the once objective and scholarly disciplines (even medicine) was a process of institutionalized Nazification, which created a permeability linking knowledge, political commitment, and the activity of National Socialist adherents together. Members of the SS Medical Corps were subject to this process, indicated by their duplicitous activities as practitioners of "medicine". Like their fellow SS members, those who participated in the ghastly work of exploiting and disposing of other human beings did so under the auspices of creating an idealized Aryan world.)

== Nuremberg trials ==
In 1945, after the surrender of Germany, the SS was declared an illegal criminal organization at the Nuremberg trial. SS doctors, in particular, were marked as war criminals due to the wide range of human medical experimentation which had been conducted during World War II as well as the role SS doctors had played in the gas chamber selections of the Holocaust. Later charges were brought against SS intellectuals and SS physicians by the German state. Many SS doctors, however, were never brought to justice with such figures as Josef Mengele escaping to Argentina while still other SS doctors returned to civilian practice in Germany under assumed names and in some cases, even their original identities. In the former East Germany for instance, Hermann Voss became a respected anatomist, while Eugen Wannenmacher obtained a post as a professor at the University of Münster and Mengele's former sponsor and mentor, Otmar Freiherr von Verschuer, continued operating his medical practice.

== See also ==
- Glossary of Nazi Germany
- List of SS personnel
- Theodor Eicke
