= Universities in Nazi Germany =

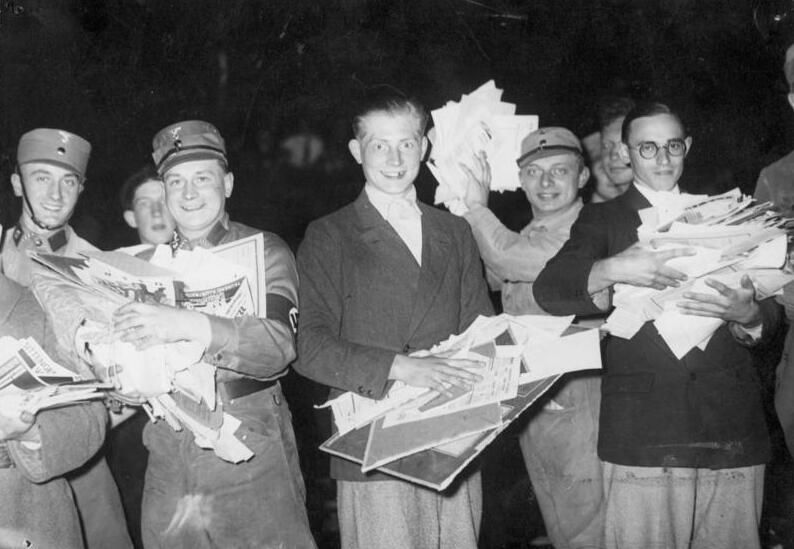
Public burning of un-German writings and books on Opernplatz in Berlin. Students and National Socialists at the Unter den Linden cremation site.

This article discusses universities in Nazi Germany. In May 1933 books from university libraries which were deemed culturally destructive, mainly due to anti-National Socialist or Jewish themes or authors, were burned by the Deutsche Studentenschaft (German Student Union) in town squares, e.g. in Berlin, and the curricula were subsequently modified. Martin Heidegger became the rector (and later head) of Freiburg University, where he delivered a number of National Socialist speeches and for example promulgated the Führerprinzip at the University on August 21, 1933.

== Background ==
=== Universities in the Weimar Republic ===
==== Science and Politics ====
In the Weimar Republic, there were key differences in higher education to that of the German Empire. Article 142 of the Weimar Constitution guaranteed freedom of research and teaching for the first time. Within the ministries of education, there was a partial change in personnel. From 1918–19 onward, these positions were filled not only by monarchists but also by party politicians from across the political spectrum. At the same time, the education system remained federal, and the universities essentially retained their existing legal structure.

To better financially support research and universities in general, governmental funding bodies were established in the Weimar Republic, like the Humboldt-Verein, (Humboldt Society) der Stiftungsverband für die deutsche Wissenschaft (Foundation Association for German Science) and die Notgemeinschaft der deutschen Wissenschaft (the Emergency Association of German Science). These primarily funded application-oriented projects. The research, some of which aimed at independence from certain raw materials and basic products, built upon the autarky efforts of the First World War, which continued uninterrupted until World War II.

==== Professors and students in the Weimar Republic ====
The professoriate was a small group: in 1925 there were 4,862 professors at the universities of the German Reich and 1,829 professors at the technical universities. However, due to their prominent position in society, they exerted a considerable influence, especially on the student body as the newly emerging elite.

With the end of the Wilhelmine Empire, many professors feared for their social status and prestige should the Soviet Union prevail. This was the sole reason why many professors initially supported the new form of government in the early stages of the Weimar Republic. However, this changed as early as 1919. From then on, most professors viewed the Republic with distance and criticism, and even open hostility. In their "aufrechten nationalen Gesinnung" (upright national sentiment), the professors glorified the Wilhelmine past.

The students' relationship to the republican state was varied, ranging from ambivalent reserve to outright contempt. While there was democratic potential, the vast majority associated the new state with Germany's defeat in World War I, which was widely perceived as a humiliation for the country. The anti-democratic subculture of Wilhelmine student fraternities was not banned, and the number of members in fraternities and other student associations rose sharply. Until 1925, the Völkisch and nationalist Hochschulring (University Ring) had an enormous influence on the universities. In 1927, an open break occurred between the students and the republic, whereupon the organized student body lost its state recognition. National Socialist German Students' League (NSDStB) "conquered" the universities. This movement was characterized by anti-rationalism, the myth of the front-line soldier, ethnic nationalism, anti-Semitism, and contempt for the Weimar party system. In the winter semester of 1929/30, the NSDStB (National Socialist German Students' League) achieved absolute majorities for the first time at the universities of Erlangen and Greifswald. In July 1931, it won an absolute majority in the elections of the 14th German Student Congress. Consequently, many students showed themselves to be receptive to National Socialist ideology early on and in a publicly effective manner.

== Well-known expelled professors ==
- Albert Einstein
- Max Born
- Fritz Haber
- Otto Fritz Meyerhof
- Theodor W. Adorno
- Martin Buber
- Ernst Bloch
- Max Horkheimer
- Ernst Cassirer
- Herbert Marcuse
- Lise Meitner
- Louis Hamilton, 1879–1948 (not Louis Kemppel Hamilton, 1890–1957)

== Austrian universities ==
The University of Vienna participated in National Socialism. Eduard Pernkopf (rector 1943–1945) compiled a "Topographical Anatomy of the Human Species". Hans Sedlmayr, a declared National Socialist, led an art institute throughout the war.

== Germanized universities ==
The first Reichsuniversität began operations in Prague on November 4, 1939.

The University of Poznań was closed by the German Occupation in 1939, and reopened on April 27, 1941 as Reichsuniversität Posen, a Grenzlanduniversität aligned with Nazi ideology. Its faculty included historian Reinhard Wittram and anatomist Hermann Voss. The German university ceased operations in 1944, and the University of Poznań reopened in 1945.

The University of Strasbourg was transferred to Clermont-Ferrand in 1939 and Reichsuniversität Straßburg existed from November 23, 1941 until the Allied recapture of the city in 1944. It was notably the site of medical experimentation on and murder of Jews and other concentration camp inmates led by the Dean of the Medical School, August Hirt.

== See also ==
- German Student Union
- National Socialist German Lecturers League
- National Socialist German Students' League
- Vow of allegiance of the Professors of the German Universities and High-Schools to Adolf Hitler and the National Socialistic State

== Sources ==
- John Connelly; Michael Grüttner, eds. (2005). Universities under dictatorship. University Park, PA: Pennsylvania State University Press. ISBN 9780271026954.
- Grüttner, Michael (2022). "The Expulsion of Academic Teaching Staff from German Universities, 1933–45". Journal of Contemporary History. 57 (3): 513–533. doi:10.1177/00220094211063074. S2CID 245419038.
- When books burn (web exhibit). University of Arizona Library. 2006. Retrieved 2019-05-07.
- Historiker im Nationalsozialismus... by Ingo Haar
- Wechsler, Patrick (1991). La Faculté de Medecine de la „Reichsuniversität Straßburg“ (1941-1945) à l’heure nationale-socialiste (in French), dissertation, University of Freiburg. Published online, 2005. Retrieved 2019-05-07. urn:nbn:de:bsz:25-freidok-18966
- Louis Hamilton, A British Scholar in Nazi Germany, 1933–1938, in Nigel Copsey (ed.), Journal of Comparative Fascist Studies, 2016.
- Hentschel, Klaus (ed. 1996) Physics and National Socialism. An Anthology of Primary Sources, Basel: Birkhäuser 1996. ISBN 978-3-0348-0202-4
- Teresa Wróblewska: Die Reichsuniversitäten Posen, Prag und Strassburg als Modelle nationalsozialistischer Hochschulen in den von Deutschland besetzten Gebieten, Marszalek, Toruń 2000. ISBN 83-7174-674-1
- “Louis Hamilton, a British academic and Canada specialist in Germany”, in William Keel (ed.), Yearbook of German-American Studies, 2008.
