= Libertarian liberalism =

Libertarian liberalism or libertarian liberal may refer to:

- Libertarian liberalism (political theory), a term used by Marxist philosopher Michel Clouscard to refer to a stage of capitalism
- Α rare synonym for right-libertarianism
- Α rare synonym for the position of libertarian Democrats

== See also ==
- Libertarianism
- Libertarianism (disambiguation)
- Liberalism
- Liberal (disambiguation)
- Civil libertarianism
- Social liberalism
