= Egerton Wright =

English cricketer and soldier

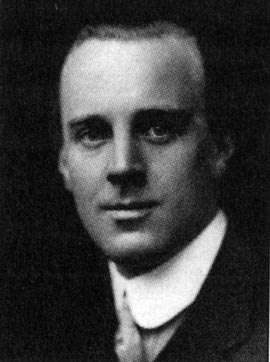

Personal information
- Full name: Egerton Lowndes Wright
- Born: 15 November 1885; Chorley, Lancashire, England
- Died: 11 May 1918 (aged 32); Barly, Somme, France
- Batting: Right-handed

Domestic team information
- Years: Team
- 1905 to 1908: Oxford University
- 1905 to 1910: Lancashire

Career statistics
Competition	First-class
Matches	37
Runs scored	1638
Batting average	24.81
100s/50s	0/10
Top score	95
Balls bowled	51
Wickets	1
Bowling average	40.00
5 wickets in innings	0
10 wickets in match	0
Best bowling	1/6
Catches/stumpings	26/3
- Source: Cricinfo, 25 November 2017

Egerton Lowndes Wright (15 November 1885 – 11 May 1918) was an English cricketer and soldier who played first-class cricket for Lancashire and Oxford University from 1905 to 1910.

Wright was born in Chorley, Lancashire, and educated at Winchester College and New College, Oxford. He appeared in 37 first-class matches as a right-handed batsman and occasional wicketkeeper. He scored 1638 runs with a highest score of 95 and held 26 catches with three stumpings.

He married Violet Shakespear in 1911. They had two children.

In World War I, Wright was a captain with the Oxfordshire and Buckinghamshire Light Infantry. He went to France in 1915 and served there with distinction, being awarded the Military Cross and twice mentioned in dispatches. He was killed in action near Barly, Somme, on 11 May 1918.
