= James Wright (cricketer, born 1912) =

English cricketer

Personal information
- Full name: James Egerton Lowndes Wright
- Born: 10 May 1912; London, England
- Died: 14 January 1987 (aged 74); Ashford Hill, Hampshire, England
- Batting: Right-handed
- Relatives: Egerton Wright (father)

Career statistics
Competition	First-class
Matches	1
Runs scored	48
Batting average	24.00
100s/50s	–/–
Top score	48
Balls bowled	–
Wickets	–
Bowling average	–
5 wickets in innings	–
10 wickets in match	–
Best bowling	–
Catches/stumpings	1/–
- Source: Cricinfo, 6 April 2012

James Egerton Lowndes Wright (10 May 1912 – 14 January 1987) was an English cricketer. Wright was a right-handed batsman. He was born at London.

Educated at Winchester College, he progressed from the college cadet force to enlist in the London Regiment as a 2nd Lieutenant. In 1935 he gained promotion to Lieutenant in the same regiment. In 1937, Wright made a single first-class appearance for the Free Foresters against Oxford University at the University Parks. In a match which Oxford University won by ten wickets, Wright batted twice, scoring 48 runs in the Free Foresters first-innings before being dismissed by Bill Murray-Wood, while in their second-innings he was dismissed for a duck by David Macindoe.

He died at Ashford Hill, Hampshire on 14 January 1987. His father Egerton Wright also played first-class cricket.
