= Ted Thorndike =

American ice hockey player

Personal information
- Nationality: American
- Born: September 8, 1952 Boston, Massachusetts, United States
- Died: January 2, 1987 (aged 34) Brookline, Massachusetts, United States

Sport
- Sport: Ice hockey

Ted Thorndike (September 8, 1952 – January 2, 1987) was an American ice hockey player. He competed in the men's tournament at the 1976 Winter Olympics.
