= Harold Krents =

American blind lawyer (1944/45–1987)

Harold Eliot "Hal" Krents (1944–45 — January 12, 1987) was a blind American lawyer, author, and activist. He became known for the two movies based on his life: To Race the Wind, based on his autobiography, and Butterflies Are Free based on a play of the same name.

== Early life ==
Krents grew up in Scarsdale, New York. He was legally blind from birth but completely lost his limited vision at the age of nine when his retinas detached after a football injury. When the local school would no longer allow him to attend, his mother learned braille herself and homeschooled him until the local school would accept him back into mainstream classes. He attended Scarsdale High School where he was a violinist in the school orchestra, and was president of the school's General Organization.

== Education ==
Krents attended Harvard College, where he majored in English. While living in Cambridge he learned to use a cane and cross busy intersections. Krents preferred to use volunteer readers, rather than Braille, to read his textbooks, as he found them faster and more flexible, and also it was a good way to make new acquaintances. After Harvard College, Krents attended Harvard Law School. During his first year at Harvard Law School Krents's draft status was reclassified to 1-A, meaning available to serve. Krents achieved viral fame for a humorous poem, "open letter to General Hershey" set to the tune of "On Top of Old Smoky" which he wrote in response to his draft notice, saying he was happy to serve his country, but hoped he could be a bombardier. The letter was printed in Esquire Magazine. After his Harvard degree he went on to earn another law degree at University College, Oxford.

In 1982 Krents received an honorary Doctor of Laws degree from the University of South Carolina.

== Career ==
After his two law degrees, Krents passed the New York Bar and worked for the Washington-based law firm of Surrey, Karasik & Morse, now Surrey & Morse, a firm which advocated for disability rights.

Krents was a supporter of the Rehabilitation Act of 1973.

In 1975, Krents founded Mainstream Inc., a nonprofit group that promoted the legal rights of disabled people.

Krents was a White House fellow during 1980 and 1981, and worked for Patricia Roberts Harris, the Secretary of Health, Education and Welfare.

From 1985 to 1986 he worked as a consultant to the Vera institute of Justice.

== Later life and death ==
Krents married Katherine "Kit" Williams and had three sons: James, Michael, and William. In 1977 he had a stroke that temporarily paralyzed him. Krents and his family lived in Washington DC, close to Georgetown hospital. Krents joked, "it's so easy to roll me over the hill to the emergency room... Saves a lot of time waiting for the ambulance." Krents died at age 42 on Jan 12, 1987 of a brain tumor in Calvary Hospital in the Bronx.

== Media portrayals ==
The Broadway comedy-drama play and subsequent movie, Butterflies Are Free, were inspired by Krents's life. Both the movie and play were written by Leonard Gershe. The 1972 movie was directed by Milton Katselas and starred Edward Albert as "Don," the character based on Krents and Goldie Hawn as his love interest, Jill.

Krents authored an autobiography, To Race the Wind, in 1972. To Race the Wind was adapted into a teleplay in 1980, directed by Walter Grauman and starring Steve Guttenberg as Harold Krents.
