= Barly, Somme =

Barly
- Commune
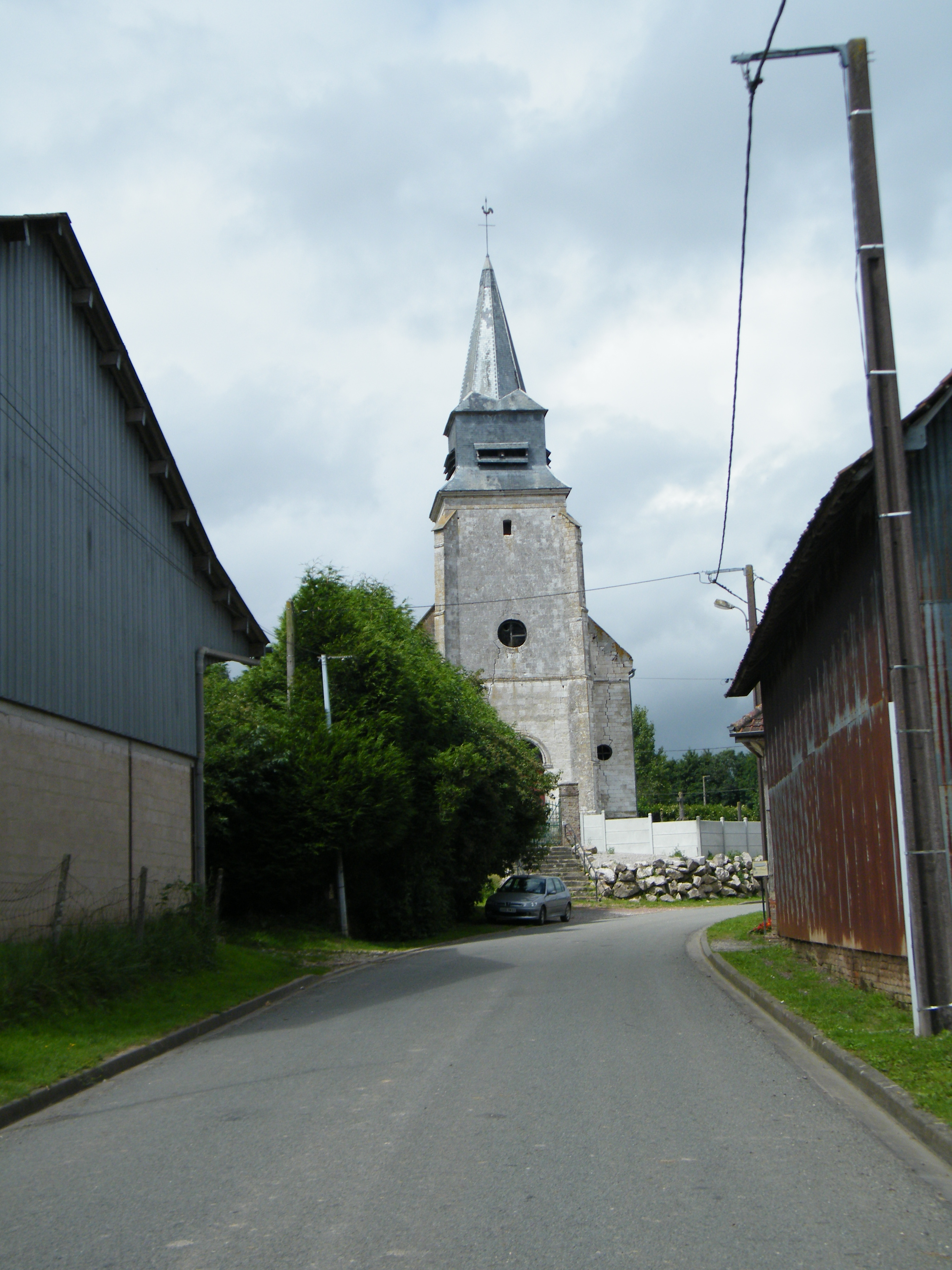
- The church in Barly
- Location of Barly
- Location within France Location within Hauts-de-France
- Coordinates: 50°12′10″N 2°16′29″E
- Country: France
- Region: Hauts-de-France
- Department: Somme
- Arrondissement: Amiens
- Canton: Doullens
- Intercommunality: CC Territoire Nord Picardie

Government
  - Mayor (2020–2026): Jean-Louis Bouchez
- Area^{1}: 11.64 km^{2} (4.49 sq mi)
- Elevation: 69 m (226 ft)
- Highest elevation: 156 m (512 ft)
- Lowest elevation: 47 m (154 ft)
- Population (2023): 161
  - Density: 13.8/km^{2} (35.8/sq mi)
- Time zone: UTC+01:00 (CET)
  - Summer (DST): UTC+02:00 (CEST)
- INSEE/Postal code: 80055 /80600
- ^{1} French Land Register data, which excludes lakes, ponds, glaciers > 1 km^{2} (0.386 sq mi or 247 acres) and river estuaries.

Barly (French pronunciation: [baʁli]) is a commune in the Somme department in Hauts-de-France in northern France.

== Geography ==
Situated halfway between Abbeville and Arras at the junction of the D59 and D196 roads and on the border of the departments of the Somme and the Pas-de-Calais.

== Population ==
Historical population
Year	Pop.	±% p.a.
1968	244	—
1975	219	−1.53%
1982	193	−1.79%
1990	189	−0.26%
1999	172	−1.04%
2007	153	−1.45%
2012	174	+2.61%
2017	177	+0.34%
2023	161	−1.57%
Source: INSEE

== See also ==
- Communes of the Somme department
