= James Wright (palaeontologist) =

Scottish geologist and palaeontologist

James Wright FRSE FGS (1878–1957) was a Scottish merchant remembered primarily as a palaeontologist, geologist and fossil collector.

He was an expert on the Lower Carboniferous crinoids of Scotland.

== Life ==
He was born in Kirkcaldy in Fife on 8 July 1878, the son of a relatively affluent furniture dealer in the town. He was educated locally at Kirkcaldy Burgh School and joined his father's firm aged around 14 or 15. It was later renamed Wright & Son.

On his father's death in 1917 he took over the company as Director. He retired in 1930 and in 1934 moved to Edinburgh. In 1933 he had been elected a Fellow of the Royal Society of Edinburgh due to his scientific contributions to the field of palaeontology. His proposers were Sir Edward Battersby Bailey, Murray Macgregor, John Pringle and George Walter Tyrrell. He won the Society's Neill Prize for the period 1937-39.

He died on 28 January 1957. He was unmarried and had no children.

Much of his fossil collection is now in the Hunterian Museum in Glasgow.

== Publications ==
- Scottish Carboniferous Crinoidea
- British Carboniferous Crinoidea
