= Libertarianism (disambiguation) =

Libertarianism is a political philosophy and movement that upholds liberty as the highest political end. This ideology may include:

- Civil libertarianism, a strain of political thought that emphasizes the supremacy of individual rights and personal freedoms over and against any kind of authority
- Left-libertarianism, a position contrasted with that of right-libertarianism which rejects the private ownership of natural resources
  - Anarchism, an anti-authoritarian and anti-statist philosophy for which some use the term libertarianism synonymously
  - Libertarian socialism, a group of philosophies which aspire to create a non-hierarchical society without private ownership of the means of production or an authoritarian state
- Right-libertarianism, a position contrasted with that of left-libertarianism for its explicit support of free-market capitalism and private property rights
  - Propertarianism, another name for right-libertarianism

Libertarianism may also refer to:

- Metaphysical libertarianism, philosophical position supporting free will against determinism
- Libertinism, sometimes called moral libertarianism and contrasted to political or social libertarianism and metaphysical libertarianism

== See also ==
- Libertarian Party (disambiguation)
- Libertarian liberalism (disambiguation), a term used variously by different scholars
