= William Howell (cricketer, born 1902) =

Australian cricketer

Personal information
- Born: 12 January 1902; Penrith, New South Wales, Australia
- Died: 23 January 1987 (aged 85); Penrith, New South Wales, Australia
- Source: ESPNcricinfo, 1 January 2017

William Howell (12 January 1902 – 23 January 1987) was an Australian cricketer. He played fourteen first-class matches for New South Wales between 1932/33 and 1935/36.

== See also ==
- List of New South Wales representative cricketers
