= Jim Wright (footballer, born 1910) =

English footballer

Personal information
- Full name: James Wright
- Date of birth: 11 September 1910
- Place of birth: Okehampton, England
- Date of death: 1978 (aged 67–68)
- Position: Full-back

Senior career*
Years	Team	Apps	(Gls)
1929–1930	Okehampton		
1930–1932	Torquay United	28	(1)
1932–1935	Grimsby Town	27	(0)
1935–1936	Sheffield Wednesday	3	(0)
1936–1937	Guildford City		
1937–1938	Swansea Town	4	(0)
1938–1939	Hartlepools United		
- * Club domestic league appearances and goals

James 'Jim' Wright (11 September 1910 – 1978) was an English professional footballer who played as a full-back.
