= Willie Hermiston =

Scottish cricketer and schoolteacher

Personal information
- Full name: William Hermiston
- Born: 4 February 1913; Makerstoun, Roxburghshire, Scotland
- Died: 17 January 1987 (aged 73); Edinburgh, Midlothian, Scotland
- Batting: Right-handed
- Bowling: Right-arm fast-medium

Domestic team information
- Years: Team
- 1949: Scotland

Career statistics
Competition	First-class
Matches	2
Runs scored	35
Batting average	8.75
100s/50s	–/–
Top score	21
Balls bowled	192
Wickets	2
Bowling average	42.00
5 wickets in innings	–
10 wickets in match	–
Best bowling	2/21
Catches/stumpings	1/–
- Source: Cricinfo, 9 July 2022

William 'Willie' Hermiston (4 February 1913 — 7 January 1987) was a Scottish first-class cricketer and civil servant.

Hermiston was born in February 1913 at Makerstoun and was educated at Leith Academy. A club cricketer for Leith Franklin Cricket Club, Hermiston made two appearances in first-class cricket for Scotland in 1949. The first came against the touring New Zealanders at Glasgow in 1949, while the second came against Ireland at Belfast. He scored 35 runs in his two matches from the lower middle order, with a highest score of 21. With his right-arm fast-medium bowling, he took 2 wickets which came in the match against Ireland. Outside of cricket, Hermiston worked as a local government officer. He died at Edinburgh in January 1987.
