= Ira C. Kepford =

American flying ace

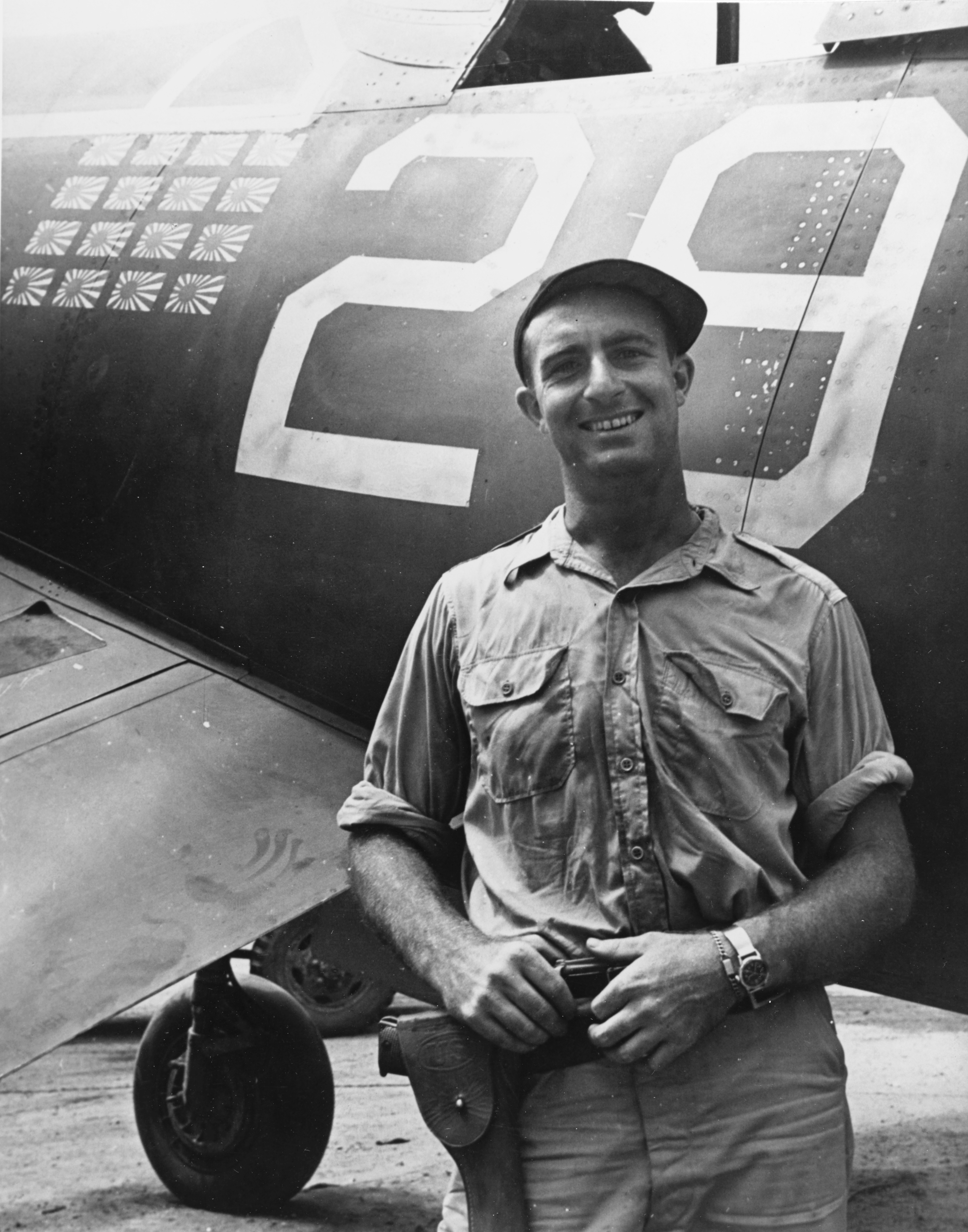
- Lt. (jg) Ira C. Kepford in front of his F4U Corsair
- Born: May 29, 1919; Harvey, Illinois, US
- Died: January 19, 1987 (aged 67); Harbor Springs, Michigan, US
- Burial place: Lakeside Cemetery; Muskegon, Michigan
- Military career
- Allegiance: United States
- Branch: United States Navy
- Service years: 1941–1956
- Rank: Lieutenant commander
- Nickname: "Ike"
- Unit: VF-17
- Conflicts: World War II: Bougainville Campaign
- Awards: Navy Cross (2); Silver Star; Distinguished Flying Cross; Air Medal

Ira Cassius Kepford (May 29, 1919 – January 19, 1987) was an American flying ace of World War II who served with a land-based unit of the United States Navy. In 76 days of combat flying with the VF-17 "Jolly Rogers," he was credited with shooting down 16 enemy aircraft. At the close of his combat service in April 1944, Kepford was the Navy's leading ace.

Kepford first made headlines in local papers as a promising high school football player. He went on to become a starting halfback for Northwestern University before signing up as a Navy reservist in anticipation of World War II. Kepford attained the rank of lieutenant commander before his discharge from the Navy and his entrance into the private sector. He worked his way up from trainee at a Liggett Drug Company store to President of the company, retiring in 1960. Kepford died in 1987, aged 67.

== Early life ==
Ira C. Kepford was born on May 29, 1919, in Harvey, Illinois. He grew up in Muskegon, Michigan, and attended Muskegon High School. In 1937 he was selected as an All-State athlete and as captain of the high school football team, which he led to an undefeated 9–0 season and state title victory.

"Ike" Kepford continued to play football at the collegiate level at Northwestern University, where he enrolled in the university's Dental School and picked up an interest in aeronautics. He served as one of two starting halfbacks on the Wildcats football team. Convinced that war was coming and that he would be drafted, Kepford enlisted in the United States Navy Reserve. He publicly "signed up" during the halftime ceremony of the season's final game on November 22, 1941.

== World War II ==
On April 29, 1942, Kepford was appointed aviation cadet, and by November 5, 1942, he earned his wings. His first operational assignment was to John Blackburn's VF-17 "Jolly Rogers" squadron. "Blackburn's Irregulars" earned a reputation as troublemakers at NAS Norfolk, where the men actively sought to sharpen their skills against servicemen in other branches of the military. Notably, Kepford engaged in a dogfight directly over the town of Norfolk with against a United States Army Air Forces (USAAF) pilot flying a P-51 Mustang. Tension brought about by such antics expedited the squadron's move to Manteo, where they completed training.

Unlike other carrier groups at the time, the Jolly Rogers were flying in the newly adopted Vought F4U Corsair. This led to problems with their scheduled deployment. Because other squadrons on Essex-class aircraft carriers were flying the Grumman F6F Hellcat, Navy planners feared parts would not be readily available for regular repair and maintenance of the squadron's aircraft. As a result, instead of serving with the rest of Air Group 17 aboard USS Bunker Hill, VF-17 was sent to the New Georgia where United States Marine Corps fighter pilots were already operating the Corsair.

=== 27 October – 1 December 1943 ===
Kepford and the other Jolly Rogers were first stationed at Ondonga, New Georgia. Their deployment coincided with the start of the Bougainville Campaign. The last few days in October were largely spent flying Dumbo escort and Combat air patrol (CAP) missions, the latter of which proved uneventful.

1 November 1943 inaugurated the Bougainville Campaign proper with the Battle of Empress Augusta Bay. VF-17 was tasked with flying CAP for the ships supporting this assault. The Japanese response to troop landings on Bougainville was swift and strong. Blackburn's two divisions (8 planes) intercepted around 40 enemy aircraft intent on destroying the invasion fleet. Kepford was assigned to the second 8-plane patrol. After two hours with no enemy contact, Kepford's 4-plane division broke off to strafe installations on Shortland Island before returning to Ondonga. Later that same day Kepford flew again with similar results: no enemy aircraft, divert to strafe Shortland.

Over the course of the next week VF-17 continued flying CAP for the task forces involved in the campaign, including Frederick C. Sherman's Task Force 38 (TF 38), whose carrier aircraft bombed Rabaul. Patrols were still negative. These lulls were punctuated by strike assignments to escort Navy and USAAF bombers attacking harbors and airstrips on Bougainville.

Kepford's first big day occurred on 11 November 1943 while VF-17 was providing CAP for Sherman's carriers. Blackburn's Corsairs patrolled the carrier task groups while they launched and recovered aircraft conducting strikes against Rabaul. A massed Japanese counterattack was launched in response, and upwards of 110 fighters and bombers were able to follow returning strike aircraft back to their carriers. Outnumbered approximately 3:1, the Jolly Rogers were able to shoot down 18 enemy aircraft and damage a half dozen more while suffering themselves 3 damaged planes, 1 injured pilot and no combat losses. Kepford shot down 3 Aichi D3A "Val" dive bombers and 1 Nakajima B5N "Kate" torpedo bomber.

The flight schedule for the remainder of November closely mirrors the first half of the month, consisting largely of CAP and strafing missions punctuated by escort duty for bombers striking Bougainville. One week after his first aerial victories, on 18 November, Kepford and his division discovered VF-17 pilot Lt. (jg) Anderson floating in a raft off Sandinsel Island. Anderson's plane had been badly damaged the previous day during an air battle over Empress Augusta Bay. He was picked up by a PT boat hours later.

VF-17's first combat tour was heralded in the press as a runaway success. For the period 1 – 29 November 1943, the squadron claimed 47 enemy aircraft downed with only 1 pilot lost. One news clipping, touting the squadron's two high-scorers, Kepford and Blackburn, referred to the "Skull and Crossbones" squadron as the "deadliest land-based Navy fighter outfit that ever operated in the South Pacific..."

=== 26 January – 7 March 1944 ===
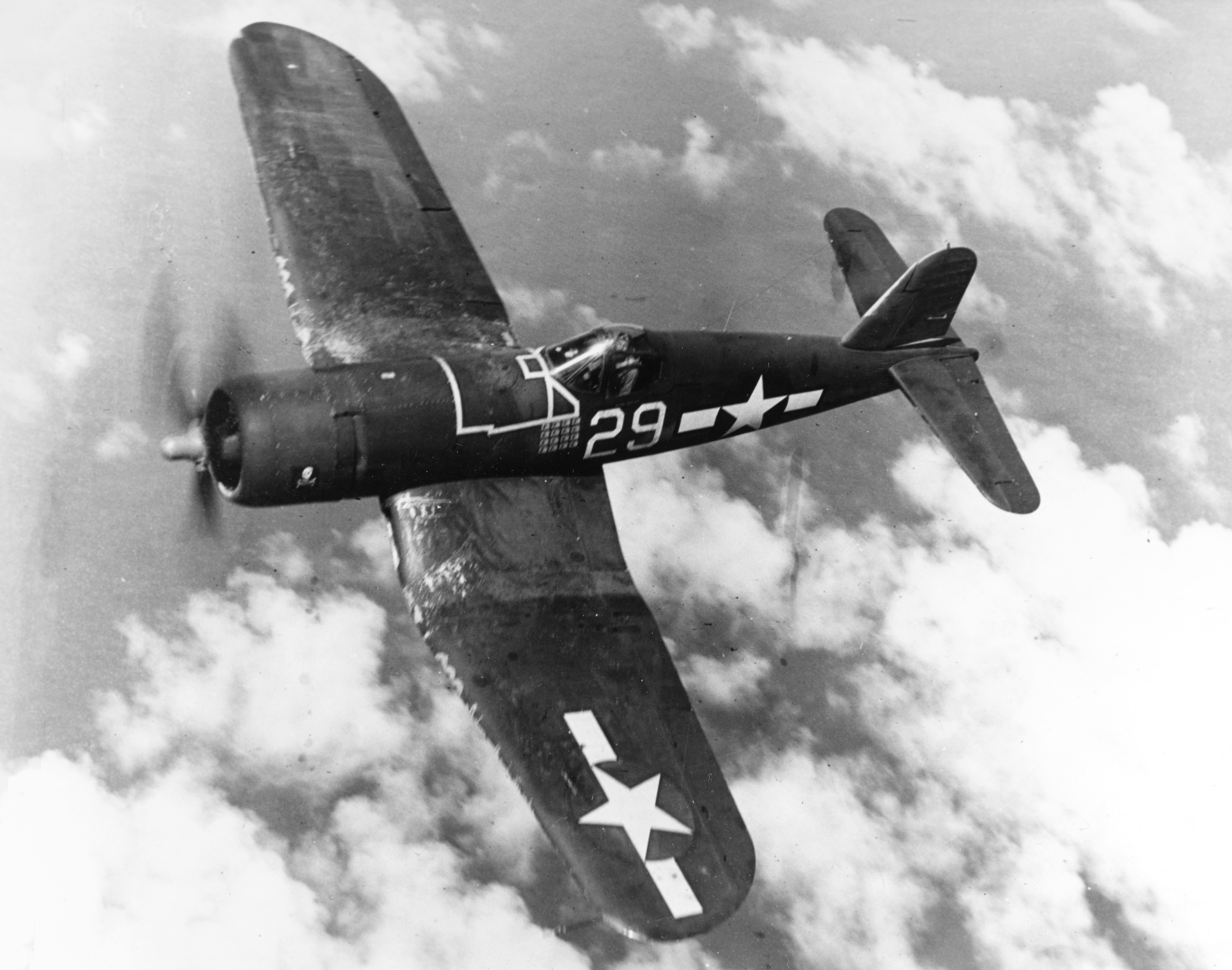
"Ike" Kepford's F4U-1A (BuNo 55995) over the Solomon Islands

The squadron's reformation and deployment coincided with the establishment of fighter airstrips inland of Cape Torokina on Bougainville. The Jolly Rogers operated from Piva Yoke airfield, continuing efforts by the USAAF and Navy to neutralize Rabaul. Almost from the outset of their deployment, VF-17 met stiff resistance from land-based Japanese aircraft operating out of Rabaul. According to Blackburn, this new tour "...was of an entirely different character than we had before. It was a hell of a sight more hazardous."

Between 26 and 27 January 1944, VF-17 flew escort for Navy SBD dive bomber and Avenger torpedo bomber planes attacking Lakunai airdrome. On each of these days the strike groups encountered around 60 enemy aircraft. In spite of this, no bombers were lost on either mission. Kepford flew on the second day and shot down two Mitsubishi A6M Zero aircraft, bringing his total to 6 aerial victories and flying ace status.

Strikes from 28 to 29 January were launched against Tobera Airfield in the Gazelle Peninsula of New Britain, southeast of Lakunai. Once again, despite more than 50 enemies intercepting the strike on 28 January and around 30 enemies encountered the next day, the squadron lost no bombers. Kepford flew "roving high cover" with his wingman Burriss, both climbing to 30,000′ while the bombers stayed at around 14,000′. The other two VF-17 pilots who were supposed to fly at high altitude suffered mechanical problems which caused them to abort. As a result, only Kepford and Burriss were in a position to see a group of Japanese Zeros at 24,000′ descending on the bomber formation. Kepford and Burriss intercepted and effectively "bounced" the enemies, leading to Kepford's second 4-victory day.

On 30 January, Kepford led one of four VF-17 divisions flying cover for dive and torpedo bombers striking Simpson Harbor, New Britain. Enemy fighters from Rabaul circled the harbor to intercept the bombers. The roving high cover division led by Blackburn was able to operate with the altitude advantage against enemies, but Kepford's division at 15,000′ was attacked from above by around a dozen enemy fighters, including at least one Tony. Kepford waited until a Japanese plane broke formation to make a gunnery run on a nearby Corsair. When the lone Zero turned to trail the American plane, Kepford followed and riddled the enemy's engine and wing root from behind, causing the plane to catch fire. Kepford was forced to peel off quickly thereafter due to the number of enemy planes around him. One of these, a Tony, came at him from the front. The plane's guns—of a larger caliber than those typically found on the Zero—tore into Kepford's right wing and caused the ammunition within to explode. During all of this, Kepford continued firing with the guns in his left wing, leaving the Tony flaming as it passed him by. Kepford hastened back to base with a wrecked wing and damaged hydraulic system, forcing him to land on one wheel and leading the plane to ground loop, causing its loss. Kepford walked away from the crash landing unhurt.

Aerial opposition to the B-24 strike escorted by VF-17 on 3 February was again numerically significant, though this time enemy fighters were reluctant to engage the bombers. More than 20 Zeros intercepted the formation and made a few passes on the bombers. On the second attempt by the Japanese formation, Kepford made a full deflection shot at the second Zero, which fell away on fire. After this loss, enemy planes made no further attempts to disrupt bomber operations.

Kepford's next big day arrived on 19 February. VF-17 was assigned fighter escort duty, shepherding single engine bombers to strikes on Lakunai Airfield. Kepford was again assigned as division leader, this time for one of two groups flying high cover. His wingman had engine problems and was quickly forced to return to Piva. Arriving at the target site, Kepford decided there was enough fighter cover and that he was too vulnerable without a wingman, so he too headed back for home base. En route, he spotted a Rufe float plane flying low on the water, which he easily shot down. Immediately after, a mass of 20 or so enemy fighters spotted Kepford flying alone beneath them and dove on the vulnerable pilot. He was quickly penned in by four enemy aircraft and forced to head north, away from his base. He used his plane's water injection—a new feature installed on a small number of Corsairs—to help him pull as far ahead of the enemies as possible, but the device worked fitfully. He tried to lose them flying low over land, without success. Deciding he was moving too far afield to return to base on remaining fuel reserves, Kepford quickly cut to the left and reversed direction south over the water. The plane following Kepford on the left side attempted to turn inside to shoot him down, but the pilot misjudged his altitude and struck his wing into the water below, crashing. Those on the right side lost too much ground when Kepford reversed, so they gave up the chase.

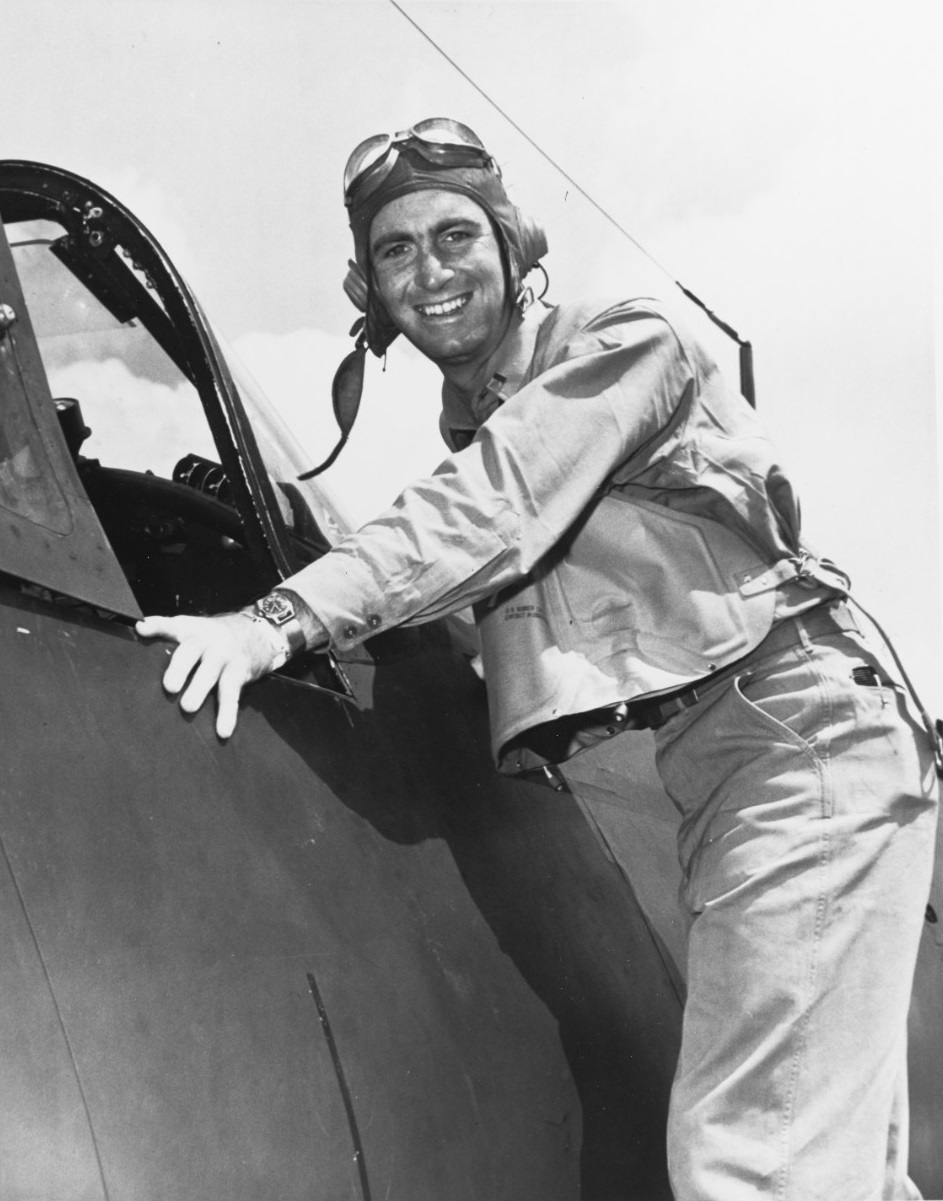
Kepford poses by the cockpit of an F4U after his second combat tour.

From 19 February to 8 March, when the squadron departed Piva, no significant fighter interception was encountered. The squadron was decommissioned 10 April 1944.

=== After VF-17 ===
At the end of his two tours, Kepford was the Navy's ranking ace with 16 credited victories. VF-17 returned to the United States as the highest scoring squadron to date, credited with 154 enemy planes definitely destroyed in 79 days of combat. News of the squadron's success spread quickly. Newspapers celebrated Kepford's achievement and the Freedom of Opportunity program aired a dramatization of Kepford's life on coast-to-coast radio. In June 1944, Kepford spoke at a war rally in Illinois while his squadron commander, Blackburn, flew above the audience.

VF-84 carried the lineage forward. Kepford joined a number of VF-17 alumni in the newly formed squadron and stayed on from summer through early December 1944 while the men trained in the use of rockets, completed carrier qualifications, etc. Kepford was detached and given a post at Naval Air Station San Diego as a carrier air group fighter instructor. He was selected to assist in the inspection of the newly commissioned USS Boxer, evaluating the performance of the ship's air group.

== Post-war ==
Kepford and his wife Kraeg had a son and daughter, and several grandchildren.

Kepford remained in the US Naval Reserve until 1956, when he retired from the service. Upon retirement he was promoted to lieutenant commander on the strength of his combat citations. Kepford worked for more than 10 years at the Liggett-Rexall company, where he climbed from store associate to Vice President of Marketing and finally, in 1960, to President of Liggett Drug Co. He retired the same year. After dabbling in investments for a time, in 1978 he moved to Harbor Springs, Michigan, where he lived until his death in 1987. He was 67 years old.

He is buried at Lakeside Cemetery in Muskegon, Michigan.

== Awards and decorations ==

Naval Aviator insignia
Navy Cross w/ 5/16" gold star
Silver Star	Distinguished Flying Cross	Air Medal
Navy Unit Commendation	American Defense Service Medal	American Campaign Medal
Asiatic-Pacific Campaign Medal w/ three 3/16" bronze stars	World War II Victory Medal	Naval Reserve Medal

=== 1st Navy Cross citation ===

Lieutenant Ira Cassius Kepford
U.S. Navy
Date Of Action: November 11, 1943

The President of the United States of America takes pleasure in presenting the Navy Cross to Lieutenant [then Ensign] Ira Cassius Kepford, United States Naval Reserve, for extraordinary heroism in operations against the enemy while serving as Pilot of a carrier-based Navy Fighter Plane in Fighting Squadron Seventeen (VF-17), embarked in the USS Hornet (CV-12), in action against enemy Japanese forces in the vicinity of the Solomon Islands, on 11 November 1943. While covering United States Task Force Fifty Point Three (TF-50.3) in Empress Augusta Bay, Kepford participated in an engagement involving approximately one hundred Japanese aircraft. Gallantly pressing home his attacks through intense anti-aircraft fire, he destroyed four enemy bombers and damaged another out of a formation of thirty. His courage and airmanship reflect the highest credit upon Lieutenant Kepford and the United States Naval Service.

=== 2nd Navy Cross citation ===

Lieutenant Ira Cassius Kepford
U.S. Navy
Date Of Action: January 29, 1944

The President of the United States of America takes pleasure in presenting a Gold Star in lieu of a Second Award of the Navy Cross to Lieutenant [then Ensign] Ira Cassius Kepford, United States Naval Reserve, for extraordinary heroism in operations against the enemy while serving as Pilot of a carrier-based Navy Fighter Plane in Fighting Squadron Seventeen (VF-17), embarked in the USS Hornet (CV-12), in action against enemy Japanese forces in the Solomon Islands Area, on 29 January 1944. Intercepted by a numerically superior force of Japanese planes while flying escort for a bomber strike over Tobara airfield, Lieutenant Kepford and a companion engaged twelve enemy planes and, pressing home his repeated attacks, personally shot down four of the hostile aircraft. By his expert airmanship and courage in the face of tremendous odds, Lieutenant Kepford contributed materially to the success of the mission and upheld the highest traditions of the United States Naval Service.
