= Zsófia Dénes =

Hungarian writer

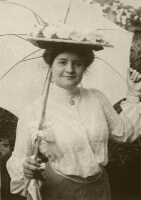
- Born: 14 January 1885; Budapest, Hungary
- Died: 22 January 1987 (aged 102); Budapest, Hungary

Zsófia Józsefné Szalatnyay Dénes (14 January 1885 – 22 January 1987) was a Hungarian writer.

== Biography ==
She was born in Budapest. During the 1910s, Dénes was Paris correspondent for the Hungarian magazines Pesti Napló and Világ; she reported on the premieres of ballets composed by Igor Stravinsky and performed by Vaslav Nijinsky. She moved to Vienna in 1919 after the fall of the Hungarian Soviet Republic. Dénes worked for a Hungarian language newspaper there until 1925. She then returned to Budapest, where she worked as a journalist and also lobbied for women's rights and for pacifism.

She was briefly engaged to the Hungarian poet Endre Ady and published a memoir on his life Élet helyett órák (Hours instead of life) in 1935. In 1957, she published Akkor a hársak épp szerettek (At that time the linden trees were loving) which also dealt with their relationship. In 1976, she established the Ady Prize in his honour.

Dénes wrote the first Hungarian biography of Vladimir Lenin. She knew prominent figures of her time such as Sigmund Freud and poet Rainer Maria Rilke.

In 1985, she published Ami a százból kimaradt (What has been left out from a hundred). At the time, she was considered the oldest author in Hungary.

She died in Budapest at the age of 102.

== Selected works ==
- Zrínyi Ilona, historical novel (1959)
- Gyalog a baloldalon (Pedestrian on the left bank) (1965)
- Párizsi körhinta (Paris merry-go-round), memoirs (1966)
- Szivárvány (Rainbow), memoirs (1970)
