= James Wright (Jamaican politician) =

James Wright CBE (11 October 1904 – 1984/85) was the Director of Agriculture for Jamaica and a member of the Legislative Council of Jamaica.

Wright was born 11 October 1904 in England to parents George and Beatrice Maude (née Poole). He married Margaret Helen Anderson on 5 August 1931 at Parish Church, Anstruther Easter, Fife, Scotland. They had three sons.

In 1946 he was employed as a Senior Agricultural Officer in Jamaica and between 1946 and 1948 was the officer in charge of the Orange River Agricultural Station. In 1949 he was appointed as the Deputy-Director of Agriculture (Research) and in 1951 the Assistant Director of Agriculture in Nigeria. In June 1951 he was appointed the Director of Agriculture in Jamaica a position he remained in until circa 1962. On 1 January 1955, as part of the New Years Honours List, he was appointed as a Commander of the Order of the British Empire. On 25 January 1955, he was appointed as a member of the Legislative Council of Jamaica, replacing Lawrence Fitzmaurice.

Wright and his wife emigrated to New Zealand circa 1965. Margaret died on 22 April 1967. Wright remarried Rita (née Anderson) circa 1969, who died circa 1974. He married a third time to May (née Keily) circa 1976.

He died in late 1984/early 1985 in Tauranga, Bay Of Plenty, New Zealand. He was survived by May and his three sons from his first marriage. Wright was buried on 2 January 1985 at Otorohanga Cemetery, Waikato, New Zealand.
