= Mario Sánchez (footballer) =

Mexican footballer (1926-1987)

Personal information
- Full name: Mario Gilberto Sánchez Huerta
- Date of birth: 24 June 1926
- Date of death: 24 January 1987 (aged 60)

International career
Years	Team	Apps	(Gls)
1948	Mexico	1	(0)

Mario Gilberto Sánchez Huerta (24 June 1926 – 24 January 1987) was a Mexican footballer. He competed in the men's tournament at the 1948 Summer Olympics.
