= Hermann Voss (anatomist) =

German anatomist

Christian Heinrich Emil Hermann Voss (October 13, 1894 – January 19, 1987) was a German anatomist. Well known as a medical academic and textbook author he was also notorious for his experiments during the Third Reich.

== Early life ==
The son of a manor lessee, Voss was born in Berlin but raised in Warnkenhagen and Malchin. He studied variously at the Ludwig-Maximilians-Universität München (LMU), Heidelberg University and the University of Rostock before completing his doctorate in 1919, including a spell away from study in the army during the First World War as an army doctor.

Voss became assistant anatomist at his Rostock alma mater in May 1919. In 1926 he transferred to the University of Leipzig but here found career advancement difficult to come by. Voss joined the Nazi Party in 1937, initially only to help advance his career which he felt was being held back by his lack of involvement in the party. The following year Voss was appointed chief anatomist and associate professor at Leipzig.

== Under the Nazis ==
Following the establishment of the Reich University of Posen Voss served as director of the anatomy institute. Under Voss experiments on both Jews and Poles became commonplace and indeed Voss became notorious for his anti-Polish sentiment, writing in his diaries that "the Polish people must be eradicated". By this time Voss had become a convinced follower of the Nazi Weltanschauung, with his diaries revealing a strong current of anti-Semitism and anti-communism.

Whilst in this role he made a deal with the local Gestapo allowing them to use his incinerators in return for the use of some of the bodies of those executed by hanging or decapitation. Voss also had a sideline selling the skulls and death masks of Jews and Poles, with the Naturhistorisches Museum's curator Josef Wastl being his leading customer for this particular service. Along with colleagues such as Robert Herrlinger Voss undertook preparation work for this trade as soon as the victims had been killed.

== Post-war ==
Following the war Voss settled in East Germany and was a professor at the University of Jena from 1952 to 1962 and later as a professor emeritus at Greifswald Medical School. His anatomy textbook, popularly known as "Voss und Herrlinger" was published simultaneously in Jena and Stuttgart for almost forty years and seventeen editions and became a standard reference for German medical students, with editions also appearing in Spanish and Polish. He also edited the world-renowned journal Anatomischer Anzeiger from 1952 to 1974 and from 1954 to 1980 was director of the equally prestigious Acta Histochemica, the leading journal on delicate tissue studies.

He would subsequently move to West Germany in retirement and died in Hamburg in 1987 at the age of 92.

== Personal life ==
Voss was married to Eva, who was four years older than him, in 1919. They had one son Hermann junior in November 1919, who demonstrated highly advanced intelligence from an early age but who also suffered from severe physical disabilities. He died of suffocation in 1939. A daughter, Sabine, followed in 1933.

== See also ==
- Nazi human experimentation
