= Gerald C. MacCallum Jr. =

American philosopher

Gerald C. MacCallum Jr. (June 16, 1925 – January 14, 1987) was an American philosopher. He was Professor of Philosophy at the University of Wisconsin–Madison. MacCallum is well known for his critique to the distinction, made famous by Isaiah Berlin, between negative and positive liberty, proposing instead that the concept of freedom can only be understood as a 'triadic relation', in which "x is (is not) free from y to do (not do, become, not become) z". His other publications include Political Philosophy (Englewood Cliffs: Prentice-Hall, 1987) and Legislative Intent and Other Essays on Law, Politics, and Morality (University of Wisconsin Press, 1993, edited by Marcus G. Singer and Rex Martin) which collects 14 essays on topics that include legislative intent, violence, integrity, civil disobedience, and conscience, as well as negative and positive freedom.
