= Tony Sansone =

Italian-American bodybuilder and model (died 1987)

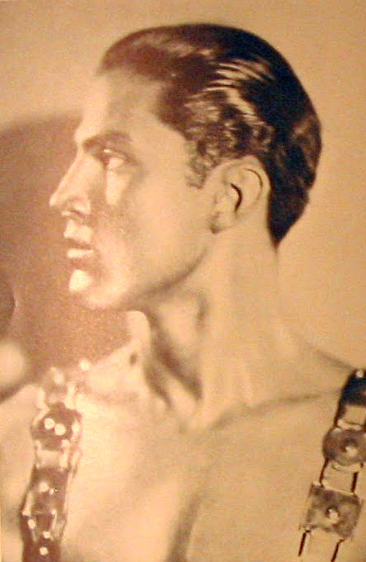
Tony Sansone

Tony Sansone (died January 13, 1987) was an Italian-American bodybuilder and model.

== Background ==
Anthony Joseph Sansone's parents were both Sicilian immigrants: Ignazio (Charles) Sansone and Paolina (Pauline) Giardina. Sansone married Sophie Frank ("Rita") in 1926, and had two children, Pauline and Anthony Joseph, Jr ("Nino").

== Early interest in physique development ==
At an early age, Sansone (pronounced sahn-sown-eh, later Americanized to san-sown-ee) had contracted scarlet fever and then typhoid fever, leaving him with a fragile build. At 14, he took an interest in sports and began working out at a nearby park, doing running, chin-ups, handstands, and other acrobatics. At 16, he came across magazine pictures of physique star Tommy Farber in Physical Culture magazine and became interested in physical development. He trained under the tutelage of bodybuilding publisher Bernarr Macfadden and bodybuilder Charles Atlas (aka Angelo Siciliano).

In October 1923, Sansone, 18, won a physique contest sponsored by Atlas. He did not pursue competitive bodybuilding as a career, however and never earned any titles.

== Modeling ==
Much of Tony Sansone's enduring fame in bodybuilding history was the result of his success as a model.

Sansone began modeling when he was still a teenager. During the Depression, Sansone profited by selling pictures of himself through mail-order ads. He became a much sought-after model who posed for paintings, photographs, and sculpture. He was featured on many magazine covers, both American and European. He modeled for statues by James Earle Fraser ("Meriwether Lewis;" Fraser also designed the US buffalo nickel), Arthur Lee ("Rhythm" which was created over five years, 1925–1930), and Malvina Hoffman ("Nordic Type" and "Elemental Man").

Sansone published several photo books, including Modern Classics, Rhythm, Du-ets (sic), and Nudleafs. By 1936, he had sold over 15,000 copies of Modern Classics and Rhythm combined.

== Theater, film, businessman ==
In the mid-1920s, Sansone began studying dance as an exercise. He was selected by Alexandre Gavrilov to perform in "Ballet Moderne" which debuted on April 10, 1928. He also toured with Polish-Yugoslavian ballet dancer Desha Podgorska. His dance career was cut short by a knee accident, but the training influenced his style of posing.

From 1928 to 1929, Sansone performed in David Belasco's elaborate sci-fi theater production of Mima. The show ran for 180 performances.

Among the spectators of "Mima" was photographer Edwin F. Townsend. Townsend took a great interest in Sansone and began photographing him in 1929. He became Sansone's principal photographer.

In 1929, Sansone got a small part in director John W. Harkrider's Glorifying the American Girl, which co-starred Eddie Cantor. Like competitive bodybuilding, Sansone never pursued acting as a career.

Sansone owned and operated three gyms (which he referred to as "body culture studios") in New York City. Bodybuilder Steve Reeves was among his customers.

== Physique ==
Tony Sansone stood 6 feet tall and weighed 185 lbs. His muscles were highly defined but did not display the massive bulkiness common in modern bodybuilding. Sansone, in fact, took no interest in measurements, preferring a look that was more slender and flexible. His training included weightlifting, running, swimming, and gymnastics. Sansone was especially strong in parallel bar work.

Sansone was photographed mainly in the nude, and was celebrated for his creative posing. Although naturally tan, Sansone enhanced his "bronze" look with body makeup. Charles Atlas called him "The Most Beautiful Man in America." Physical-culture historian David Gentle said "If Sansone had been born in Greek antiquity, he would have been immortalized as a god."

== Later life ==
Tony Sansone retired from the gym business after 30 years. He went on to do volunteer work, especially teaching underprivileged children.

Sansone died on January 13, 1987, after a five-year struggle with colon cancer.

== Sources ==
- Massey, John (2004). American Adonis: Tony Sansone, the First Male Physique Icon. Universe. ISBN 978-0-7893-1072-9.
